= 7th Parliament of Singapore =

Singaporean parliamentary meeting

←	6th	8th	→
Composition as of 22 November 1990
Government:
PAP (80)
Opposition:
WP (2)
SDP (1)
NMP (2)

Overview
- Legislative body: Parliament of Singapore
- Meeting place: Old Parliament House
- Term: 9 January 1989 – 14 August 1991 (2 years, 7 months and 5 days)
- Election: 3 September 1988
- Government: People's Action Party
- Opposition: Workers' Party; Singapore Democratic Party

Parliament of Singapore
- Members: 81 + 2 NCMPs + 2 NMPs
- Speaker: Tan Soo Khoon
- Leader of the House: Wong Kan Seng
- Prime Minister: Lee Kuan Yew (until 28 November 1990); Goh Chok Tong (from 28 November 1990)
- Leader of the Opposition: Chiam See Tong
- Party control: PAP supermajority

Sessions
- 1st: 9 January 1989 – 21 April 1990 (1 year, 3 months and 12 days)
- 2nd: 7 June 1990 – 29 January 1991 (7 months and 22 days)
- 3rd: 22 February 1991 – 14 August 1991 (5 months and 23 days)

The 7th Parliament of Singapore was a meeting of the Parliament of Singapore. Its first session commenced on 9 January 1989 and was prorogued on 21 April 1990. Its second session commenced on 7 June 1990 and was prorogued on 29 January 1991. It commenced its third session on 22 February 1991 and was dissolved on 14 August 1991.

The members of the Seventh Parliament were elected in the 1988 general election. Parliament was controlled by a People's Action Party majority, who were led by Prime Minister Lee Kuan Yew and his Cabinet until 28 November 1990, when Goh Chok Tong and his Cabinet assumed power. Tan Soo Khoon served as Speaker. The de facto Leader of the Opposition was Chiam See Tong of the Singapore Democratic Party.

The Seventh Parliament saw the introduction of the Nominated Members of Parliament (NMP) scheme, which allowed for the appointment of non-partisan members of certain functional groups to Parliament. Cardiologist Maurice Choo and Chairman of the Singapore Tourist Promotion Board Leong Chee Whye were appointed as NMPs on 22 November 1990.

Shortly after assuming the role of Prime Minister, Goh Chok Tong would call a snap election on 14 August 1991, in order to court a fresh mandate. With a tenure of two years and seven months, the Seventh Parliament was the shortest in Singapore's history, as well as being the only one as of 2026 to have three sessions.

== Results of the 1988 general election ==
Party	Votes	%	Seats	+/–
People's Action Party	848,029	63.17	80	▲3
Workers' Party	224,473	16.72	2	▲1
Singapore Democratic Party	158,341	11.80	1	Steady
National Solidarity Party	50,432	3.76	0	New
United People's Front	17,282	1.29	0	Steady
Singapore Justice Party	14,660	1.09	0	Steady
Singapore Malay National Organisation	13,526	1.01	0	Steady
Angkatan Islam Singapura	280	0.02	0	Steady
Independents	15,412	1.15	0	Steady
Total	1,342,435	100.00	83	▲4
Valid votes	1,342,435	97.77		
Invalid/blank votes	30,629	2.23		
Total votes	1,373,064	100.00		
Registered voters/turnout	1,669,013	94.70		
Source: Singapore Elections

== Officeholders ==
- Speaker: Tan Soo Khoon (Brickworks GRC, PAP)
- Deputy Speaker:
  - Lim Boon Heng (Kebun Baru SMC, PAP), from 16 January 1989
  - Abdullah Tarmugi (Siglap SMC, PAP), from 16 January 1989
- Prime Minister:
  - Lee Kuan Yew (Tanjong Pagar SMC, PAP), until 28 November 1990
  - Goh Chok Tong (Marine Parade GRC, PAP), from 28 November 1990
- Deputy Prime Minister of Singapore:
  - Goh Chok Tong (Marine Parade GRC, PAP), until 28 November 1990
  - Ong Teng Cheong (Kim Keat SMC, PAP)
  - Lee Hsien Loong (Teck Ghee SMC, PAP), from 28 November 1990
- Leader of the Opposition: Chiam See Tong (Potong Pasir SMC, SDP)
- Leader of the House: Wong Kan Seng (Toa Payoh GRC, PAP)
- Government Party Whip: Lee Boon Yang (Jalan Besar GRC, PAP)
- Deputy Government Party Whip: Ho Kah Leong (Jurong SMC, PAP)

== Composition ==
Party	Members	
Party	At election	At dissolution
People's Action Party	80	80
Workers' Party	2 NCMPs	1 NCMP
Singapore Democratic Party	1	1
Nominated Members of Parliament	0	2
Vacant seats	0	1
Total	83	85
Government majority	79	79

== Members ==
Constituency	Division	Member	Party
Aljunied GRC	Aljunied	Chin Harn Tong 钱翰琮	PAP
Aljunied GRC	Kampong Kembangan	Wan Hussin Zoohri وان حسين زوهري	PAP
Aljunied GRC	Kampong Ubi	George Yeo 杨荣文	PAP
Ang Mo Kio SMC		Yeo Toon Chia 杨敦清	PAP
Ayer Rajah SMC		Tan Cheng Bock 陈清木	PAP
Bedok GRC	Bedok	S. Jayakumar எஸ். செயக்குமார்	PAP
Bedok GRC	Kampong Chai Chee	Ibrahim Othman إبراهيم عثمان	PAP
Bedok GRC	Tanah Merah	Hong Hai 黄海	PAP
Boon Lay SMC		Goh Chee Wee 吴志伟	PAP
Braddell Heights SMC		Goh Choon Kang 吴俊刚	PAP
Brickworks GRC	Alexandra	Tan Soo Khoon 陈树群	PAP
Brickworks GRC	Brickworks	Ahmad Mattar أحمد مطر	PAP
Brickworks GRC	Queenstown	Chay Wai Chuen 谢惠泉	PAP
Bukit Batok SMC		Ong Chit Chung 翁执中	PAP
Bukit Gombak SMC		Seet Ai Mee 薛爱美	PAP
Bukit Merah SMC		Lim Chee Onn 林子安	PAP
Bukit Panjang SMC		Lee Yiok Seng 李玉胜	PAP
Bukit Timah SMC		Wang Kai Yuen 王家园	PAP
Buona Vista SMC		Peter Sung 宋彼得	PAP
Cairnhill SMC		Wong Kwei Cheong 黄贵祥	PAP
Changi SMC		Teo Chong Tee 张宗治	PAP
Cheng San GRC	Cheng San	Lee Yock Suan 李玉全	PAP
Cheng San GRC	Chong Boon	S. Chandra Das எஸ். சந்திர தாஸ்	PAP
Cheng San GRC	Jalan Kayu	Heng Chiang Meng 王章明	PAP
Chua Chu Kang SMC		Low Seow Chay 刘绍济	PAP
Eunos GRC	Eunos	Zulkifli Mohammed ذوالکيفلي محمد	PAP
Eunos GRC	Kaki Bukit	Chew Heng Ching 周亨增	PAP
Eunos GRC	Tampines North	Tay Eng Soon 郑永顺	PAP
Fengshan SMC		Arthur Beng 孟建南	PAP
Hong Kah GRC	Hong Kah Central	Abdul Nasser Kamaruddin عبد الناصر قمرالدين	PAP
Hong Kah GRC	Hong Kah North	John Chen 陈晓朋	PAP
Hong Kah GRC	Hong Kah South	Yeo Cheow Tong 姚照东	PAP
Hougang SMC		Tang Guan Seng 陈原生	PAP
Jalan Besar GRC	Geylang West	Peh Chin Hua 白振华	PAP
Jalan Besar GRC	Jalan Besar	Lee Boon Yang 李文献	PAP
Jalan Besar GRC	Kolam Ayer	Sidek Saniff صديق صانف	PAP
Jurong SMC		Ho Kah Leong 何家良	PAP
Kallang SMC		S. Dhanabalan எஸ். தநபாலன்	PAP
Kampong Glam SMC		Loh Meng See 罗明士	PAP
Kebun Baru SMC		Lim Boon Heng 林文兴	PAP
Kim Keat SMC		Ong Teng Cheong 王鼎昌	PAP
Kim Seng SMC		Yeo Ning Hong 杨林丰	PAP
Kreta Ayer SMC		Richard Hu 胡赐道	PAP
Leng Kee SMC		Ow Chin Hock 欧进福	PAP
MacPherson SMC		Chua Sian Chin 蔡善进	PAP
Marine Parade GRC	Geylang Serai	Choo Wee Khiang 朱为强	PAP
Marine Parade GRC	Joo Chiat	Othman Haron Eusofe عثمان هارون يوسف	PAP
Marine Parade GRC	Marine Parade	Goh Chok Tong 吴作栋	PAP
Moulmein SMC		Lawrence Sia 谢坤祥	PAP
Mountbatten SMC		Eugene Yap 叶尧清	PAP
Nee Soon Central SMC		Ng Pock Too 吴博韬	PAP
Nee Soon South SMC		Koh Lip Lin 高立人	PAP
Pasir Panjang GRC	Clementi	Bernard Chen 陈天立	PAP
Pasir Panjang GRC	Pasir Panjang	Abbas Abu Amin عباس أبو أمين	PAP
Pasir Panjang GRC	West Coast	Wan Soon Bee 阮顺美	PAP
Paya Lebar SMC		Philip Tan 陈治洋	PAP
Potong Pasir SMC		Chiam See Tong 詹时中	SDP
Punggol SMC		Ng Kah Ting 黄嘉腾	PAP
Sembawang GRC	Chong Pang	Tony Tan 陈庆炎	PAP
Sembawang GRC	Nee Soon East	Charles Chong 张有福	PAP
Sembawang GRC	Sembawang	K. Shanmugam கா. சண்முகம்	PAP
Serangoon Gardens SMC		Lau Teik Soon 刘德顺	PAP
Siglap SMC		Abdullah Tarmugi عبد الله تارموعي	PAP
Tampines GRC	Tampines Changkat	Aline Wong 黄简丽中	PAP
Tampines GRC	Tampines East	Mah Bow Tan 马宝山	PAP
Tampines GRC	Tampines West	Yatiman Yusof ياتيمان يوسف	PAP
Tanglin SMC		Lew Syn Pau 刘信保	PAP
Tanjong Pagar SMC		Lee Kuan Yew 李光耀	PAP
Teck Ghee SMC		Lee Hsien Loong 李显龙	PAP
Telok Blangah SMC		Koh Lam Son 许南山	PAP
Thomson SMC		Leong Horn Kee 梁汉基	PAP
Tiong Bahru GRC	Henderson	S. Vasoo எஸ். வாசு	PAP
Tiong Bahru GRC	Radin Mas	Chng Hee Kok 庄熙国	PAP
Tiong Bahru GRC	Tiong Bahru	Ch'ng Jit Koon 庄日昆	PAP
Toa Payoh GRC	Boon Teck	Ho Tat Kin 何达坚	PAP
Toa Payoh GRC	Kuo Chuan	Wong Kan Seng 黄根成	PAP
Toa Payoh GRC	Toa Payoh	Davinder Singh ਦਵਿੰਦਰ ਸਿੰਘ	PAP
Ulu Pandan SMC		Dixie Tan 陈李慕真	PAP
Whampoa SMC		Augustine Tan 陈惠兴	PAP
Yio Chu Kang SMC		Lau Ping Sum 刘炳森	PAP
Yuhua SMC		Yu-Foo Yee Shoon 于符喜泉	PAP
Non-constituency Members of Parliament		Lee Siew Choh 李绍祖	WP
Non-constituency Members of Parliament		Francis Seow (Note: Francis Seow fled to the United States soon after the 1988 elections and did not take up his seat. He was removed from Parliament on 17 December 1988 after being convicted of tax evasion in absentia.) 萧添寿	WP
Nominated Members of Parliament		Maurice Choo (from 1990) 朱福兴	NMP
Nominated Members of Parliament		Leong Chee Whye (from 1990) 梁志玮	NMP
