= First Goh Chok Tong Cabinet =

- 9th Cabinet of Singapore

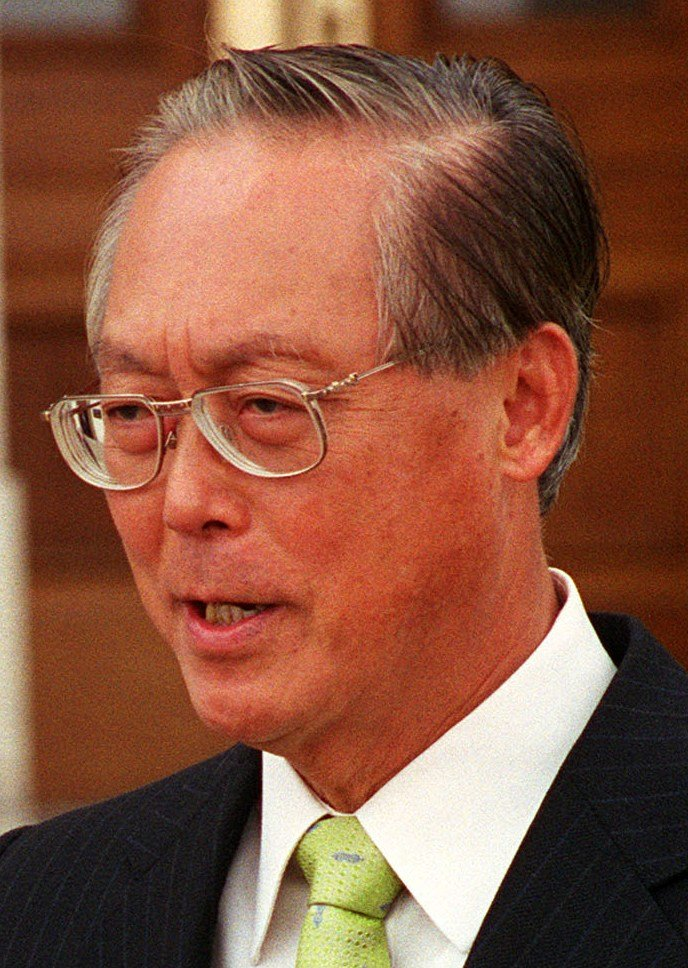
- Date formed: 28 November 1990
- Date dissolved: 6 September 1991

People and organisations
- Head of state: Wee Kim Wee
- Head of government: Goh Chok Tong
- Deputy head of government: Lee Hsien Loong; Ong Teng Cheong
- Member party: People's Action Party
- Status in legislature: Supermajority
- Opposition party: Worker's Party; Singapore Democratic Party
- Opposition leader: Chiam See Tong

History
- Legislature term: 7th Parliament of Singapore
- Predecessor: Eighth Lee Kuan Yew Cabinet
- Successor: Second Goh Chok Tong Cabinet

The first Goh Chok Tong Cabinet was formed after Prime Minister Goh Chok Tong was sworn in after the previous Prime Minister, Lee Kuan Yew, stepped down and handed over prime ministership to Goh on 28 November 1990.

== Cabinet ==
The First Goh Chok Tong Cabinet was composed of the following members.

Portfolio	Name	Term
Prime Minister	Goh Chok Tong	28 November 1990 – 12 August 2004
Senior Minister	Lee Kuan Yew	28 November 1990 – 21 May 2011
Deputy Prime Minister	Ong Teng Cheong	28 November 1990 – 16 August 1993
Deputy Prime Minister	Lee Hsien Loong	28 November 1990 – 12 August 2004
Minister in the Prime Minister's Office	Lee Boon Yang	1 July 1991 – 1 January 1992
Minister for Defence	Goh Chok Tong	1 June 1982 – 30 June 1991
Minister for Defence	Yeo Ning Hong	1 July 1991 – 1 July 1994
Second Minister for Defence	Yeo Ning Hong	28 November 1990 – 30 June 1991
Second Minister for Defence	Lee Boon Yang	1 July 1991 – 1 July 1994
Minister for Trade and Industry	Lee Hsien Loong	1 January 1987 – 6 December 1992
Minister for National Development	S. Dhanabalan	1 January 1987 – 31 August 1992
Minister for Education	Tony Tan	2 January 1985 – 1 January 1992
Minister for the Environment	Ahmad Mattar	2 January 1985 – 30 June 1993
Minister-in-charge of Muslim Affairs	Ahmad Mattar	5 September 1977 – 30 June 1993
Minister for Communications	Yeo Ning Hong	28 November 1990 – 30 June 1991
Minister for Communications	Mah Bow Tan	1 July 1991 – 6 September 1991 (acting)
Minister for Law	S. Jayakumar	13 September 1988 – 30 April 2008
Minister for Home Affairs	S. Jayakumar	2 January 1985 – 1 January 1994
Minister for Finance	Richard Hu	7 May 1985 – 9 November 2001
Minister for Labour	Lee Yock Suan	1 January 1987 – 1 January 1992
Minister for Foreign Affairs	Wong Kan Seng	13 September 1988 – 1 January 1994
Second Minister for Foreign Affairs	George Yeo	1 July 1991 – 1 January 1994
Minister for Community Development	Wong Kan Seng	1 January 1987 – 30 June 1991
Minister for Community Development	Seet Ai Mee	1 July 1991 – 6 September 1991 (acting)
Minister for Health	Yeo Cheow Tong	28 November 1990 – 1 January 1994
Minister for Information and the Arts	George Yeo	28 November 1990 – 30 June 1991 (acting), 1 July 1991 – 2 June 1999

== List of office holders ==
The following is the list of office holders in the First Goh Chok Tong Cabinet. Cabinet members are listed in bold.

Prime Minister's Office
Office	Name	Term start	Term end
Prime Minister	**Goh Chok Tong**	28 November 1990	6 September 1991
Senior Minister	**Lee Kuan Yew**	28 November 1990	6 September 1991
Deputy Prime Minister	**Ong Teng Cheong**	28 November 1990	6 September 1991
Deputy Prime Minister	**Lee Hsien Loong**	28 November 1990	6 September 1991
Minister in the Prime Minister's Office	**Lee Boon Yang**	1 July 1991	6 September 1991
Ministry of Communications
Office	Name	Term start	Term end
Minister for Communications	**Yeo Ning Hong**	28 November 1990	30 June 1991
Minister for Communications	**Mah Bow Tan** (Note: In an acting capacity.)	1 July 1991	6 September 1991
Minister of State for Communications	Mah Bow Tan	28 November 1990	30 June 1991
Ministry of Community Development
Office	Name	Term start	Term end
Minister for Community Development	**Wong Kan Seng**	28 November 1990	30 June 1991
Minister for Community Development	**Seet Ai Mee**	1 July 1991	6 September 1991
Minister of State for Community Development	Ch'ng Jit Koon	28 November 1990	6 September 1991
Minister of State for Community Development	Seet Ai Mee	28 November 1990	30 June 1991
Ministry of Defence
Office	Name	Term start	Term end
Minister for Defence	**Goh Chok Tong**	28 November 1990	30 June 1991
Minister for Defence	**Yeo Ning Hong**	1 July 1991	6 September 1991
Second Minister for Defence	**Yeo Ning Hong**	28 November 1990	30 June 1991
Second Minister for Defence	**Lee Boon Yang**	1 July 1991	6 September 1991
Senior Minister of State for Defence	Lee Boon Yang	28 November 1990	30 June 1991
Ministry of Education
Office	Name	Term start	Term end
Minister for Education	**Tony Tan**	28 November 1990	6 September 1991
Senior Minister of State for Education	Tay Eng Soon	28 November 1990	6 September 1991
Minister of State for Education	Seet Ai Mee	28 November 1990	30 June 1991
Minister of State for Education	Sidek Saniff	1 July 1991	6 September 1991
Senior Parliamentary Secretary for Education	Sidek Saniff	28 November 1990	30 June 1991
Parliamentary Secretary for Education	Tang Guan Seng	28 November 1990	6 September 1991
Ministry of the Environment
Office	Name	Term start	Term end
Minister for the Environment	**Ahmad Mattar** (Note: Ahmad Mattar was concurrently the Minister-in-charge of Muslim Affairs.)	28 November 1990	6 September 1991
Ministry of Finance
Office	Name	Term start	Term end
Minister for Finance	**Richard Hu**	28 November 1990	6 September 1991
Ministry of Foreign Affairs
Office	Name	Term start	Term end
Minister for Foreign Affairs	**Wong Kan Seng**	28 November 1990	6 September 1991
Second Minister for Foreign Affairs	**George Yeo**	1 July 1991	6 September 1991
Senior Minister of State for Foreign Affairs	George Yeo	28 November 1990	30 June 1991
Parliamentary Secretary for Foreign Affairs	Yatiman Yusof	27 November 1990	6 September 1991
Ministry of Health
Office	Name	Term start	Term end
Minister for Health	**Yeo Cheow Tong**	28 November 1990	6 September 1991
Minister of State for Health	Aline Wong	28 November 1990	6 September 1991
Ministry of Home Affairs
Office	Name	Term start	Term end
Minister for Home Affairs	**S. Jayakumar**	28 November 1990	6 September 1991
Minister of State for Home Affairs	Peter Sung	28 November 1990	6 September 1991
Parliamentary Secretary for Home Affairs	Tang Guan Seng	28 November 1990	6 September 1991
Ministry for Information and the Arts
Office	Name	Term start	Term end
Minister for Information and the Arts	**George Yeo** (Note: In an acting capacity until 30 June 1991.)	28 November 1990	6 September 1991
Senior Parliamentary Secretary for Information and the Arts	Ho Kah Leong	28 November 1990	6 September 1991
Ministry of Labour
Office	Name	Term start	Term end
Minister for Labour	**Lee Yock Suan**	28 November 1990	6 September 1991
Ministry of Law
Office	Name	Term start	Term end
Minister for Law	**S. Jayakumar**	28 November 1990	6 September 1991
Ministry of National Development
Office	Name	Term start	Term end
Minister for National Development	**S. Dhanabalan**	28 November 1990	6 September 1991
Minister of State for National Development	Peter Sung	28 November 1990	6 September 1991
Senior Parliamentary Secretary for National Development	Lee Yiok Seng	28 November 1990	6 September 1991
Ministry of Trade and Industry
Office	Name	Term start	Term end
Minister for Trade and Industry	**Lee Hsien Loong**	28 November 1990	6 September 1991
Minister of State for Trade and Industry	Mah Bow Tan	28 November 1990	6 September 1991
