= Minister-in-charge of Muslim Affairs =

Singaporean cabinet position

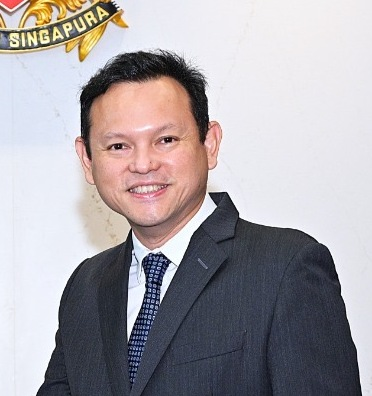
- Incumbent; Zaqy Mohamad; Acting since 20 July 2026
- Member of: Cabinet of Singapore; Parliament of Singapore
- Reports to: Prime Minister of Singapore
- Appointer: Prime Minister of Singapore
- Term length: At the Prime Minister's pleasure
- Formation: 5 September 1977; 49 years ago
- First holder: Ahmad Mattar

The Minister-in-charge of Muslim Affairs is a special appointment in the Cabinet of Singapore that oversees policies and issues related to the Muslim community in Singapore. Established in 1977, all officeholders have been a part of said community and the minister also oversees the Administration of Muslim Law Act. T.

== Responsibilities ==
The Minister-in-charge of Muslim Affairs recommends members to be appointed onto Majlis Ugama Islam Singapura's (MUIS) executive council. Under the Administration of Muslim Law Act, the Minister also ensures that laws which are relevant to Muslims in Singapore are applied properly. The Minister can also propose or support new amendments impacting Muslim-related areas such as laws regarding religious schools or mosques.

== List of officeholders ==
The incumbent Acting Minister is Zaqy Mohamad, an MP for Marsiling–Yew Tee GRC from the People's Action Party.

Minister	Took office	Left office	Party	Cabinet
Ahmad Mattar; MP for Brickworks and Brickworks GRC (born 1940)	5 September 1977	30 June 1993	PAP	Lee K. V
Ahmad Mattar; MP for Brickworks and Brickworks GRC (born 1940)	5 September 1977	30 June 1993	PAP	Lee K. VI
Ahmad Mattar; MP for Brickworks and Brickworks GRC (born 1940)	5 September 1977	30 June 1993	PAP	Lee K. VII
Ahmad Mattar; MP for Brickworks and Brickworks GRC (born 1940)	5 September 1977	30 June 1993	PAP	Lee K. VIII
Ahmad Mattar; MP for Brickworks and Brickworks GRC (born 1940)	5 September 1977	30 June 1993	PAP	Goh I
Ahmad Mattar; MP for Brickworks and Brickworks GRC (born 1940)	5 September 1977	30 June 1993	PAP	Goh II
Abdullah Tarmugi; MP for Bedok GRC and East Coast GRC (born 1944)	30 June 1993	24 March 2002	PAP	Goh II
Abdullah Tarmugi; MP for Bedok GRC and East Coast GRC (born 1944)	30 June 1993	24 March 2002	PAP	Goh III
Abdullah Tarmugi; MP for Bedok GRC and East Coast GRC (born 1944)	30 June 1993	24 March 2002	PAP	Goh IV
Yaacob Ibrahim; MP for Jalan Besar GRC and Moulmein–Kallang GRC (born 1955)	25 March 2002	30 April 2018	PAP	Goh IV
Yaacob Ibrahim; MP for Jalan Besar GRC and Moulmein–Kallang GRC (born 1955)	25 March 2002	30 April 2018	PAP	Lee H. I
Yaacob Ibrahim; MP for Jalan Besar GRC and Moulmein–Kallang GRC (born 1955)	25 March 2002	30 April 2018	PAP	Lee H. II
Yaacob Ibrahim; MP for Jalan Besar GRC and Moulmein–Kallang GRC (born 1955)	25 March 2002	30 April 2018	PAP	Lee H. III
Yaacob Ibrahim; MP for Jalan Besar GRC and Moulmein–Kallang GRC (born 1955)	25 March 2002	30 April 2018	PAP	Lee H. IV
Masagos Zulkifli; MP for Tampines GRC (born 1963)	1 May 2018	22 May 2025	PAP	Lee H. IV
Masagos Zulkifli; MP for Tampines GRC (born 1963)	1 May 2018	22 May 2025	PAP	Lee H. V
Masagos Zulkifli; MP for Tampines GRC (born 1963)	1 May 2018	22 May 2025	PAP	Wong I
Muhammad Faishal Ibrahim; MP for Marine Parade-Braddell Heights GRC (born 1968); Acting	23 May 2025	20 July 2026	PAP	Wong II
Zaqy Mohamad; MP for Marsiling–Yew Tee GRC (born 1974); Acting	20 July 2026	Incumbent	PAP	Wong II
