= Eighth Lee Kuan Yew Cabinet =

- 8th Cabinet of Singapore

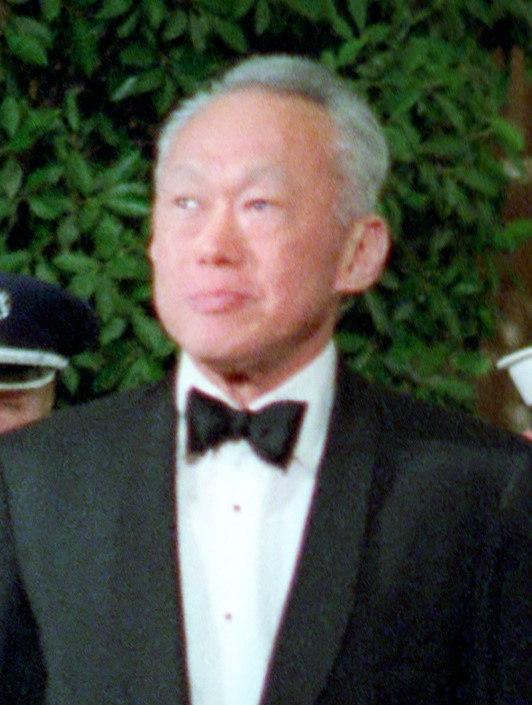
- Date formed: 13 September 1988
- Date dissolved: 27 November 1990

People and organisations
- Head of state: Wee Kim Wee
- Head of government: Lee Kuan Yew
- Deputy head of government: Goh Chok Tong; Ong Teng Cheong
- Member party: People's Action Party
- Status in legislature: Supermajority
- Opposition party: Singapore Democratic Party
- Opposition leader: Chiam See Tong

History
- Legislature term: 7th Parliament of Singapore
- Predecessor: Seventh Lee Kuan Yew Cabinet
- Successor: First Goh Chok Tong Cabinet

The Eighth Lee Kuan Yew Cabinet is the eighth Cabinet of Singapore formed by Prime Minister Lee Kuan Yew. It was formed in 1989 after the 1988 Singaporean general election.

== Cabinet ==
The Eighth Lee Kuan Yew Cabinet was composed of the following members.

Portfolio	Name	Term
Prime Minister	Lee Kuan Yew	5 June 1959 – 28 November 1990
First Deputy Prime Minister	Goh Chok Tong	2 January 1985 – 28 November 1990
Second Deputy Prime Minister	Ong Teng Cheong	2 January 1985 – 28 November 1990
Minister for Defence	Goh Chok Tong	1 June 1982 – 30 June 1991
Second Minister for Defence (Policy)	Yeo Ning Hong	1 January 1987 – 28 November 1990
Second Minister for Defence (Services)	Lee Hsien Loong	1 January 1987 – 28 November 1990
Minister for National Development	S. Dhanabalan	1 January 1987 – 31 August 1992
Minister for Education	Tony Tan	2 January 1985 – 1 January 1992
Minister for the Environment	Ahmad Mattar	2 January 1985 – 30 June 1993
Minister for Communications and Information	Yeo Ning Hong	2 January 1985 – 28 November 1990
Minister for Law	S. Jayakumar	13 September 1988 – 30 April 2008
Minister for Home Affairs	S. Jayakumar	2 January 1985 – 1 January 1994
Minister for Finance	Richard Hu	7 May 1985 – 9 November 2001
Minister for Labour	Lee Yock Suan	1 January 1987 – 1 January 1992
Minister for Foreign Affairs	Wong Kan Seng	13 September 1988 – 1 January 1994
Minister for Community Development	Wong Kan Seng	1 January 1987 – 30 June 1991
Minister for Trade and Industry	Lee Hsien Loong	1 January 1987 – 6 December 1992
Minister for Health	Yeo Cheow Tong	1 January 1987 – 28 November 1990 (acting)

== List of office holders ==
The following is the list of office holders in the Eighth Lee Kuan Yew Cabinet. Cabinet members are listed in bold.

Prime Minister's Office
Office	Name	Term start	Term end
Prime Minister	**Lee Kuan Yew**	13 September 1988	27 November 1990
First Deputy Prime Minister	**Goh Chok Tong**	13 September 1988	27 November 1990
Second Deputy Prime Minister	**Ong Teng Cheong**	13 September 1988	1 August 1993
Ministry of Communications and Information
Office	Name	Term start	Term end
Minister for Communications and Information	**Yeo Ning Hong**	13 September 1988	27 November 1990
Minister of State for Communications and Information	Mah Bow Tan	1 October 1988	27 November 1990
Senior Parliamentary Secretary for Communications and Information	Ho Kah Leong	13 September 1988	27 November 1990
Ministry of Community Development
Office	Name	Term start	Term end
Minister for Community Development	**Wong Kan Seng**	13 September 1988	27 November 1990
Minister of State for Community Development	Ch'ng Jit Koon	13 September 1988	27 November 1990
Minister of State for Community Development	Seet Ai Mee	1 November 1988	27 November 1990
Ministry of Defence
Office	Name	Term start	Term end
Minister for Defence	**Goh Chok Tong**	13 September 1988	27 November 1990
Second Minister for Defence (Policy)	**Yeo Ning Hong**	13 September 1988	27 November 1990
Second Minister for Defence (Services)	**Lee Hsien Loong**	13 September 1988	27 November 1990
Ministry of Education
Office	Name	Term start	Term end
Minister for Education	**Tony Tan**	13 September 1988	27 November 1990
Senior Minister of State for Education	Tay Eng Soon	13 September 1988	27 November 1990
Minister of State for Education	Seet Ai Mee	1 November 1988	27 November 1990
Senior Parliamentary Secretary for Education	Sidek Saniff	13 September 1988	27 November 1990
Parliamentary Secretary for Education	Tang Guan Seng	13 September 1988	27 November 1990
Ministry of the Environment
Office	Name	Term start	Term end
Minister for the Environment	**Ahmad Mattar**	13 September 1988	27 November 1990
Senior Parliamentary Secretary for the Environment	Eugene Yap	13 September 1988	25 January 1990
Ministry of Finance
Office	Name	Term start	Term end
Minister for Finance	**Richard Hu**	13 September 1988	27 November 1990
Minister of State for Finance	George Yeo	13 September 1988	27 November 1990
Ministry of Foreign Affairs
Office	Name	Term start	Term end
Minister for Foreign Affairs	**Wong Kan Seng**	13 September 1988	27 November 1990
Senior Minister of State for Foreign Affairs	Yeo Cheow Tong	13 September 1988	27 November 1990
Minister of State for Foreign Affairs	Peter Sung	1 November 1988	27 November 1990
Minister of State for Foreign Affairs	George Yeo	13 September 1988	27 November 1990
Parliamentary Secretary for Foreign Affairs	Yatiman Yusof	13 September 1988	27 November 1990
Ministry of Health
Office	Name	Term start	Term end
Minister for Health	**Yeo Cheow Tong** (Note: In an acting capacity.)	13 September 1988	27 November 1990
Senior Minister of State for Health	Yeo Cheow Tong	13 September 1988	27 November 1990
Ministry of Home Affairs
Office	Name	Term start	Term end
Minister for Home Affairs	**S. Jayakumar**	13 September 1988	27 November 1990
Senior Minister of State for Home Affairs	Lee Boon Yang	13 September 1988	27 November 1990
Parliamentary Secretary for Home Affairs	Tang Guan Seng	13 September 1988	27 November 1990
Ministry of Labour
Office	Name	Term start	Term end
Minister for Labour	**Lee Yock Suan**	13 September 1988	27 November 1990
Ministry of Law
Office	Name	Term start	Term end
Minister for Law	**S. Jayakumar**	13 September 1988	27 November 1990
Ministry of National Development
Office	Name	Term start	Term end
Minister for National Development	**S. Dhanabalan**	13 September 1988	27 November 1990
Senior Minister of State for National Development	Lee Boon Yang	13 September 1988	27 November 1990
Minister of State for National Development	Peter Sung	1 November 1988	27 November 1990
Senior Parliamentary Secretary for National Development	Lee Yiok Seng	13 September 1988	27 November 1990
Ministry of Trade and Industry
Office	Name	Term start	Term end
Minister for Trade and Industry	**Lee Hsien Loong**	13 September 1988	27 November 1990
Minister of State for Trade and Industry	Mah Bow Tan	1 October 1988	27 November 1990
Senior Parliamentary Secretary for Trade and Industry	Eugene Yap	13 September 1988	25 January 1990
