= Seventh Lee Kuan Yew Cabinet =

Seventh cabinet of Singapore formed by Prime Minister Lee Kuan Yew in 1985

- 7th Cabinet of Singapore

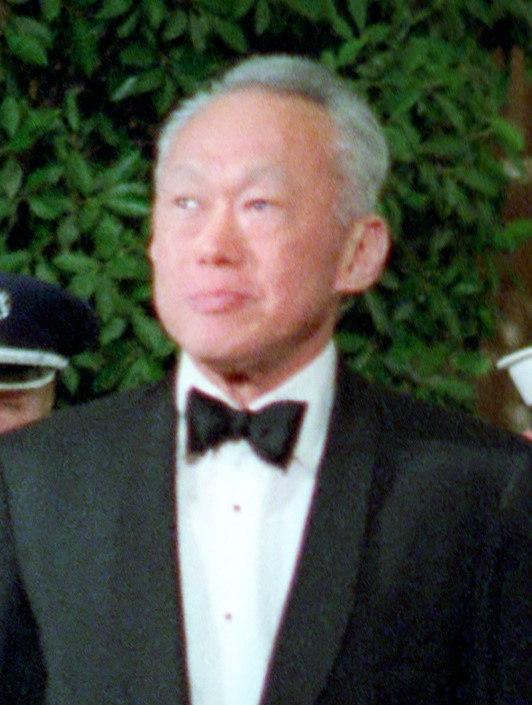
- Date formed: 2 January 1985
- Date dissolved: 12 September 1988

People and organisations
- Head of state: Devan Nair (until 28 March 1985); Wee Chong Jin (acting: 28–31 March 1985); Yeoh Ghim Seng (acting: 31 March – 2 September 1985); Wee Kim Wee (from 2 September 1985)
- Head of government: Lee Kuan Yew
- Deputy head of government: Goh Chok Tong; Ong Teng Cheong
- Member party: People's Action Party
- Status in legislature: Supermajority
- Opposition party: Workers' Party (until 10 November 1986); Singapore Democratic Party
- Opposition leader: J. B. Jeyaretnam (until 10 November 1986); Chiam See Tong (from 10 November 1986)

History
- Election: 1984
- Legislature term: 6th Parliament of Singapore
- Predecessor: Sixth Lee Kuan Yew Cabinet
- Successor: Eighth Lee Kuan Yew Cabinet

The Seventh Lee Kuan Yew Cabinet is the seventh Cabinet of Singapore formed by Prime Minister Lee Kuan Yew. It was formed in 1985 after the 1984 Singaporean general election.

== Cabinet ==
The Seventh Lee Kuan Yew Cabinet was composed of the following members.

Portfolio	Name	Term
Prime Minister	Lee Kuan Yew	5 June 1959 – 28 November 1990
Senior Minister	S. Rajaratnam	2 January 1985 – 12 September 1988
First Deputy Prime Minister	Goh Chok Tong	2 January 1985 – 28 November 1990
Second Deputy Prime Minister	Ong Teng Cheong	2 January 1985 – 28 November 1990
Minister for Defence	Goh Chok Tong	1 June 1982 – 30 June 1991
Second Minister for Defence	Yeo Ning Hong	1 June 1984 – 31 December 1986
Second Minister for Defence (Services)	Lee Hsien Loong	1 January 1987 – 28 November 1990
Second Minister for Defence (Policy)	Yeo Ning Hong	1 January 1987 – 28 November 1990
Minister for Law	E. W. Barker	2 June 1975 – 12 September 1988
Second Minister for Law	S. Jayakumar	1 June 1984 – 12 September 1988
Minister for National Development	Teh Cheang Wan	1 February 1979 – 14 December 1986
Minister for National Development	S. Dhanabalan	1 January 1987 – 31 August 1992
Second Minister for National Development	Yeo Ning Hong	2 January 1985 – 6 May 1985
Minister for Foreign Affairs	S. Dhanabalan	1 June 1980 – 12 September 1988
Second Minister for Foreign Affairs	Wong Kan Seng	1 January 1987 – 12 September 1988
Minister for Community Development	S. Dhanabalan	2 January 1985 – 17 February 1986
Minister for Community Development	Wong Kan Seng	18 February 1986 – 31 December 1986 (acting), 1 January 1987 – 30 June 1991
Minister for Finance	Tony Tan	24 October 1983 – 6 May 1985
Minister for Finance	Richard Hu	7 May 1985 – 9 November 2001
Minister for Education	Tony Tan	2 January 1985 – 1 January 1992
Minister for Health	Tony Tan	2 January 1985 – 6 May 1985
Minister for Health	Richard Hu	7 May 1985 – 31 December 1986
Minister for Health	Yeo Cheow Tong	1 January 1987 – 28 November 1990 (acting)
Minister for the Environment	Ahmad Mattar	2 January 1985 – 30 June 1993
Minister for Communications and Information	Yeo Ning Hong	2 January 1985 – 28 November 1990
Minister for Home Affairs	S. Jayakumar	2 January 1985 – 1 January 1994
Minister for Trade and Industry	Richard Hu	2 January 1985 – 6 May 1985
Minister for Trade and Industry	Tony Tan	7 May 1985 – 17 February 1986
Minister for Trade and Industry	Lee Hsien Loong	18 February 1986 – 31 December 1986 (acting), 1 January 1987 – 6 December 1992
Minister for Labour	Lee Yock Suan	2 January 1985 – 31 December 1986 (acting), 1 January 1987 – 1 January 1992

== List of office holders ==
The following is the list of office holders in the Seventh Lee Kuan Yew Cabinet. Cabinet members are listed in bold.

Prime Minister's Office
Office	Name	Term start	Term end
Prime Minister	**Lee Kuan Yew**	2 January 1985	12 September 1988
Senior Minister	**S. Rajaratnam**	2 January 1985	12 September 1988
First Deputy Prime Minister	**Goh Chok Tong**	2 January 1985	12 September 1988
Second Deputy Prime Minister	**Ong Teng Cheong**	2 January 1985	12 September 1988
Minister of State for the Prime Minister's Office	Wan Soon Bee	2 January 1985	1 January 1986
Ministry of Communications and Information
Office	Name	Term start	Term end
Minister for Communications and Information	**Yeo Ning Hong**	2 January 1985	12 September 1988
Minister of State for Communications and Information	Tay Eng Soon	2 January 1985	17 February 1986
Minister of State for Communications and Information	Wong Kan Seng	7 May 1985	31 December 1986
Senior Parliamentary Secretary for Communications and Information	Ho Kah Leong	18 February 1986	12 September 1988
Parliamentary Secretary for Communications and Information	Wan Hussin Zoohri	2 January 1985	1 January 1986
Parliamentary Secretary for Communications and Information	Lee Boon Yang	1 February 1985	6 May 1985
Ministry of Community Development
Office	Name	Term start	Term end
Minister for Community Development	**S. Dhanabalan**	2 January 1985	17 February 1986
Minister for Community Development	**Wong Kan Seng** (Note: In an acting capacity until 31 December 1986.)	18 February 1986	12 September 1988
Minister of State for Community Development	Ch'ng Jit Koon	2 January 1985	12 September 1988
Minister of State for Community Development	Wong Kan Seng	1 March 1985	17 February 1986
Parliamentary Secretary for Community Development	Teo Cheong Tee	2 January 1985	31 March 1986
Ministry of Defence
Office	Name	Term start	Term end
Minister for Defence	**Goh Chok Tong**	2 January 1985	12 September 1988
Second Minister for Defence	**Yeo Ning Hong**	2 January 1985	31 December 1986
Second Minister for Defence (Services)	**Lee Hsien Loong**	1 January 1987	12 September 1988
Second Minister for Defence (Policy)	**Yeo Ning Hong**	1 January 1987	12 September 1988
Minister of State for Defence	Lee Hsien Loong	2 January 1985	31 December 1986
Senior Parliamentary Secretary for Defence	Phua Bah Lee	2 January 1985	12 September 1988
Ministry of Education
Office	Name	Term start	Term end
Minister for Education	**Tony Tan**	2 January 1985	12 September 1988
Minister of State for Education	Tay Eng Soon	2 January 1985	12 September 1988
Senior Parliamentary Secretary for Education	Ho Kah Leong	2 January 1985	17 February 1986
Parliamentary Secretary for Education	Tang Guan Seng	18 February 1986	12 September 1988
Ministry of the Environment
Office	Name	Term start	Term end
Minister for the Environment	**Ahmad Mattar**	2 January 1985	12 September 1988
Senior Parliamentary Secretary for the Environment	Eugene Yap	7 May 1985	12 September 1988
Parliamentary Secretary for the Environment	Lee Boon Yang	1 February 1985	6 May 1985
Ministry of Finance
Office	Name	Term start	Term end
Minister for Finance	**Tony Tan**	2 January 1985	6 May 1985
Minister for Finance	**Richard Hu**	7 May 1985	12 September 1988
Parliamentary Secretary for Finance	Lee Boon Yang	7 May 1985	17 February 1986
Ministry of Foreign Affairs
Office	Name	Term start	Term end
Minister for Foreign Affairs	**S. Dhanabalan**	2 January 1985	12 September 1988
Second Minister for Foreign Affairs	**Wong Kan Seng**	1 January 1987	12 September 1988
Minister of State for Foreign Affairs	Yeo Cheow Tong	9 February 1985	1 January 1987
Parliamentary Secretary for Foreign Affairs	Yatiman Yusof	1 April 1986	12 September 1988
Ministry of Health
Office	Name	Term start	Term end
Minister for Health	**Tony Tan**	2 January 1985	6 May 1985
Minister for Health	**Richard Hu**	7 May 1985	31 December 1986
Minister for Health	**Yeo Cheow Tong** (Note: In an acting capacity.)	1 January 1987	12 September 1988
Minister of State for Health	Yeo Cheow Tong	9 February 1985	31 December 1986
Ministry of Home Affairs
Office	Name	Term start	Term end
Minister for Home Affairs	**S. Jayakumar**	2 January 1985	12 September 1988
Minister of State for Home Affairs	Wong Kan Seng	1 March 1985	6 May 1985
Minister of State for Home Affairs	Lee Boon Yang	18 February 1986	12 September 1988
Senior Parliamentary Secretary for Home Affairs	Chin Harn Tong	2 January 1985	12 September 1988
Parliamentary Secretary for Home Affairs	Lee Boon Yang	7 May 1985	17 February 1986
Ministry of Labour
Office	Name	Term start	Term end
Minister for Labour	**Lee Yock Suan**	2 January 1985	1 January 1992
Senior Minister of State for Labour	Lee Yock Suan	2 January 1985	31 December 1986
Senior Parliamentary Secretary for Labour	Eugene Yap	2 January 1985	6 May 1985
Ministry of Law
Office	Name	Term start	Term end
Minister for Law	**E. W. Barker**	2 January 1985	12 September 1988
Second Minister for Law	**S. Jayakumar**	2 January 1985	12 September 1988
Ministry of National Development
Office	Name	Term start	Term end
Minister for National Development	**Teh Cheang Wan**	2 January 1985	14 December 1986
Minister for National Development	**S. Dhanabalan**	1 January 1987	12 September 1988
Second Minister for National Development	**Yeo Ning Hong**	2 January 1985	6 May 1985
Minister of State for National Development	Lee Boon Yang	2 January 1985	12 September 1988
Senior Parliamentary Secretary for National Development	Lee Yiok Seng	2 January 1985	12 September 1988
Ministry of Trade and Industry
Office	Name	Term start	Term end
Minister for Trade and Industry	**Richard Hu**	2 January 1985	6 May 1985
Minister for Trade and Industry	**Tony Tan**	7 May 1985	17 February 1986
Minister for Trade and Industry	**Lee Hsien Loong**	18 February 1986	12 September 1988
Minister of State for Trade and Industry	Lee Hsien Loong	2 January 1985	17 February 1986
Minister of State for Trade and Industry	Wong Kwei Cheong	2 January 1985	1 January 1986
Minister of State for Trade and Industry	Lee Boon Yang	18 February 1986	31 December 1986
Senior Parliamentary Secretary for Trade and Industry	Eugene Yap	1 January 1987	12 September 1988
Parliamentary Secretary for Trade and Industry	Sidek Saniff	2 January 1985	12 September 1988
