= Ministry of Community Development, Youth and Sports =

Singaporean government ministry

Agency overview
- Formed: 1 September 2004; 21 years ago
- Dissolved: 1 November 2012; 13 years ago
- Superseding agency: Ministry of Social and Family Development Ministry of Culture, Community and Youth
- Jurisdiction: Government of Singapore
- Headquarters: MCYS Building, 512 Thomson Road, Singapore 298136
- Employees: 5,063 (FY2011)
- Annual budget: S$1.83 billion (FY2011)
- Child agencies: Sport Singapore; Majlis Ugama Islam Singapura; National Council of Social Service; People's Association
- Website: www.mcys.gov.sg

The Ministry of Community Development, Youth and Sports (MCYS) was a ministry of the Government of Singapore tasked with building a "cohesive and resilient" society in Singapore.

On 1 November 2012, the MCYS was restructured and became the Ministry of Social and Family Development (MSF). Several portfolios such as Youth Development and Sports was shifted to a new Ministry, the Ministry of Culture, Community and Youth (MCCY).

== Responsibilities ==
The MCYS pursues social engineering campaigns of varying effectiveness. However, it also tries to encourage widespread youth participation, constructive social activity such as sport and volunteerism. It also tries to encourage acceptance of individual differences among youth.

MCYS has produced various campaigns to address issues such as filial piety to parents and the falling birthrate. Its three-minute short film promoting filial piety, in using more subtle and indirect artistic techniques compared to previous decades' campaigns, found local critical success and won MediaCorp's Viewer's Choice gold award and caused the page "Filial Piety" to receive over 40,000 likes on Facebook.

The MCYS seeks to make Singaporeans "socially responsible individuals", create "inspired and committed Youth" and is a ministry explicitly devoted towards family values ("strong and stable families"). It also seeks to create a "caring and active community" and to promote healthy, sportful lifestyles. It wishes to promote integration of people with disabilities into wider society, and prevent "youths-at-risk" from falling into juvenile delinquency. It also tries to encourage seniors to practice "active aging".

== National Campaigns ==
- "Filial Piety" in 2010
- "A Girl's Hope" in 2010
- "Beautifully Imperfect" in 2009
- "Family" in 2008
- "Excuses" in 2008

== Ministers ==
The Ministry was previously led by the Minister for Community Development, Youth and Sports, who was appointed as part of the Cabinet of Singapore.

=== Minister for Home Affairs and Social Welfare (1963) ===
Minister	Took office	Left office	Party	Cabinet
Othman Wok; MP for Pasir Panjang (1924–2017)	19 October 1963	27 November 1963	PAP	Lee K. II

=== Minister for Social Affairs (1963–1985) ===
Minister	Took office	Left office	Party	Cabinet
Othman Wok; MP for Pasir Panjang (1924–2017)	28 November 1963	30 June 1977	PAP	Lee K. II
Othman Wok; MP for Pasir Panjang (1924–2017)	28 November 1963	30 June 1977	PAP	Lee K. III
Othman Wok; MP for Pasir Panjang (1924–2017)	28 November 1963	30 June 1977	PAP	Lee K. IV
Othman Wok; MP for Pasir Panjang (1924–2017)	28 November 1963	30 June 1977	PAP	Lee K. V
Toh Chin Chye; MP for Rochore (1921–2012); Acting	1 July 1977	4 September 1977	PAP	Lee K. V
Ahmad Mattar (Note: Ahmad Mattar served as acting minister from 5 September 1977 until 31 May 1984.); MP for Brickworks (born 1940)	5 September 1977	31 May 1984	PAP	Lee K. V
Ahmad Mattar; MP for Brickworks (born 1940)	5 September 1977	31 May 1984	PAP	Lee K. VI
Ahmad Mattar; MP for Brickworks (born 1940)	1 June 1984	1 January 1985	PAP	Lee K. VI

=== Minister for Community Development (1985–2000) ===
Minister	Took office	Left office	Party	Cabinet
S. Dhanabalan; MP for Kallang (born 1937)	2 January 1985	17 February 1986	PAP	Lee K. VII
Wong Kan Seng (Note: Wong Kan Seng served as acting minister from 18 February until 31 December 1986.); MP for Kuo Chuan (born 1946)	18 February 1986	31 December 1986	PAP	Lee K. VII
Wong Kan Seng; MP for Kuo Chuan (born 1946)	1 January 1987	30 June 1991	PAP	Lee K. VII
Wong Kan Seng; MP for Kuo Chuan (born 1946)	1 January 1987	30 June 1991	PAP	Lee K. VIII
Wong Kan Seng; MP for Kuo Chuan (born 1946)	1 January 1987	30 June 1991	PAP	Goh I
Seet Ai Mee; MP for Bukit Gombak SMC (born 1943); Acting	1 July 1991	31 August 1991	PAP	Goh I
Yeo Cheow Tong; MP for Hong Kah GRC (born 1947)	7 September 1991	1 January 1994	PAP	Goh II
Abdullah Tarmugi (Note: Abdullah Tarmugi served as acting minister from 2 January 1994 until 14 January 1996.); MP for Bedok GRC (until 1996) and East Coast GRC (from 1997) (born 1944)	2 January 1994	14 January 1996	PAP	Goh II
Abdullah Tarmugi; MP for Bedok GRC (until 1996) and East Coast GRC (from 1997) (born 1944)	15 January 1996	31 March 2000	PAP	Goh II
Abdullah Tarmugi; MP for Bedok GRC (until 1996) and East Coast GRC (from 1997) (born 1944)	15 January 1996	31 March 2000	PAP	Goh III

=== Minister for Community Development and Sports (2000–2004) ===
Minister	Took office	Left office	Party	Cabinet
Abdullah Tarmugi; MP for East Coast GRC (born 1944)	1 April 2000	24 March 2002	PAP	Goh III
Abdullah Tarmugi; MP for East Coast GRC (born 1944)	1 April 2000	24 March 2002	PAP	Goh IV
Yaacob Ibrahim (Note: Yaacob Ibrahim served as acting minister from 25 March 2002 until 11 May 2003.); MP for Jalan Besar GRC (born 1955)	25 March 2002	11 May 2003	PAP	Goh IV
Yaacob Ibrahim; MP for Jalan Besar GRC (born 1955)	12 May 2003	11 August 2004	PAP	Goh IV

=== Minister for Community Development, Youth and Sports (2004–2012) ===
Minister	Took office	Left office	Party	Cabinet
Vivian Balakrishnan (Note: Vivian Balakrishnan served as acting minister from 12 August 2004 until 31 March 2005.); MP for Holland–Bukit Panjang GRC (until 2006) and for Holland–Bukit Timah GRC (from 2006) (born 1961)	12 August 2004	31 March 2005	PAP	Lee H. I
Vivian Balakrishnan; MP for Holland–Bukit Panjang GRC (until 2006) and for Holland–Bukit Timah GRC (from 2006) (born 1961)	1 April 2005	20 May 2011	PAP	Lee H. I
Vivian Balakrishnan; MP for Holland–Bukit Panjang GRC (until 2006) and for Holland–Bukit Timah GRC (from 2006) (born 1961)	1 April 2005	20 May 2011	PAP	Lee H. II
Chan Chun Sing; MP for Tanjong Pagar GRC (born 1969); Acting	21 May 2011	31 October 2012	PAP	Lee H. III
