= Ow Chin Hock =

Singaporean former politician and educator

- 欧进福

Member of Parliament for Leng Kee Single Member Constituency
- In office 23 December 1976 – 16 December 1997
- Preceded by: Ahmad Mattar
- Succeeded by: Constituency abolished

Member of Parliament for Tanjong Pagar Group Representation Constituency (Leng Kee)
- In office 2 January 1997 – 18 October 2001
- Preceded by: Constituency established
- Succeeded by: Constituency abolished

Personal details
- Born: Ow Chin Hock; 1943 (age 82–83)
- Children: 1
- Education: Vanderbilt University

Ow Chin Hock (Note: Chinese: 欧进福; Pe̍h-ōe-jī: Au Chìn-hok; pinyin: Ōu Jìnfú) (born 1943) is a Singaporean educator and former politician. Ow was a member of the People's Action Party (PAP) and served as the Member of Parliament (MP) for Leng Kee Single Member Constituency from 1976 to 1997 and MP for the Tanjong Pagar Group Representation Constituency, representing the Leng Kee division, from 1997 to 2001. He released his Chinese memoirs, Memoirs Of Dr Ow Chin Hock, in May 2022.

== Early life ==
Ow went to Catholic High School. Ow was a graduate of the University of Singapore and received a doctorate in economics at Vanderbilt University.

== Career ==
=== Academic career ===
From 1967 to 1971, Ow worked as a research and teaching assistant at Vanderbilt University. Afterwards, he worked as a lecturer at the University of Singapore in the Department of Economics. From August 1974 to June 1975, he was the research advisor to the National Productivity Board.

=== Political career ===
In 1976, Ow made his political debut with the People's Action Party (PAP) at the 1976 Singaporean general election. He contested in the Leng Kee Single Member Constituency and became its Member of Parliament (MP) after he won with 76.76% of the vote against Ng Lep Chong of United Front's (UF) 23.24%. In 1979, Ow was appointed as the first chairman of the Speak Mandarin Campaign.

In 1980, Ow opened the Singapore Historical Photographs Exhibition by the Ministry of Culture and the National Archives and Records Centre. During the 1980 Singaporean general election, Ow remained as the MP representing Leng Kee Single Member Constituency when he was elected unopposed. In 1981, Ow was appointed Parliamentary Secretary to the Minister for Education.

In the 1984 Singaporean general election, he remained as the MP representing Leng Kee Single Member Constituency after he won against Workers' Party's (WP) George Benjamin Armstrong's 33.16% with his 66.84% of the vote.

In the next general election, Ow was the MP for Leng Kee Single Member Constituency again after he won against WP's Chua Chwee Huat Peter with 64.96% of the vote against Chua's 35.04%.

Ow remained as the MP for Leng Kee Single Member Constituency once more after beating Independent G. K. Niddy with 76.57% of the vote in the 1991 Singaporean general election against Niddy's 23.43%.

In 1997, after the dissolution of Leng Kee Single Member Constituency, Ow contested in the 1997 Singaporean general election for Tanjong Pagar Group Representation Constituency with Chay Wai Chuen, Koo Tsai Kee, Lee Kuan Yew, Lim Swee Say, and S. Vasoo. He represented the Leng Kee division. In 2001, he retired from politics.
