= Third Lee Hsien Loong Cabinet =

Cabinet of Singapore from 2011 to 2015

- 15th Cabinet of Singapore
- 2011–2015
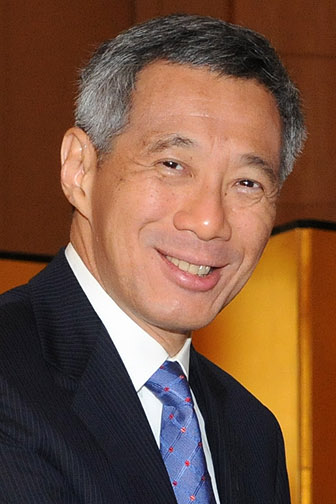
- Date formed: 21 May 2011
- Date dissolved: 30 September 2015

People and organizations
- Head of state: S. R. Nathan (until 1 September 2011); Tony Tan (from 1 September 2011)
- Head of government: Lee Hsien Loong
- Deputy head of government: Teo Chee Hean; Tharman Shanmugaratnam
- Member party: People's Action Party
- Status in legislature: Supermajority
- Opposition party: Workers' Party
- Opposition leader: Low Thia Khiang

History
- Election: 7 May 2011
- Legislature term: 12th
- Budget: 2012
- Predecessor: Second Lee Hsien Loong Cabinet
- Successor: Fourth Lee Hsien Loong Cabinet

The Third Cabinet of Lee Hsien Loong of the Government of Singapore came into existence on 21 May 2011 following the 2011 general election. While many of its members were retained from the previous government, Heng Swee Keat and Chan Chun Sing, who had both just been elected, were given ministerial appointments.

With effect from 1 August 2012, Grace Fu became only the second woman in Singapore's history to be made a full minister by being appointed a Minister in the Prime Minister's Office. (The first was Lim Hwee Hua.) From 1 November, Chan Chun Sing assumed the designation of Acting Minister for Social and Family Development, while Lawrence Wong was brought into the Cabinet for the first time as Acting Minister for Culture, Community and Youth.

== Cabinet ==
=== May 2011 – July 2012 ===
At the 2011 general election, Senior Minister Shunmugam Jayakumar did not contest his seat as part of the East Coast Group Representation Constituency and thus retired from the Cabinet. Foreign Minister George Yeo and Minister in the Prime Minister's Office Lim Hwee Hua contested Aljunied GRC unsuccessfully, and were defeated by a team from the Workers' Party of Singapore.

Following the election, on 14 May 2011, Minister Mentor Lee Kuan Yew and Senior Minister Goh Chok Tong tendered their resignations from the Cabinet, stating that they wished to give the Prime Minister a "fresh clean slate" in forming the Government and enable him to "have a completely younger team of ministers to connect to and engage with this young generation". Goh was given the honorary title of Emeritus Senior Minister; the same title was offered to Lee but he declined. Lee and Goh were appointed as senior advisers to the Government of Singapore Investment Corporation (GIC) and the Monetary Authority of Singapore (MAS) respectively.

Four days later, on 18 May, Prime Minister Lee Hsien Loong announced a new Cabinet line-up. In addition to Lee Kuan Yew, Goh Chok Tong, George Yeo and Lim Hwee Hua, four other ministers retired: Wong Kan Seng, Mah Bow Tan, Lim Boon Heng and Raymond Lim. Two ministers, Lim Hng Kiang and Lim Swee Say, retained their respective Trade and Industry and Prime Minister's Office portfolios, while existing ministers were appointed to new positions in the remaining 11 ministries. Tharman Shanmugaratnam was promoted to Deputy Prime Minister and appointed Minister for Manpower in addition to his portfolio of Minister for Finance, replacing Wong Kan Seng. S. Iswaran, formerly Senior Minister of State for Education and for Trade and Industry, was elevated to the Cabinet as Minister in the Prime Minister's Office, and Second Minister for Home Affairs and for Trade and Industry. Heng Swee Keat and Chan Chun Sing, both elected to Parliament for the first time, were respectively assigned the posts of Minister for Education, and Acting Minister for Community Development, Youth and Sports and Minister of State for the Ministry of Information, Communications and the Arts. Heng was the first new MP directly appointed a full minister since 1984.

With effect from 2011 general election:

Minister	Prior to 2011	Appointment
Lee Kuan Yew	Minister Mentor	Post removed, retaining as "Lee Kuan Yew" title until the death in 2015.
Goh Chok Tong	Senior Minister	Renamed the remaining post to 'Emeritus Senior Minister'.
Shunmugam Jayakumar	Senior Minister	Retired.
George Yeo	Minister for Foreign Affairs	Lost parliamentary seat and retired.
K Shanmugam	Minister for Home Affairs and Minister for Law	Relinquished Minister for Home Affairs, replaced by Minister for Foreign Affairs.
Teo Chee Hean	Deputy Prime Minister and Minister for Defence	Relinquished Minister for Defence, replaced by Minister for Home Affairs, and Coordinating Minister for National Security.
Ng Eng Hen	Minister for Education	Relinquished Minister for Education, replaced by Minister for Defence.
Heng Swee Keat		New position for Minister for Education.
Tharman Shanmugaratnam	Minister for Finance	Assumed two new positions for Deputy Prime Minister and Minister for Manpower respectively.
Lim Hwee Hua	Minister in the Prime Minister's Office; Second Minister for Finance and Second Minister for Transport	Lost parliamentary seat and retired.
Josephine Teo	Senior Minister of State for Finance and Transport	Assumed new position as Senior Minister of State for Finance and Transport respectively, and as a new minister.
Lim Boon Heng	Minister in the Prime Minister's Office	Retired.
Wong Kan Seng	Deputy Prime Minister and Coordinating Minister for National Security	Initially planned to retire, but returned to backbenches instead, only after the death of Lee Kuan Yew in 2015, he is allowed to retire.
Mah Bow Tan	Minister for National Development	Initially planned to retire, but returned to backbenches instead, only after the death of Lee Kuan Yew in 2015, he is allowed to retire.
Khaw Boon Wan	Minister for Health	Relinquished Minister for Health, replaced by Minister for National Development.
Gan Kim Yong	Minister for Manpower	Relinquished Minister for Manpower, replaced by Minister for Health.
Raymond Lim	Minister for Transport and Second Minister for Foreign Affairs	Returned to backbenches instead.
Lui Tuck Yew	Minister for Information, Communications and the Arts	Relinquished Minister for Information, Communications and the Arts, replaced by Minister for Transport.
Yaacob Ibrahim	Minister for the Environment and Water Resources	Relinquished Minister for the Environment and Water Resources, replaced by Minister for Information, Communications and the Arts.
Vivian Balakrishnan	Minister for Community Development, Youth and Sports	Relinquished Minister for Community Development, Youth and Sports, replaced by Minister for the Environment and Water Resources.
Chan Chun Sing		New position for Minister for Community Development, Youth and Sports.

With effect from 21 May 2011, the Cabinet of Singapore consisted of the following persons:

Portfolio	Portrait	Name	Term
Prime Minister	Lee Hsien Loong	Lee Hsien Loong	12 August 2004 – 15 May 2024
Deputy Prime Minister	Teo Chee Hean	Teo Chee Hean	1 April 2009 – 30 April 2019
Coordinating Minister for National Security	Teo Chee Hean	Teo Chee Hean	21 May 2011 – 22 May 2025
Minister for Home Affairs	Teo Chee Hean	Teo Chee Hean	21 May 2011 – 30 September 2015
Deputy Prime Minister	Tharman Shanmugaratnam	Tharman Shanmugaratnam	21 May 2011 – 30 April 2019
Minister for Finance	Tharman Shanmugaratnam	Tharman Shanmugaratnam	1 December 2007 – 30 September 2015
Minister for Manpower	Tharman Shanmugaratnam	Tharman Shanmugaratnam	21 May 2011 – 31 July 2012
Minister for Trade and Industry	Lim Hng Kiang	Lim Hng Kiang	12 August 2004 – 30 September 2015
Minister in the Prime Minister's Office	Lim Swee Say	Lim Swee Say	12 August 2004 – 3 May 2015
Minister for Information, Communications and the Arts	Yaacob Ibrahim	Yaacob Ibrahim	21 May 2011 – 31 October 2012
Minister-in-charge of Muslim Affairs	Yaacob Ibrahim	Yaacob Ibrahim	25 March 2002 – 30 April 2018
Minister for National Development	Khaw Boon Wan	Khaw Boon Wan	21 May 2011 – 30 September 2015
Minister for Defence	Ng Eng Hen	Ng Eng Hen	21 May 2011 – 22 May 2025
Minister for the Environment and Water Resources	Vivian Balakrishnan	Vivian Balakrishnan	21 May 2011 – 30 September 2015
Minister for Foreign Affairs	K. Shanmugam	K. Shanmugam	21 May 2011 – 30 September 2015
Minister for Law	K. Shanmugam	K. Shanmugam	1 May 2008 – 22 May 2025
Minister for Health	Gan Kim Yong	Gan Kim Yong	21 May 2011 – 14 May 2021
Minister for Transport	Lui Tuck Yew	Lui Tuck Yew	21 May 2011 – 30 September 2015
Second Minister for Foreign Affairs	Lui Tuck Yew	Lui Tuck Yew	21 May 2011 – 31 July 2012
Minister in the Prime Minister's Office	S. Iswaran	S. Iswaran	21 May 2011 – 30 September 2015
Second Minister for Home Affairs	S. Iswaran	S. Iswaran	21 May 2011 – 30 September 2015
Second Minister for Trade and Industry	S. Iswaran	S. Iswaran	21 May 2011 – 30 September 2015
Minister for Education	Heng Swee Keat	Heng Swee Keat	21 May 2011 – 30 September 2015
Acting Minister for Community Development, Youth and Sports	Chan Chun Sing	Chan Chun Sing	21 May 2011 – 31 October 2012

=== August 2012 – August 2013 ===
On 31 July 2012, Prime Minister Lee Hsien Loong announced several changes to his Cabinet and other appointments. With effect from 1 August, Grace Fu was promoted to Minister in the Prime Minister's Office, the second woman to be appointed a full minister in Singapore. Tharman Shanmugaratnam and Lui Tuck Yew relinquished their respective appointments as Minister for Manpower and Second Minister for Foreign Affairs to Tan Chuan-Jin and Grace Fu, while Yaacob Ibrahim became Minister for Communications and Information. With effect from 1 November, Chan Chun Sing was redesignated Acting Minister for Social and Family Development, while Lawrence Wong was brought into the Cabinet for the first time as Acting Minister for Culture, Community and Youth.

The changes to the cabinet do involves:

Minister	Prior to 2012	Appointment
Lawrence Wong	-	Appointed as Acting Minister for Culture, Community and Youth

Thus, as of 1 November 2012, the composition of the Cabinet was as follows:

Portfolio	Portrait	Name	Term
Prime Minister	Lee Hsien Loong	Lee Hsien Loong	12 August 2004 – 15 May 2024
Deputy Prime Minister	Teo Chee Hean	Teo Chee Hean	1 April 2009 – 30 April 2019
Coordinating Minister for National Security	Teo Chee Hean	Teo Chee Hean	21 May 2011 – 22 May 2025
Minister for Home Affairs	Teo Chee Hean	Teo Chee Hean	21 May 2011 – 30 September 2015
Deputy Prime Minister	Tharman Shanmugaratnam	Tharman Shanmugaratnam	21 May 2011 – 30 April 2019
Minister for Finance	Tharman Shanmugaratnam	Tharman Shanmugaratnam	1 December 2007 – 30 September 2015
Minister for Trade and Industry	Lim Hng Kiang	Lim Hng Kiang	12 August 2004 – 30 September 2015
Minister in the Prime Minister's Office	Lim Swee Say	Lim Swee Say	12 August 2004 – 3 May 2015
Minister for Information, Communications and the Arts	Yaacob Ibrahim	Yaacob Ibrahim	21 May 2011 – 31 October 2012
Minister for Communications and Information	Yaacob Ibrahim	Yaacob Ibrahim	1 November 2012 – 30 April 2018
Minister-in-charge of Muslim Affairs	Yaacob Ibrahim	Yaacob Ibrahim	25 March 2002 – 30 April 2018
Minister for National Development	Khaw Boon Wan	Khaw Boon Wan	21 May 2011 – 30 September 2015
Minister for Defence	Ng Eng Hen	Ng Eng Hen	21 May 2011 – 22 May 2025
Minister for the Environment and Water Resources	Vivian Balakrishnan	Vivian Balakrishnan	21 May 2011 – 30 September 2015
Minister for Foreign Affairs	K. Shanmugam	K. Shanmugam	21 May 2011 – 30 September 2015
Minister for Law	K. Shanmugam	K. Shanmugam	1 May 2008 – 22 May 2025
Minister for Health	Gan Kim Yong	Gan Kim Yong	21 May 2011 – 14 May 2021
Minister for Transport	Lui Tuck Yew	Lui Tuck Yew	21 May 2011 – 30 September 2015
Minister in the Prime Minister's Office	S. Iswaran	S. Iswaran	21 May 2011 – 30 September 2015
Second Minister for Home Affairs	S. Iswaran	S. Iswaran	21 May 2011 – 30 September 2015
Second Minister for Trade and Industry	S. Iswaran	S. Iswaran	21 May 2011 – 30 September 2015
Minister for Education	Heng Swee Keat	Heng Swee Keat	21 May 2011 – 30 September 2015
Minister in the Prime Minister's Office	Grace Fu	Grace Fu	1 August 2012 – 30 September 2015
Second Minister for the Environment and Water Resources	Grace Fu	Grace Fu	1 August 2012 – 30 September 2015
Second Minister for Foreign Affairs	Grace Fu	Grace Fu	1 August 2012 – 30 September 2015
Acting Minister for Community Development, Youth and Sports	Chan Chun Sing	Chan Chun Sing	21 May 2011 – 31 October 2012
Acting Minister for Social and Family Development	Chan Chun Sing	Chan Chun Sing	1 November 2012 – 31 August 2013
Acting Minister for Manpower		Tan Chuan-Jin	1 August 2012 – 30 April 2014
Acting Minister for Culture, Community and Youth	Lawrence Wong	Lawrence Wong	1 November 2012 – 30 April 2014

=== September 2013 – April 2014 ===
On 28 August 2013, Prime Minister Lee Hsien Loong announced several changes to his Cabinet and other appointments. With effect from 1 September, Chan Chun Sing was promoted to the full Minister and will continue to helm the Ministry of Social and Family Development. Mr. Chan was also appointed the second minister for the Ministry of Defence.

Thus, as of 1 September 2013, the composition of the Cabinet was as follows:

Portfolio	Portrait	Name	Term
Prime Minister	Lee Hsien Loong	Lee Hsien Loong	12 August 2004 – 15 May 2024
Deputy Prime Minister	Teo Chee Hean	Teo Chee Hean	1 April 2009 – 30 April 2019
Coordinating Minister for National Security	Teo Chee Hean	Teo Chee Hean	21 May 2011 – 22 May 2025
Minister for Home Affairs	Teo Chee Hean	Teo Chee Hean	21 May 2011 – 30 September 2015
Deputy Prime Minister	Tharman Shanmugaratnam	Tharman Shanmugaratnam	21 May 2011 – 30 April 2019
Minister for Finance	Tharman Shanmugaratnam	Tharman Shanmugaratnam	1 December 2007 – 30 September 2015
Minister for Trade and Industry	Lim Hng Kiang	Lim Hng Kiang	12 August 2004 – 30 September 2015
Minister in the Prime Minister's Office	Lim Swee Say	Lim Swee Say	12 August 2004 – 3 May 2015
Minister for Communications and Information	Yaacob Ibrahim	Yaacob Ibrahim	1 November 2012 – 30 April 2018
Minister-in-charge of Muslim Affairs	Yaacob Ibrahim	Yaacob Ibrahim	25 March 2002 – 30 April 2018
Minister for National Development	Khaw Boon Wan	Khaw Boon Wan	21 May 2011 – 30 September 2015
Minister for Defence	Ng Eng Hen	Ng Eng Hen	21 May 2011 – 22 May 2025
Minister for the Environment and Water Resources	Vivian Balakrishnan	Vivian Balakrishnan	21 May 2011 – 30 September 2015
Minister for Foreign Affairs	K. Shanmugam	K. Shanmugam	21 May 2011 – 30 September 2015
Minister for Law	K. Shanmugam	K. Shanmugam	1 May 2008 – 22 May 2025
Minister for Health	Gan Kim Yong	Gan Kim Yong	21 May 2011 – 14 May 2021
Minister for Transport	Lui Tuck Yew	Lui Tuck Yew	21 May 2011 – 30 September 2015
Minister in the Prime Minister's Office	S. Iswaran	S. Iswaran	21 May 2011 – 30 September 2015
Second Minister for Home Affairs	S. Iswaran	S. Iswaran	21 May 2011 – 30 September 2015
Second Minister for Trade and Industry	S. Iswaran	S. Iswaran	21 May 2011 – 30 September 2015
Minister for Education	Heng Swee Keat	Heng Swee Keat	21 May 2011 – 30 September 2015
Minister in the Prime Minister's Office	Grace Fu	Grace Fu	1 August 2012 – 30 September 2015
Second Minister for the Environment and Water Resources	Grace Fu	Grace Fu	1 August 2012 – 30 September 2015
Second Minister for Foreign Affairs	Grace Fu	Grace Fu	1 August 2012 – 30 September 2015
Minister for Social and Family Development	Chan Chun Sing	Chan Chun Sing	1 September 2013 – 8 April 2015
Second Minister for Defence	Chan Chun Sing	Chan Chun Sing	1 September 2013 – 8 April 2015
Acting Minister for Manpower		Tan Chuan-Jin	1 August 2012 – 30 April 2014
Acting Minister for Culture, Community and Youth	Lawrence Wong	Lawrence Wong	1 November 2012 – 30 April 2014

=== May 2014 – April 2015 ===
Changes to the Cabinet and other appointments were announced by Prime Minister Lee Hsien Loong on 29 April 2014. With effect from 1 May, Tan Chuan-Jin and Lawrence Wong were promoted to full ministers of the Ministry of Manpower and Ministry of Culture, Community and Youth respectively. Tan relinquished his appointment as Senior Minister of State in the Ministry of National Development.

Portfolio	Portrait	Name	Term
Prime Minister	Lee Hsien Loong	Lee Hsien Loong	12 August 2004 – 15 May 2024
Deputy Prime Minister	Teo Chee Hean	Teo Chee Hean	1 April 2009 – 30 April 2019
Coordinating Minister for National Security	Teo Chee Hean	Teo Chee Hean	21 May 2011 – 22 May 2025
Minister for Home Affairs	Teo Chee Hean	Teo Chee Hean	21 May 2011 – 30 September 2015
Deputy Prime Minister	Tharman Shanmugaratnam	Tharman Shanmugaratnam	21 May 2011 – 30 April 2019
Minister for Finance	Tharman Shanmugaratnam	Tharman Shanmugaratnam	1 December 2007 – 30 September 2015
Minister for Trade and Industry	Lim Hng Kiang	Lim Hng Kiang	12 August 2004 – 30 September 2015
Minister in the Prime Minister's Office	Lim Swee Say	Lim Swee Say	12 August 2004 – 3 May 2015
Minister for Communications and Information	Yaacob Ibrahim	Yaacob Ibrahim	1 November 2012 – 30 April 2018
Minister-in-charge of Muslim Affairs	Yaacob Ibrahim	Yaacob Ibrahim	25 March 2002 – 30 April 2018
Minister for National Development	Khaw Boon Wan	Khaw Boon Wan	21 May 2011 – 30 September 2015
Minister for Defence	Ng Eng Hen	Ng Eng Hen	21 May 2011 – 22 May 2025
Minister for the Environment and Water Resources	Vivian Balakrishnan	Vivian Balakrishnan	21 May 2011 – 30 September 2015
Minister for Foreign Affairs	K. Shanmugam	K. Shanmugam	21 May 2011 – 30 September 2015
Minister for Law	K. Shanmugam	K. Shanmugam	1 May 2008 – 22 May 2025
Minister for Health	Gan Kim Yong	Gan Kim Yong	21 May 2011 – 14 May 2021
Minister for Transport	Lui Tuck Yew	Lui Tuck Yew	21 May 2011 – 30 September 2015
Minister in the Prime Minister's Office	S. Iswaran	S. Iswaran	21 May 2011 – 30 September 2015
Second Minister for Home Affairs	S. Iswaran	S. Iswaran	21 May 2011 – 30 September 2015
Second Minister for Trade and Industry	S. Iswaran	S. Iswaran	21 May 2011 – 30 September 2015
Minister for Education	Heng Swee Keat	Heng Swee Keat	21 May 2011 – 30 September 2015
Minister in the Prime Minister's Office	Grace Fu	Grace Fu	1 August 2012 – 30 September 2015
Second Minister for the Environment and Water Resources	Grace Fu	Grace Fu	1 August 2012 – 30 September 2015
Second Minister for Foreign Affairs	Grace Fu	Grace Fu	1 August 2012 – 30 September 2015
Minister for Social and Family Development	Chan Chun Sing	Chan Chun Sing	1 September 2013 – 8 April 2015
Second Minister for Defence	Chan Chun Sing	Chan Chun Sing	1 September 2013 – 8 April 2015
Minister for Manpower		Tan Chuan-Jin	1 May 2014 – 3 May 2015
Minister for Culture, Community and Youth	Lawrence Wong	Lawrence Wong	1 May 2014 – 30 September 2015
Second Minister for Communications and Information	Lawrence Wong	Lawrence Wong	1 May 2014 – 30 September 2015

=== April – September 2015 ===
Changes to the Cabinet and other appointments were announced on 8 April 2015. With effect from 9 April, Chan Chun Sing relinquished his posts of Minister for Social and Family Development and Second Minister for Defence to become a Minister in the Prime Minister's Office. Tan Chuan-Jin became Minister for Social and Family Development and will relinquish his post of Minister for Manpower on 4 May. Lim Swee Say will take over as Manpower Minister on that date. Lui Tuck Yew, currently Minister for Transport, took on the additional post of Second Minister for Defence as of 9 April. Masagos Zulkifli was promoted to full minister as a Minister in the Prime Minister's Office. This is the first time there are two Malay full ministers in the Cabinet, the other being Yaacob Ibrahim.

Portfolio	Portrait	Name	Term
Prime Minister	Lee Hsien Loong	Lee Hsien Loong	12 August 2004 – 15 May 2024
Deputy Prime Minister	Teo Chee Hean	Teo Chee Hean	1 April 2009 – 30 April 2019
Coordinating Minister for National Security	Teo Chee Hean	Teo Chee Hean	21 May 2011 – 22 May 2025
Minister for Home Affairs	Teo Chee Hean	Teo Chee Hean	21 May 2011 – 30 September 2015
Deputy Prime Minister	Tharman Shanmugaratnam	Tharman Shanmugaratnam	21 May 2011 – 30 April 2019
Minister for Finance	Tharman Shanmugaratnam	Tharman Shanmugaratnam	1 December 2007 – 30 September 2015
Minister for Trade and Industry	Lim Hng Kiang	Lim Hng Kiang	12 August 2004 – 30 September 2015
Minister in the Prime Minister's Office	Lim Swee Say	Lim Swee Say	12 August 2004 – 3 May 2015
Minister for Manpower	Lim Swee Say	Lim Swee Say	4 May 2015 – 30 April 2018
Minister for Communications and Information	Yaacob Ibrahim	Yaacob Ibrahim	1 November 2012 – 30 April 2018
Minister-in-charge of Muslim Affairs	Yaacob Ibrahim	Yaacob Ibrahim	25 March 2002 – 30 April 2018
Minister for National Development	Khaw Boon Wan	Khaw Boon Wan	21 May 2011 – 30 September 2015
Minister for Defence	Ng Eng Hen	Ng Eng Hen	21 May 2011 – 22 May 2025
Minister for the Environment and Water Resources	Vivian Balakrishnan	Vivian Balakrishnan	21 May 2011 – 30 September 2015
Minister for Foreign Affairs	K. Shanmugam	K. Shanmugam	21 May 2011 – 30 September 2015
Minister for Law	K. Shanmugam	K. Shanmugam	1 May 2008 – 22 May 2025
Minister for Health	Gan Kim Yong	Gan Kim Yong	21 May 2011 – 14 May 2021
Minister for Transport	Lui Tuck Yew	Lui Tuck Yew	21 May 2011 – 30 September 2015
Second Minister for Defence	Lui Tuck Yew	Lui Tuck Yew	9 April 2015 – 30 September 2015
Minister in the Prime Minister's Office	S. Iswaran	S. Iswaran	21 May 2011 – 30 September 2015
Second Minister for Home Affairs	S. Iswaran	S. Iswaran	21 May 2011 – 30 September 2015
Second Minister for Trade and Industry	S. Iswaran	S. Iswaran	21 May 2011 – 30 September 2015
Minister for Education	Heng Swee Keat	Heng Swee Keat	21 May 2011 – 30 September 2015
Minister in the Prime Minister's Office	Grace Fu	Grace Fu	1 August 2012 – 30 September 2015
Second Minister for the Environment and Water Resources	Grace Fu	Grace Fu	1 August 2012 – 30 September 2015
Second Minister for Foreign Affairs	Grace Fu	Grace Fu	1 August 2012 – 30 September 2015
Minister in the Prime Minister's Office	Chan Chun Sing	Chan Chun Sing	9 April 2015 – 30 April 2018
Minister for Manpower		Tan Chuan-Jin	1 May 2014 – 3 May 2015
Minister for Social and Family Development		Tan Chuan-Jin	9 April 2015 – 10 September 2017
Minister for Culture, Community and Youth	Lawrence Wong	Lawrence Wong	1 May 2014 – 30 September 2015
Second Minister for Communications and Information	Lawrence Wong	Lawrence Wong	1 May 2014 – 30 September 2015
Minister in the Prime Minister's Office	Masagos Zulkifli	Masagos Zulkifli	9 April 2015 – 30 September 2015
Second Minister for Home Affairs	Masagos Zulkifli	Masagos Zulkifli	9 April 2015 – 30 September 2015
Second Minister for Foreign Affairs	Masagos Zulkifli	Masagos Zulkifli	9 April 2015 – 30 September 2015

== List of office holders ==
The following is the list of office holders in the Third Lee Hsien Loong Cabinet. Cabinet members are listed in bold.

Prime Minister's Office
Office	Name	Term start	Term end
Prime Minister	**Lee Hsien Loong**	21 May 2011	30 September 2015
Deputy Prime Minister	**Teo Chee Hean**	21 May 2011	30 September 2015
Deputy Prime Minister	**Tharman Shanmugaratnam**	21 May 2011	30 September 2015
Coordinating Minister for National Security	**Teo Chee Hean**	21 May 2011	30 September 2015
Minister in the Prime Minister's Office	**Lim Swee Say**	21 May 2011	3 May 2015
Minister in the Prime Minister's Office	**S. Iswaran**	21 May 2011	30 September 2015
Minister in the Prime Minister's Office	**Grace Fu**	1 August 2012	30 September 2015
Minister in the Prime Minister's Office	**Chan Chun Sing**	9 April 2015	30 September 2015
Minister in the Prime Minister's Office	**Masagos Zulkifli**	9 April 2015	30 September 2015
Senior Minister of State in the Prime Minister's Office	Heng Chee How	21 May 2011	30 September 2015
Minister of State in the Prime Minister's Office	Sam Tan	1 May 2014	30 September 2015
Ministry of Communications and Information (from 1 November 2012)
Office	Name	Term start	Term end
Minister for Communications and Information	**Yaacob Ibrahim (Note: Yaacob Ibrahim was concurrently the Minister-in-charge of Muslim Affairs.)**	1 November 2012	30 September 2015
Second Minister for Communications and Information	**Lawrence Wong**	1 May 2014	30 September 2015
Senior Minister of State for Communications and Information	Lawrence Wong	1 November 2012	30 April 2014
Minister of State for Communications and Information	Sim Ann	1 September 2013	30 September 2015
Senior Parliamentary Secretary for Communications and Information	Sim Ann	1 November 2012	31 August 2013
Ministry of Community Development, Youth and Sports (until 31 October 2012)
Office	Name	Term start	Term end
Minister for Community Development, Youth and Sports	**Chan Chun Sing** (Note: In an acting capacity.)	21 May 2011	31 October 2012
Minister of State for Community Development, Youth and Sports	Halimah Yacob	21 May 2011	31 October 2012
Senior Parliamentary Secretary for Community Development, Youth and Sports	Sam Tan	21 May 2011	31 October 2012
Ministry of Culture, Community and Youth (from 1 November 2012)
Office	Name	Term start	Term end
Minister for Culture, Community and Youth	**Lawrence Wong** (Note: In an acting capacity until 30 April 2014.)	1 November 2012	30 September 2015
Minister of State for Culture, Community and Youth	Halimah Yacob	1 November 2012	13 January 2013
Minister of State for Culture, Community and Youth	Sam Tan	1 May 2014	30 September 2015
Senior Parliamentary Secretary for Culture, Community and Youth	Sam Tan	1 November 2012	30 April 2014
Parliamentary Secretary for Culture, Community and Youth	Low Yen Ling	1 May 2014	30 September 2015
Ministry of Defence
Office	Name	Term start	Term end
Minister for Defence	**Ng Eng Hen**	21 May 2011	30 September 2015
Second Minister for Defence	**Chan Chun Sing**	1 September 2013	8 April 2015
Second Minister for Defence	**Lui Tuck Yew**	9 April 2015	30 September 2015
Senior Minister of State for Defence	Chan Chun Sing	1 August 2012	31 August 2013
Minister of State for Defence	Lawrence Wong	21 May 2011	31 July 2012
Minister of State for Defence	Maliki Osman	1 September 2013	30 September 2015
Senior Parliamentary Secretary for Defence	Maliki Osman	21 May 2011	31 August 2013
Ministry of Education
Office	Name	Term start	Term end
Minister for Education	**Heng Swee Keat**	21 May 2011	30 September 2015
Senior Minister of State for Education	Lawrence Wong	1 August 2012	31 October 2012
Senior Minister of State for Education	Indranee Rajah	1 November 2012	30 September 2015
Minister of State for Education	Lawrence Wong	21 May 2011	31 July 2012
Minister of State for Education	Sim Ann	1 September 2013	30 September 2015
Senior Parliamentary Secretary for Education	Hawazi Daipi	21 May 2011	30 September 2015
Senior Parliamentary Secretary for Education	Sim Ann	21 May 2011	31 August 2013
Ministry of the Environment and Water Resources
Office	Name	Term start	Term end
Minister for the Environment and Water Resources	**Vivian Balakrishnan**	21 May 2011	30 September 2015
Second Minister for the Environment and Water Resources	**Grace Fu**	1 August 2012	30 September 2015
Senior Minister of State for the Environment	Grace Fu	21 May 2011	31 July 2012
Ministry of Finance
Office	Name	Term start	Term end
Minister for Finance	**Tharman Shanmugaratnam**	21 May 2011	30 September 2015
Senior Minister of State for Finance	Josephine Teo	1 September 2013	30 September 2015
Minister of State for Finance	Josephine Teo	21 May 2011	31 August 2013
Ministry of Foreign Affairs
Office	Name	Term start	Term end
Minister for Foreign Affairs	**K. Shanmugam**	21 May 2011	30 September 2015
Second Minister for Foreign Affairs	**Lui Tuck Yew**	21 May 2011	31 July 2012
Second Minister for Foreign Affairs	**Grace Fu**	1 August 2012	30 September 2015
Second Minister for Foreign Affairs	**Masagos Zulkifli**	9 April 2015	30 September 2015
Senior Minister of State for Foreign Affairs	Masagos Zulkifli	1 August 2012	8 April 2015
Minister of State for Foreign Affairs	Masagos Zulkifli	21 May 2011	31 July 2012
Senior Parliamentary Secretary for Foreign Affairs	Sam Tan	21 May 2011	30 April 2014
Ministry of Health
Office	Name	Term start	Term end
Minister for Health	**Gan Kim Yong**	21 May 2011	30 September 2015
Senior Minister of State for Health	Amy Khor	1 September 2013	30 September 2015
Minister of State for Health	Amy Khor	21 May 2011	31 August 2013
Minister of State for Health	Lam Pin Min	1 August 2014	30 September 2015
Parliamentary Secretary for Health	Faishal Ibrahim	1 August 2012	30 September 2015
Ministry of Home Affairs
Office	Name	Term start	Term end
Minister for Home Affairs	**Teo Chee Hean**	21 May 2011	30 September 2015
Second Minister for Home Affairs	**S. Iswaran**	21 May 2011	30 September 2015
Second Minister for Home Affairs	**Masagos Zulkifli**	9 April 2015	30 September 2015
Senior Minister of State for Home Affairs	Masagos Zulkifli	1 August 2012	8 April 2015
Minister of State for Home Affairs	Masagos Zulkifli	21 May 2011	31 July 2012
Minister for Information, Communications and the Arts (until 31 October 2012)
Office	Name	Term start	Term end
Minister for Information, Communications and the Arts	**Yaacob Ibrahim**	21 May 2011	31 October 2012
Senior Minister of State for Information, Communications and the Arts	Grace Fu	21 May 2011	31 July 2012
Senior Minister of State for Information, Communications and the Arts	Lawrence Wong	1 August 2012	31 October 2012
Minister of State for Information, Communications and the Arts	Chan Chun Sing	21 May 2011	31 July 2012
Ministry of Law
Office	Name	Term start	Term end
Minister for Law	**K. Shanmugam**	21 May 2011	30 September 2015
Senior Minister of State for Law	Indranee Rajah	1 November 2012	30 September 2015
Senior Parliamentary Secretary for Law	Sim Ann	21 May 2011	31 October 2012
Minister for Manpower
Office	Name	Term start	Term end
Minister for Manpower	**Tharman Shanmugaratnam**	21 May 2011	31 July 2012
Minister for Manpower	**Tan Chuan-Jin**	1 August 2012	3 May 2015
Minister for Manpower	**Lim Swee Say**	4 May 2015	30 September 2015
Senior Minister of State for Manpower	Amy Khor	1 September 2013	30 September 2015
Minister of State for Manpower	Tan Chuan-Jin	21 May 2011	31 July 2012
Minister of State for Manpower	Amy Khor	1 August 2012	31 August 2013
Senior Parliamentary Secretary for Manpower	Hawazi Daipi	21 May 2011	30 September 2015
Ministry of National Development
Office	Name	Term start	Term end
Minister for National Development	**Khaw Boon Wan**	21 May 2011	30 September 2015
Senior Minister of State for National Development	Tan Chuan-Jin	1 August 2012	31 August 2013
Senior Minister of State for National Development	Lee Yi Shyan	1 August 2012	30 September 2015
Minister of State for National Development	Lee Yi Shyan	21 May 2011	31 July 2012
Minister of State for National Development	Tan Chuan-Jin	21 May 2011	31 July 2012
Minister of State for National Development	Maliki Osman	1 September 2013	30 September 2015
Minister of State for National Development	Desmond Lee	1 September 2013	30 September 2015
Senior Parliamentary Secretary for National Development	Maliki Osman	21 May 2011	31 August 2013
Minister for Social and Family Development (from 1 November 2012)
Office	Name	Term start	Term end
Minister for Social and Family Development	**Chan Chun Sing** (Note: In an acting capacity until 31 August 2013.)	1 November 2012	30 September 2015
Minister of State for Social and Family Development	Halimah Yacob	1 November 2012	13 January 2013
Parliamentary Secretary for Social and Family Development	Low Yen Ling	1 October 2013	30 September 2015
Ministry of Trade and Industry
Office	Name	Term start	Term end
Minister for Trade and Industry	**Lim Hng Kiang**	21 May 2011	30 September 2015
Second Minister for Trade and Industry	**S. Iswaran**	21 May 2011	30 September 2015
Senior Minister of State for Trade and Industry	Lee Yi Shyan	1 August 2012	30 September 2015
Minister of State for Trade and Industry	Lee Yi Shyan	21 May 2011	31 July 2012
Minister of State for Trade and Industry	Teo Ser Luck	21 May 2011	30 September 2015
Ministry of Transport
Office	Name	Term start	Term end
Minister for Transport	**Lui Tuck Yew**	21 May 2011	30 September 2015
Senior Minister of State for Transport	Josephine Teo	1 September 2013	30 September 2015
Minister of State for Transport	Josephine Teo	21 May 2011	31 August 2013
Parliamentary Secretary for Transport	Faishal Ibrahim	1 August 2012	30 September 2015
