= Ministry of Education (Singapore) =

Government ministry of Singapore

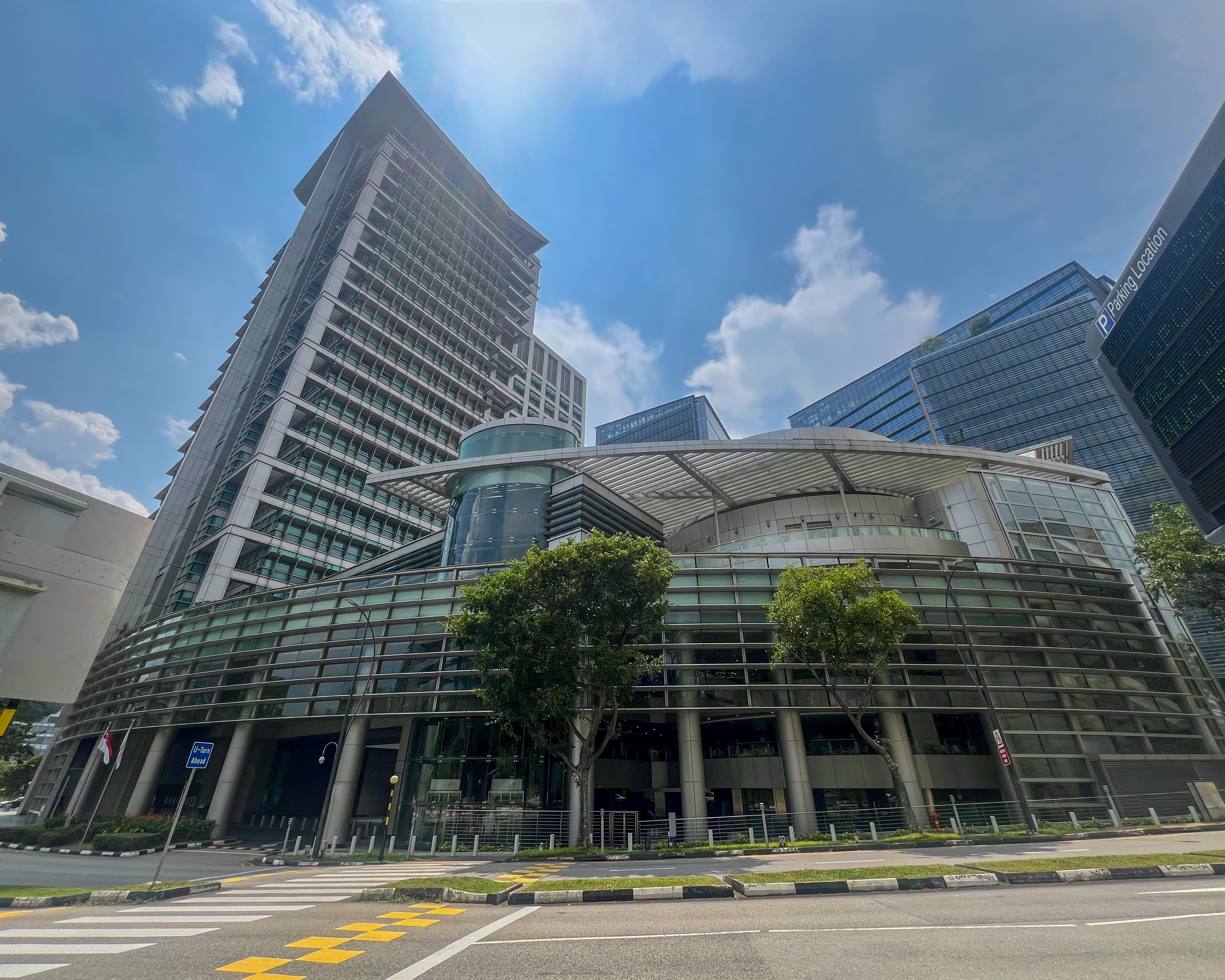
- Headquarters of the Ministry

Agency overview
- Formed: 7 April 1955; 71 years ago
- Jurisdiction: Government of Singapore
- Headquarters: Singapore
- Motto: Moulding the future of our nation
- Employees: 62,964
- Annual budget: ▲ S$13.20 billion (2019)
- Ministers responsible: Desmond Lee, Minister; David Neo, Second Minister; Janil Puthucheary, Senior Minister of State; Shawn Loh, Minister of State (wef from January 1 2027); Syed Harun Alhabsyi, Senior Parliamentary Secretary
- Agency executives: Lim Wan Yong, Permanent Secretary; Kenneth Er Boon Hwee, Second Permanent Secretary; Liew Wei Li, Director-General of Education (Professional); Eugene Leong, Deputy Secretary (Policy); James Wong, Deputy Secretary (Services); Chong Yiun Lin, Deputy Secretary (Higher Education and Skills); Beatrice Chong, Deputy Director-General of Education (Professional Development); Tan Chen Kee, Deputy Director-General of Education (Schools) and Director of Schools; Sng Chern Wei, Deputy Director-General of Education (Curriculum); Singapore
- Child agencies: Skills and Workforce Development Agency; Singapore Examinations and Assessment Board; ISEAS–Yusof Ishak Institute; Institute of Technical Education; Singapore Polytechnic; Ngee Ann Polytechnic; Temasek Polytechnic; Nanyang Polytechnic; Republic Polytechnic; Science Centre Singapore
- Website: moe.gov.sg
- Agency ID: T08GA0012J

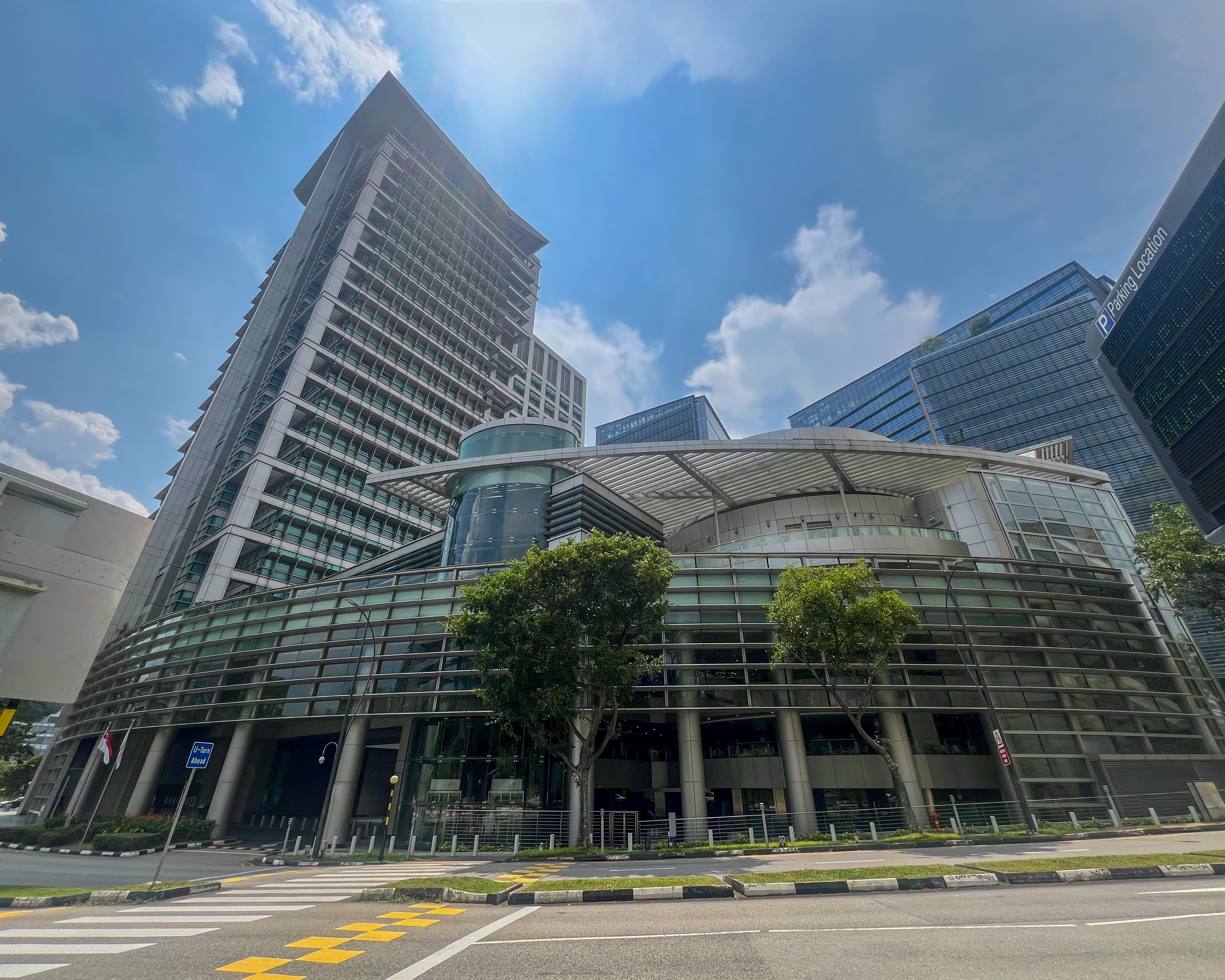
Ministry of Education headquarters at Buona Vista

The Ministry of Education (MOE; Malay: Kementerian Pendidikan; Chinese: 教育部; Tamil: கல்வி அமைச்சு) is a ministry of the Government of Singapore responsible for the formulation and implementation of policies related to the education in Singapore.

== Organisational structure ==
The ministry currently oversees 10 statutory boards which includes 5 polytechnics and 2 institutes: SkillsFuture Singapore, Singapore Examinations and Assessment Board, ISEAS–Yusof Ishak Institute, Institute of Technical Education, Singapore Polytechnic, Ngee Ann Polytechnic, Temasek Polytechnic, Nanyang Polytechnic, Republic Polytechnic and Science Centre, Singapore.

In 2016, a new statutory board under the Ministry of Education (MOE), SkillsFuture Singapore (SSG), was formed to drive and coordinate the implementation of SkillsFuture. It took over some of the functions currently performed by the Singapore Workforce Development Agency (WDA) and absorbed the Committee for Private Education (CPE).

=== Unions ===
Civil servants employed by the Ministry of Education are organised into several Unions, including the Singapore Teachers' Union, Singapore Chinese Teachers' Union, Singapore Malay Teachers' Union and Singapore Tamil Teachers' Union for Education Officers; and the Amalgamated Union of Public Employees for the non-Education Officers. All these unions are affiliates of the National Trades Union Congress.

=== Statutory boards ===
- SkillsFuture Singapore
- Singapore Examinations and Assessment Board
- ISEAS–Yusof Ishak Institute
- Institute of Technical Education
- Singapore Polytechnic
- Ngee Ann Polytechnic
- Temasek Polytechnic
- Nanyang Polytechnic
- Republic Polytechnic
- Science Centre, Singapore

== Impact ==
The Government of Singapore invests heavily in education to equip citizens with the necessary knowledge and skills to compete in the global marketplace. Singapore currently spends around a fifth of its national budget on education. To boost its economic standing, the Government of Singapore created a mandate that most Singaporeans learn English. It is the language of governance and administration in Singapore and English is also the medium of instruction in most, if not all, schools in Singapore. As a result, the country rose from one of the most impoverished Asian countries to one with the strongest economies and highest standards of living.

=== SkillsFuture ===
The SkillsFuture initiative was introduced in 2015 to support Singapore's next stage of economic advancement by providing lifelong learning and skills development opportunities for Singaporeans. SkillsFuture aims at unlocking the full potential of all Singaporeans, regardless of background and industry. The program contains several key initiatives, such as SkillsFuture Credit and SkillsFuture Earn and Learn. SkillsFuture caters to many stakeholders, with initiatives centred on students, adult learners, employers, and training providers. In general, SkillsFuture involves a broad array of policy instruments targeting a wider range of beneficiaries over a longer-term horizon – schooling years, early career, mid-career or silver years – with a variety of resources available to help them attain mastery of skills.

Every Singapore citizen from the age of 25 is given S$500 (approximately $370) by the Singapore government for the SkillsFuture Credit to invest in their personal learning. This sum can be used for continuing education courses in local tertiary institutions, as well as short courses provided by MOOC providers such as Udemy, Coursera, and edX.

By the end of 2017, the SkillsFuture Credit has been utilised by over 285,000 Singaporeans. There were more than 18,000 SkillsFuture credit-approved courses available at that time. As of 2016, there were also a total of 40 Earn and Learn Programmes.

SkillsFuture has established a multi-level training system with dozens of initiatives and programs targeting the different skill-training needs of different social groups, such as students and employees in different career stages. Moreover, SkillsFuture also invests in forms of industry collaboration to uplift the broad base of private companies, and strengthen collaboration between training institutions, unions, trade associations, and employers to develop the skills of the Singaporean workforce. In terms of funding, according to the Singaporean government budget report, a provision of $220 million has been made for SSG in the fiscal year 2018 to implement plans, policies and strategies to support skills development programs under SkillsFuture.

== Ministers ==
With the expanding scope of education in Singapore and the implementation of SkillsFuture in 2016, the Ministry was led by two ministers; Minister for Education (Schools), who oversees the pre-school, primary, secondary, and junior college education; and Minister for Education (Higher Education and Skills), who oversees the ITE, polytechnic, university and SkillsFuture education. In 2018, the Ministry returned to being headed by one minister.

The Ministry is headed by the Minister for Education, who is appointed as part of the Cabinet of Singapore. The incubment Minister is Desmond Lee, an MP of West Coast-Jurong West GRC from the People's Action Party.

=== Minister for Education (1955–2015) ===
Minister		Took office	Left office	Party	Cabinet
	Chew Swee Kee; MP for Whampoa (1918–1985)	6 April 1955	4 March 1959	LF	Marshall
	Chew Swee Kee; MP for Whampoa (1918–1985)	6 April 1955	4 March 1959	LF	Lim
	Lim Yew Hock; MP for Havelock (1914–1984)	5 March 1959	3 June 1959	SPA	Lim
	Yong Nyuk Lin; MP for Geylang West (1918–2012)	5 June 1959	18 October 1963	PAP	Lee K. I
	Ong Pang Boon; MP for Telok Ayer (born 1929)	19 October 1963	10 August 1970	PAP	Lee K. II
	Ong Pang Boon; MP for Telok Ayer (born 1929)	19 October 1963	10 August 1970	PAP	Lee K. III
	Lim Kim San; MP for Cairnhill (1916–2006)	11 August 1970	15 September 1972	PAP	Lee K. III
	Lee Chiaw Meng; MP for Farrer Park (1937–2001)	16 September 1972	1 June 1975	PAP	Lee K. IV
	Toh Chin Chye; MP for Rochore (1921–2012)	2 June 1975	14 June 1975	PAP	Lee K. IV
Lee Kuan Yew in 1965	Lee Kuan Yew; MP for Tanjong Pagar (1923–2015)	15 June 1975	19 October 1975	PAP	Lee K. IV
	Chua Sian Chin; MP for MacPherson (1933–2014)	20 October 1975	11 February 1979	PAP	Lee K. IV
	Chua Sian Chin; MP for MacPherson (1933–2014)	20 October 1975	11 February 1979	PAP	Lee K. V
	Goh Keng Swee; MP for Kreta Ayer (1918–2010)	12 February 1979	31 May 1980	PAP	Lee K. V
	Tony Tan; MP for Sembawang (born 1940)	1 June 1980	31 May 1981	PAP	Lee K. V
	Tony Tan; MP for Sembawang (born 1940)	1 June 1980	31 May 1981	PAP	Lee K. VI
	Goh Keng Swee; MP for Kreta Ayer (1918–2010)	1 June 1981	1 January 1985	PAP	Lee K. VI
	Tony Tan; MP for Sembawang (until 1988) and Sembawang GRC (from 1988) (born 1940)	2 January 1985	1 January 1992	PAP	Lee K. VII
	Tony Tan; MP for Sembawang (until 1988) and Sembawang GRC (from 1988) (born 1940)	2 January 1985	1 January 1992	PAP	Lee K. VIII
	Tony Tan; MP for Sembawang (until 1988) and Sembawang GRC (from 1988) (born 1940)	2 January 1985	1 January 1992	PAP	Goh I
	Tony Tan; MP for Sembawang (until 1988) and Sembawang GRC (from 1988) (born 1940)	2 January 1985	1 January 1992	PAP	Goh II
	Lee Yock Suan; MP for Cheng San GRC (born 1946)	2 January 1992	24 January 1997	PAP	Goh II
	Teo Chee Hean; MP for Pasir Ris GRC (until 2001) and Pasir Ris–Punggol GRC (from 2001) (born 1954)	25 January 1997	31 July 2003	PAP	Goh III
	Teo Chee Hean; MP for Pasir Ris GRC (until 2001) and Pasir Ris–Punggol GRC (from 2001) (born 1954)	25 January 1997	31 July 2003	PAP	Goh IV
	Tharman Shanmugaratnam (Note: Tharman Shanmugaratnam served as acting minister from 1 August 2003 until 11 August 2004.); MP for Jurong GRC (born 1957)	1 August 2003	11 August 2004	PAP	Goh IV
	Tharman Shanmugaratnam; MP for Jurong GRC (born 1957)	12 August 2004	31 March 2008	PAP	Lee H. I
	Tharman Shanmugaratnam; MP for Jurong GRC (born 1957)	12 August 2004	31 March 2008	PAP	Lee H. II
	Ng Eng Hen; MP for Bishan–Toa Payoh GRC (born 1958)	1 April 2008	20 May 2011	PAP	Lee H. II
	Heng Swee Keat; MP for Tampines GRC (born 1961)	21 May 2011	30 September 2015	PAP	Lee H. III

=== Minister for Education (Schools) (2015–2018) ===
Minister	Took office	Left office	Party	Cabinet
Ng Chee Meng (Note: Ng Chee Meng served as acting minister from 1 October 2015 until 31 October 2016.); MP for Pasir Ris–Punggol GRC (born 1968)	1 October 2015	31 October 2016	PAP	Lee H. IV
Ng Chee Meng; MP for Pasir Ris–Punggol GRC (born 1968)	1 November 2016	30 April 2018	PAP	Lee H. IV

=== Minister for Education (Higher Education and Skills) (2015–2018) ===
Minister	Took office	Left office	Party	Cabinet
Ong Ye Kung (Note: Ong Ye Kung served as acting minister from 1 October 2015 until 31 October 2016.); MP for Sembawang GRC (born 1969)	1 October 2015	31 October 2016	PAP	Lee H. IV
Ong Ye Kung; MP for Sembawang GRC (born 1969)	1 November 2016	30 April 2018	PAP	Lee H. IV

=== Minister for Education (2018–present) ===
Minister	Took office	Left office	Party	Cabinet
Ong Ye Kung; MP for Sembawang GRC (born 1969)	1 May 2018	26 July 2020	PAP	Lee H. IV
Lawrence Wong; MP for Marsiling–Yew Tee GRC (born 1972)	27 July 2020	14 May 2021	PAP	Lee H. V
Chan Chun Sing; MP for Tanjong Pagar GRC (born 1969)	15 May 2021	22 May 2025	PAP	Lee H. V
Chan Chun Sing; MP for Tanjong Pagar GRC (born 1969)	15 May 2021	22 May 2025	PAP	Wong I
Desmond Lee; MP for West Coast–Jurong West GRC (born 1976)	23 May 2025	Incumbent	PAP	Wong II

== See also ==
- Education in Singapore
- Curriculum Development Institute of Singapore
