= Leng Kee Single Member Constituency =

Historical constituency in Singapore

Coordinates: 1.291°N 103.808°E

Leng Kee
- Former single member constituency
- Region: Central Region, Singapore

Former constituency
- Created: 1972
- Abolished: 1997
- Local council: Redhill
- Created from: Bukit Merah Constituency
- Replaced by: Tanjong Pagar Group Representation Constituency

Leng Kee Single Member Constituency was a constituency in Singapore. In 1972, Leng Kee Constituency was formed by carving out from Bukit Merah Constituency. In 1988, it was renamed as Leng Kee Single Member Constituency (SMC) as part of Singapore's political reforms. The SMC was merged into Tanjong Pagar Group Representation Constituency in 1997.

== Member of Parliament ==
Election	Member of Parliament	Party
1972	Ahmad Mattar	PAP
1976	Ow Chin Hock	PAP
1980	Ow Chin Hock	PAP
1984	Ow Chin Hock	PAP
1988	Ow Chin Hock	PAP
1991	Ow Chin Hock	PAP

== Electoral results ==
Note: The Elections Department does not include rejected votes when calculating the vote shares of candidates. Hence, all candidates' vote shares will total to 100% at any given election (may not appear so in multi-way contests due to rounding).

=== Elections in 1970s ===
General Election 1972: Leng Kee
Party	Candidate	Votes	%
PAP	Ahmad Mattar	10,929	68.28
WP	Ng Ho	4,036	25.21
UNF	N. Logam	1,042	6.51
Majority		6,893	43.07
Registered electors		17,158	
PAP win (new seat)			
