= Ahmad Mattar =

Former Singaporean politician

- أحمد مطر

Minister for the Environment
- In office 2 January 1985 – 30 June 1993
- Prime Minister: Lee Kuan Yew; Goh Chok Tong
- Preceded by: Ong Pang Boon
- Succeeded by: Mah Bow Tan

Minister-in-charge of Muslim Affairs
- In office 5 September 1977 – 30 June 1993
- Prime Minister: Lee Kuan Yew; Goh Chok Tong
- Preceded by: Office established
- Succeeded by: Abdullah Tarmugi

Member of the Singapore Parliament for Brickworks GRC
- In office 3 September 1988 – 16 December 1996
- Preceded by: Constituency established
- Succeeded by: Constituency abolished
- Majority: 1988: 13,893 (34.86%); 1991: N/A (walkover)

Member of the Singapore Parliament for Brickworks
- In office 23 December 1976 – 17 August 1988
- Preceded by: Constituency established
- Succeeded by: Constituency abolished
- Majority: 1976: 6,401 (47.98%); 1980: N/A (walkover); 1984: 4,119 (32.54%)

Member of the Singapore Parliament for Leng Kee
- In office 2 September 1972 – 6 December 1976
- Preceded by: Constituency established
- Succeeded by: Ow Chin Hock
- Majority: 6,893 (43.07%)

Personal details
- Born: Ahmad bin Mohamed Mattar; 13 August 1940 (age 86) Singapore, Straits Settlements
- Party: People's Action Party (1972–1996)
- Education: University of Singapore (BSc; DSc); University of Sheffield (MSc)
- Occupation: Politician
- Profession: Academic

Ahmad bin Mohamed Mattar (Note: Jawi: أحمد بن محمد مطر) (born 13 August 1940) is a former Singaporean politician and academic who served as the inaugural Minister-in-charge of Muslim Affairs from 1977 and 1993 and Minister for the Environment from 1985 to 1993. A former member of the governing People's Action Party (PAP), he was the Member of Parliament (MP) for Leng Kee Constituency between 1972 and 1976, Brickworks Constituency between 1976 and 1988 and the Brickworks division of Brickworks Group Representation Constituency (GRC) between 1988 and 1996.

== Early life and education ==
Born in 1940 to an Arab Singaporean family, Mattar studied at Raffles Institution (RI) before graduating from the University of Singapore (now the National University of Singapore) with a Bachelor of Science (BSc) in physics in 1963. He later obtained his Master of Science (MSc) at the University of Sheffield on a Colombo Plan scholarship and earned his Doctor of Science (DSc) at the University of Singapore.

== Career ==
Prior to entering politics, Mattar was a lecturer at Singapore Polytechnic (SP) and conducted the first large-scale study on the effects of traffic noise on housing estates in Singapore; the study would later inform future legislations and studies on traffic noise. In 1982, he founded Mendaki, an organisation established to look into the educational and welfare needs of the Singaporean Malay–Muslim community, and served as its president until 1989.

=== Political career ===
During the early 1970s, Mattar was recruited by the PAP. On the recommendation of Abdul Rahim Ishak, incumbent MP for Siglap Constituency and younger brother of Yusof Ishak, the inaugural President of Singapore, he stood in Leng Kee Constituency during the 1972 general election and won. From 1977 to 1993, he served as the inaugural Minister-in-charge of Muslim Affairs, a role created to strengthen understanding and improve relations between the Singaporean Malay–Muslim community and the government.

From 1985 to 1993, he served as the Minister for the Environment in the 7th and 8th Cabinets under Prime Minister Lee Kuan Yew. During his tenure, he was noted for tightening restrictions on the sale of aerosols containing chlorofluorocarbons (CFCs), continuing the clean-up of the Singapore River and introducing the corrective work order (CWO) to combat littering through the public shaming of "litterbugs". Despite plans to resign from the Cabinet after the 1991 general election, he was persuaded by newly elected prime minister Goh Chok Tong, who succeeded Lee, to remain for a final term in his first Cabinet.

In 1993, Mattar resigned from the Cabinet; he remained a backbencher until his full retirement from politics at the 1997 general election. He has largely kept a low profile since.

== Personal life ==
Mattar is the uncle of Siti Alia Mattar, a Workers' Party (WP) candidate for Punggol GRC in the 2025 general election. The WP team lost to Gan Kim Yong and his PAP team with 44.83% of the vote.

== Notes ==
Parliament of Singapore
New constituency	Member of Parliament for Leng Kee Constituency; 1972–1976	Succeeded by Ow Chin Hock
New constituency	Member of Parliament for Brickworks Constituency; 1976–1988	Constituency abolished
New constituency	Member of Parliament for Brickworks GRC; 1988–1996; Served alongside: (1988–1991): Tan Soo Khoon, Chay Wai Chuen (1991–1997): Chay Wai Chuen, Bernard Chen, Wan Soon Bee	Constituency abolished
Political offices
New office	Minister-in-charge of Muslim Affairs; 1977–1993	Succeeded by Abdullah Tarmugi
Preceded by Ong Pang Boon	Minister for the Environment; 1985–1993	Succeeded by Mah Bow Tan
