= Ministry of Foreign Affairs (Singapore) =

Ministry of the Government of Singapore

Agency overview
- Formed: 9 August 1965; 61 years ago
- Jurisdiction: Government of Singapore
- Headquarters: 1 Sherwood Road, (Tanglin) Singapore 248163
- Motto: Establishing Our Place in the World
- Employees: 1,616 (2018)
- Annual budget: S$466.70 million (2019)
- Ministers responsible: Vivian Balakrishnan, Minister; Sim Ann, Second Minister; Gan Siow Huang, Minister of State; Zhulkarnain Abdul Rahim, Minister of State; Alvin Tan, Minister of State
- Agency executives: Albert Chua, Permanent Secretary; Luke Goh, Permanent Secretary (Development); Kevin Cheok, Deputy Secretary (Asia Pacific); Wong Hong Kuan, Deputy Secretary (Management); Foo Chi Hsia, Deputy Secretary (Southeast Asia and ASEAN)
- Website: www.mfa.gov.sg
- Agency ID: T08GA0014A

Footnotes
- List of diplomatic missions of Singapore

The Ministry of Foreign Affairs (MFA; Malay: Kementerian Ehwal Luar Negeri; Chinese: 新加坡外交部; Tamil: வெளியுறவு அமைச்சு) is in charge of the country's foreign relations, as well as handling matters and providing consular assistance related to overseas Singaporean citizens. It was established on 9 August 1965. A ministry for the Government of Singapore, it is also responsible for conducting and managing diplomatic relations between Singapore and other countries and regions.

== Organisational structure ==
The ministry now has 50 overseas missions including 7 high commissions, 21 embassies, 4 permanent missions to the United Nations, and 17 consulates. Singapore has appointed 31 honorary consuls-general/consuls abroad and has 46 non-resident ambassadors and high commissioners based in Singapore.

The ministry is currently divided into 11 directorates which deal with political and economic matters, and 7 directorates which oversee matters relating to protocol, consular issues and the Singapore Cooperation Programme (SCP) among others.

The Corporate Affairs Directorate oversees organisational and resource management while the Human Resource Directorate and Diplomatic Academy manage the development of personnel and training.

== Impact ==
Singapore maintains diplomatic relations with 188 countries. In Singapore, there are 70 resident foreign embassies and high commissions, 43 foreign consulates and 11 international organisations based in Singapore. In addition, more than 60 non-resident foreign ambassadors are accredited to Singapore.

=== 2026 Evacuation Flights ===
In March 2026, the Ministry of Foreign Affairs arranged for Singaporeans and their dependants to be repatriated back to Singapore from Muscat, Oman and Riyadh due to airspace closures after the US-Israel attack on Iran.

== Ministers ==
The Ministry is headed by the Minister for Foreign Affairs, who is appointed as part of the Cabinet of Singapore. The incumbent Minister is Vivian Balakrishnan, an MP for Holland–Bukit Timah GRC from the governing People's Action Party.

Minister	Took office	Left office	Party	Cabinet
S. Rajaratnam; MP for Kampong Glam (1915–2006)	9 August 1965	30 May 1980	PAP	Lee K. II
S. Rajaratnam; MP for Kampong Glam (1915–2006)	9 August 1965	30 May 1980	PAP	Lee K. III
S. Rajaratnam; MP for Kampong Glam (1915–2006)	9 August 1965	30 May 1980	PAP	Lee K. IV
S. Rajaratnam; MP for Kampong Glam (1915–2006)	9 August 1965	30 May 1980	PAP	Lee K. V
S. Dhanabalan; MP for Kallang (born 1937)	1 June 1980	12 September 1988	PAP	Lee K. V
S. Dhanabalan; MP for Kallang (born 1937)	1 June 1980	12 September 1988	PAP	Lee K. VI
S. Dhanabalan; MP for Kallang (born 1937)	1 June 1980	12 September 1988	PAP	Lee K. VII
Wong Kan Seng; MP for Kuo Chuan SMC (until 1991) and Thomson GRC (from 1991) (born 1946)	13 September 1988	1 January 1994	PAP	Lee K. VIII
Wong Kan Seng; MP for Kuo Chuan SMC (until 1991) and Thomson GRC (from 1991) (born 1946)	13 September 1988	1 January 1994	PAP	Goh I
Wong Kan Seng; MP for Kuo Chuan SMC (until 1991) and Thomson GRC (from 1991) (born 1946)	13 September 1988	1 January 1994	PAP	Goh II
S. Jayakumar; MP for Bedok GRC (until 1997) and East Coast GRC (from 1997) (born 1939)	2 January 1994	11 August 2004	PAP	Goh II
S. Jayakumar; MP for Bedok GRC (until 1997) and East Coast GRC (from 1997) (born 1939)	2 January 1994	11 August 2004	PAP	Goh III
S. Jayakumar; MP for Bedok GRC (until 1997) and East Coast GRC (from 1997) (born 1939)	2 January 1994	11 August 2004	PAP	Goh IV
George Yeo; MP for Aljunied GRC (born 1954)	12 August 2004	20 May 2011	PAP	Lee H. I
George Yeo; MP for Aljunied GRC (born 1954)	12 August 2004	20 May 2011	PAP	Lee H. II
K. Shanmugam; MP for Nee Soon GRC (born 1959)	21 May 2011	30 September 2015	PAP	Lee H. III
Vivian Balakrishnan; MP for Holland–Bukit Timah GRC (born 1961)	1 October 2015	Incumbent	PAP	Lee H. IV
Vivian Balakrishnan; MP for Holland–Bukit Timah GRC (born 1961)	1 October 2015	Incumbent	PAP	Lee H. V
Vivian Balakrishnan; MP for Holland–Bukit Timah GRC (born 1961)	1 October 2015	Incumbent	PAP	Wong I
Vivian Balakrishnan; MP for Holland–Bukit Timah GRC (born 1961)	1 October 2015	Incumbent	PAP	Wong II

== See also ==
- List of current foreign ministers
- Foreign relations of Singapore
- List of diplomatic missions of Singapore
