= Brickworks Constituency =

Former electoral division in Singapore

Coordinates: 1.286°N 103.804°E

Brickworks
- Former Single Member constituency for the Parliament of Singapore
- Region: Singapore

Former constituency
- Created: 1976
- Abolished: 1988
- Seats: 1
- Member: Constituency Abolished
- Replaced by: Brickworks GRC

Brickworks Constituency was a constituency in Singapore. It used to exist from 1976 to 1988. It merged part of Leng Kee and Pasir Panjang.

== History ==
In 1988, the constituency was merged into Brickworks GRC following the establishment of Group representation constituency (GRC) and Single Member Constituency (SMC).

== Member of Parliament ==
Election	Member	Party
Formation
1976	Ahmad Mattar	PAP
1980	Ahmad Mattar	PAP
1984	Ahmad Mattar	PAP
Constituency abolished (1988)

== Electoral results ==
Note: The Elections Department does not include rejected votes when calculating the vote shares of candidates. Hence, all candidates' vote shares will total to 100% at any given election (may not appear so in multi-way contests due to rounding).

=== Elections in 1970s ===
General Election 1976
Party	Candidate	Votes	%
PAP	Ahmad Mattar	9,871	73.99
United Front	Tung Tao-Chang alias Shums	3,470	26.01
Majority		47.98	6,401
Total valid votes			
Rejected ballots			
Turnout		13,341	94.87
Registered electors		14,062	
PAP win (new seat)			

=== Elections in 1980s ===
General Election 1980
Party	Candidate	Votes	%	±%
PAP	Ahmad Mattar	Unopposed		
Registered electors		13,054		▼7.17
PAP hold				

General Election 1984
Party	Candidate	Votes	%	±%
PAP	Ahmad Mattar	8,389	66.27	N/A
WP	Mohd Taib B Saffar	4,270	33.73	N/A
Majority		4,119	32.54	N/A
Total valid votes		12,659	97.75	N/A
Rejected ballots		292	2.25	N/A
Turnout		12,951	95.43	N/A
Registered electors		13,571		▲3.96
PAP hold		Swing	N/A	
