= Brickworks Group Representation Constituency =

Former electoral division in Singapore

The Brickworks Group Representation Constituency was a group representation constituency (GRC) in Singapore. It existed from 1988 to 1996.

== History ==
Brickworks GRC was created prior to the 1988 general election with three seats in Parliament; it was a merger of the constituencies of Alexandra, Brickworks and Queenstown. All constituencies with a single Member of Parliament (MP) were renamed single-member constituencies (SMCs). The team for the governing People's Action Party (PAP) defeated the Workers' Party (WP) with 67.43% of the vote.

During the 1991 general election, Brickworks GRC lost its Alexandra division while absorbing Pasir Panjang GRC; it became a four-seat GRC, as with all other GRCs at that election. Incumbent MP Tan Soo Khoon was redeployed to Bedok GRC. The PAP team won unopposed.

Prior to the 1997 general election, Brickworks GRC was dissolved; its territory was distributed between Bukit Timah, Tanjong Pagar and West Coast GRCs.

== Members of Parliament ==
| Year | Division | Members of Parliament | Party |
|---|---|---|---|
Formation
| 1988 | Alexandra; Brickworks; Queenstown | Tan Soo Khoon; Ahmad Mattar; Chay Wai Chuen | PAP |
| 1991 | Brickworks; Queenstown; Clementi; West Coast | Ahmad Mattar; Chay Wai Chuen; Bernard Chen; Wan Soon Bee | PAP |
Abolished (1997)

== Electoral results ==
Note: The Elections Department does not include rejected votes when calculating the vote shares of candidates. Hence, all candidates' vote shares will total to 100% at any given election (may not appear so in multi-way contests due to rounding).

=== Elections in 1980s ===
General Election 1988
| Party | Candidate | Votes | % |
|---|---|---|---|
| PAP | Ahmad Mattar Chay Wai Chuen Tan Soo Khoon | 26,870 | 67.43 |
| WP | Ismail Yacob Goh Teng Hoon J. C. Corera | 12,977 | 32.57 |
| Majority | | 13,893 | 34.86 |
| Total valid votes | | 39,847 | 98.25 |
| Rejected ballots | | 710 | 1.75 |
| Turnout | | 40,557 | 94.06 |
| Registered electors | | 43,117 | |
| PAP win (new seat) | | | |

=== Elections in 1990s ===
General Election 1991
| Party | Candidate | Votes | % | ±% |
|---|---|---|---|---|
| PAP | Ahmad Mattar; Chay Wai Chuen; Bernard Chen; Wan Soon Bee | Unopposed | | |
| Registered electors | | 101,440 | | ▲143.81 |
| PAP hold | | | | |
