= S. Dhanabalan =

Singaporean politician

S. Dhanabalan DUT
- எஸ். தநபாலன்

Minister for Trade and Industry
- In office 7 December 1992 – 1 January 1994
- Prime Minister: Goh Chok Tong
- Preceded by: Lee Hsien Loong
- Succeeded by: Yeo Cheow Tong

Minister for National Development
- In office 1 January 1987 – 31 August 1992
- Prime Minister: Lee Kuan Yew; Goh Chok Tong
- Preceded by: Teh Cheang Wan
- Succeeded by: Richard Hu

Leader of the House
- In office 2 January 1985 – 24 February 1987
- Prime Minister: Lee Kuan Yew
- Preceded by: E. W. Barker
- Succeeded by: Wong Kan Seng

Minister for Foreign Affairs
- In office 1 June 1980 – 12 September 1988
- Prime Minister: Lee Kuan Yew
- Preceded by: S. Rajaratnam
- Succeeded by: Wong Kan Seng

Member of the Singapore Parliament for Toa Payoh GRC (Kuo Chuan)
- In office 21 August 1991 – 16 December 1996
- Preceded by: Wong Kan Seng
- Succeeded by: Constituency abolished

Member of the Singapore Parliament for Kallang SMC
- In office 23 December 1976 – 14 August 1991
- Preceded by: Abdul Aziz bin Karim
- Succeeded by: Constituency abolished

Personal details
- Born: Suppiah Dhanabalan; 8 August 1937 (age 89) Singapore, Straits Settlements, British Malaya
- Party: People's Action Party
- Spouse: Christine Tan
- Children: 2
- Education: University of Malaya (BA)

Suppiah Dhanabalan (Note: Tamil: சுப்பையா தநபாலன், romanized: Cuppaiyā Tanapālaṉ) (born 8 August 1937) is a Singaporean former politician who served as Minister for Foreign Affairs between 1980 and 1988. A member of the governing People's Action Party (PAP), he was the Member of Parliament (MP) representing Kallang SMC between 1976 and 1991, and the Kuo Chuan ward of Toa Payoh GRC between 1991 and 1996.

Dhanabalan was a prominent political leader in Singapore during the 1980s, where he served as Minister for Foreign Affairs between 1980 and 1988, Minister for National Development between 1987 and 1992, and Minister for Trade and Industry between 1992 and 1993 under Prime Ministers Lee Kuan Yew and Goh Chok Tong.

He had also served as Leader of the House between 1985 and 1987.

== Early life and education ==
Dhanabalan was born in 1937 to Suppiah Arumugam (1911 – 24 May 1987), a clerk at a naval base and Gunaretnam Suppiah (1909 – 29 December 1984). He was the third child and the eldest son in a family of six children, three girls and three boys.

Born in a Singaporean Indian family of Tamil descent, he was raised as a Hindu. Later in his life, he became a devout Christian (Brethren).

He attended Victoria School before graduating from the University of Malaya with a Bachelor of Arts with second class honours degree in economics.

== Early career ==
Dhanabalan joined the Ministry of Finance as an administrative officer between 1960 and 1968. During his tenure, he helped to established the Economic Development Board and DBS Bank.

He subsequently left the Civil Service and joined DBS as a vice-president between 1968 and 1970. He was later promoted to the position executive vice-president and continue to serve between 1970 and 1978.

== Political career ==
In the 1976 Singapore general election, Dhanabalan was elected as Member of Parliament for Kallang SMC, as a People's Action Party (PAP) candidate.

During the 1980 Singaporean general election's rallies, Dhanabalan disparaged opposition politician Chiam See Tong on his professional competence. He was subsequently sued by Chiam for defamation and he issued a public apology over it.

Dhanabalan was subsequently promoted to a Cabinet Minister and served in various portfolios, including Foreign Affairs, Culture, Community Development, National Development and Trade and Industry.

When Lee Kuan Yew was preparing for his successor, he identified a handful of ministers he considered suitable for the job, including Tony Tan, Ong Teng Cheong, Goh Chok Tong and Dhanabalan.

In his public account of why he chose them and what he felt were their strengths and weaknesses, Lee said his preferred successor was Tony Tan, who went on to become the 7th President of the Republic of Singapore. He felt that while the other three were all of prime ministerial calibre, each had a particular weakness: Goh was too stiff, lacking eloquence in public speaking, and Ong was too closely aligned with the Chinese-speaking masses, lacking appeal to other communities. In the case of Dhanabalan, Lee felt the 76% ethnic Chinese electorate was not yet ready for a prime minister of Indian ethnicity. Lee left the ultimate decision to the second generation ministers themselves, who went on to choose Goh.

Dhanabalan retired from Parliament in 1996.

== Timeline ==
- 1960 : Graduated from university and joined the civil service.
- 1961–1968 : Economist with Economic Development Board.
- 1968–1978 : Helped to establish the Development Bank of Singapore.
- 1976–1991 : Member of Parliament for Kallang.
- 1980–1988 : Minister for Foreign Affairs.
- 1981–1984 : Minister for Culture.
- 1981–2005 : Director of Government Investment Corporation.
- 1984–1986 : Minister for Community Development.
- 1986–1991 : Minister for National Development.
- 1991 : Retired from politics.
- 1991–1993 : Returned to government as Minister for Trade and Industry.
- 1993–1996 : Chairman of Singapore Labour Foundation.
- 1996–1998 : Chairman of Singapore Airlines.
- 1996–2013 : Chairman of Temasek Holdings.
- 1998 : Appointed a permanent member of the Presidential Council for Minority Rights.
- 1999–2005 : Chairman of DBS Group Holdings.
- 2004–present : Member of the Council of Presidential Advisors.
- 2007 : Received the Order of Temasek (Second Class).
- 2015 : Received the Order of Temasek (First Class)

== Career after politics ==
- Senior Advisor, Nuri Holdings – 1994–1999
- Chairman, Singapore Airlines – 1996–1998
- Chairman, Temasek Holdings – 1996–2013
- Emeritus Chairperson, Temasek Trust - Current
- Director, Temasek Trust, 2015 - 2022
- Chairman, DBS Bank – 1999–2005
- Chairman, Parameswara Holdings Ltd – Current
- Director, Government of Singapore Investment Corporation – Current

=== Other contributions ===
- Member, Presidential Council for Minority Rights – Current
- Member, Council of Presidential Advisers – 2004–Current
- Member and Council chairman Emeritus, Asia Business Council – Current
- Founder Member, Singapore International Foundation
- President, Singapore Indian Development Association (SINDA) – 1996–2002
- Chairman, YMCA Advisory Council, YMCA of Singapore - 2010-2018

== Personal life ==
Dhanabalan is a devout Christian (Brethren) and attends a small church in Bukit Panjang – Bukit Panjang Gospel Chapel. He is married to Christine Tan Khoon Hiap and they have one son and one daughter.

In an interview with The Straits Times in 1984 when he was the Culture Minister, he admits that he watched "very few TV programmes" despite having a TV in his bedroom and the only programme he watched regularly was the news. However, he also prefer to watch "relaxing comedy shows and serious documentaries".

== Notes ==
Political offices
Preceded by S. Rajaratnam	Minister for Foreign Affairs; 1 June 1980 – 12 September 1988	Succeeded by Wong Kan Seng
Preceded by Ong Teng Cheong	Minister for Culture; 1981–1984	Succeeded by Yeo Ning Hong
Preceded by Position established	Minister for Community Development; 1984–1986	Succeeded by Wong Kan Seng
Preceded by Teh Cheang Wan	Minister for National Development; 1986–1992	Succeeded by Richard Hu
Preceded by Lee Hsien Loong	Minister for Trade and Industry; 1992–1994	Succeeded by Yeo Cheow Tong
