= Chay Wai Chuen =

Singaporean politician

- 谢惠泉
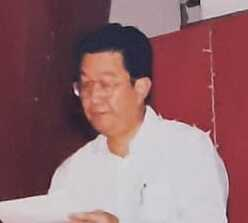
- Chay c. 1990s

Member of the Singapore Parliament for Tanjong Pagar GRC
- In office 2 January 1997 – 27 April 2006
- Preceded by: PAP held
- Succeeded by: PAP held
- Majority: 1997: N/A (walkover); 2001: N/A (walkover)

Member of the Singapore Parliament for Brickworks GRC
- In office 3 September 1988 – 2 January 1997
- Preceded by: Constituency created
- Succeeded by: Constituency abolished
- Majority: 1988: 13,893 (34.86%); 1991: N/A (walkover)

Personal details
- Born: Chay Wai Chuen; 5 March 1950 (age 76) Colony of Singapore
- Party: People's Action Party (1988–2006)
- Spouse: Agnes Tseng
- Children: 2
- Education: University of Singapore (BSS, MSS); University of Sussex (MA)
- Occupation: Politician; diplomat

Chay Wai Chuen (Note: Chinese: 谢惠泉; Jyutping: Ze^{6} Wai^{6} Cyun^{4}; pinyin: Xiè Huìquán) (born 5 March 1950) is a Singaporean diplomat and former politician. A former member of the governing People's Action Party (PAP), he was the Member of Parliament (MP) representing the Queenstown ward of Brickworks Group Representation Constituency between 1988 and 1997 and later Tanjong Pagar Group Representation Constituency between 1997 and 2006.

== Early life and education ==
Born on 5 March 1950, Chay attended St Joseph's Institution before graduating from the University of Singapore (now the National University of Singapore) with a Bachelor of Social Sciences with honours degree in economics and statistics in 1973 and a Master of Social Sciences degree in 1978.

He was also a Research Scholar in Economics at the University of Singapore between 1973 and 1974 and Council Member at the National University of Singapore between 2000 and 2004.

Chay also completed a Master of Arts degree in development economics at the University of Sussex in 1975 under the Commonwealth Scholarship.

He graduated from the Singapore Command and Staff College in 1988 and attended the six-week Advanced Management Program at Harvard Business School.

== Career ==
Chay served as the chief financial officer and chief logistics officer of NTUC Fairprice Co-operative Ltd, a food retailing chain, where he worked from 1996 to 2007. He was also the chief executive officer of its subsidiary, Grocery Logistics of Singapore Pte Ltd.

In 2008, Chay was the Managing Director (Retail Property Management) at GuocoLand Limited.

=== Political career ===
Chay served as a Member of Parliament between 1988 and 2006 and was a member of the Public Accounts Committee between 1993 and 2006.

During this period, Chay served as Chairman of the Government Parliamentary Committee (GPC) for Communications and IT between 1997 and 2001. As chairman of the GPC for communication, he had proposed the system of bidding for Certificate of Entitlement to own a car.

Chay was also the chairman of the GPC for Transport between 2002 and 2004.

Chay was also Chairman of the Brickworks Town Council between 1991 and 1997 and later Tanjong Pagar Town Council between 2001 and 2004.

Chay announced his retirement from politics on 11 April 2006.

=== Diplomatic career ===
In 2008, Chay was appointed Singapore's non-resident ambassador to Sri Lanka. As of 2011, he was still the ambassador.

== Personal life ==
Chay is married to Agnes Tseng and they have two children.

In 2017, Chay was awarded the Bintang Bakti Masyarakat.
