= Yeo Cheow Tong =

Singaporean politician

- 姚照东

Minister for Transport
- In office 23 November 2001 – 29 May 2006
- Prime Minister: Goh Chok Tong; Lee Hsien Loong
- Preceded by: Himself (Post renamed from Minister for Communications and Information Technology)
- Succeeded by: Raymond Lim

Minister for Communications and Information Technology
- In office 3 June 1999 – 22 November 2001
- Prime Minister: Goh Chok Tong
- Preceded by: Mah Bow Tan
- Succeeded by: Himself (As Minister for Transport)

Minister for the Environment
- In office 25 January 1997 – 2 June 1999
- Prime Minister: Goh Chok Tong
- Preceded by: Teo Chee Hean
- Succeeded by: Lee Yock Suan

Minister for Health
- In office 28 November 1990 – 31 December 1993; Acting: 1 January 1987 - 27 November 1990
- Prime Minister: Goh Chok Tong
- Preceded by: George Yeo
- Succeeded by: Lim Hng Kiang

Minister for Trade and Industry
- In office 1 January 1994 – 24 January 1997
- Prime Minister: Goh Chok Tong
- Preceded by: S. Dhanabalan
- Succeeded by: George Yeo

Minister for Community Development
- In office 7 September 1991 – 31 December 1993
- Prime Minister: Goh Chok Tong
- Preceded by: Seet Ai Mee
- Succeeded by: Abdullah Tarmugi

Senior Minister of State for Foreign Affairs
- In office 13 September 1988 – 27 November 1990
- Prime Minister: Lee Kuan Yew

Member of the Singapore Parliament for Hong Kah SMC
- In office 22 December 1984 – 17 August 1988
- Preceded by: Constituency created
- Succeeded by: Constituency abolished

Member of the Singapore Parliament for Hong Kah GRC
- In office 24 August 1988 – 19 April 2011
- Preceded by: Constituency created
- Succeeded by: Constituency abolished

Personal details
- Born: Yeo Cheow Tong; 22 June 1947 (age 79) Colony of Singapore
- Party: People's Action Party
- Spouse: Helen Tan Cheng Hoong
- Children: 3
- Education: University of Western Australia
- Occupation: Politician

Yeo Cheow Tong (Note: Chinese: 姚照东; Pe̍h-ōe-jī: Iô Chiàu-tong; pinyin: Yáo Zhàodōng) (born 22 June 1947) is a former Singaporean politician. A member of the governing People's Action Party (PAP), he served in the Cabinet from 1990 to 2006, and was a Member of Parliament (MP) of Hong Kah Single Member Constituency (SMC) from 12 December 1984 to 17 August 1988 and MP of Hong Kah Group Representation Constituency (GRC) from 24 August 1988 to 19 April 2011 for almost 27 years.

== Early life ==
Yeo was educated at Anglo-Chinese School, before receiving a Colombo Plan Scholarship in 1967 to study at the University of Western Australia, where he received a Bachelor of Engineering (Mechanical) degree.

== Career ==
Yeo worked for Singapore's Economic Development Board (EDB) from 1972 to 1975, before entering the private sector. He entered politics in 1984. At the 1984 general election, Yeo was elected a Member of Parliament for Hong Kah Constituency. In 1985, he was appointed a Minister of State at the Ministry of Health and Ministry of Foreign Affairs.

In 1988, Yeo became the Acting Minister for Health, before becoming a full member of the Cabinet in 1990. He went on to hold a number of different Cabinet positions including Minister of Health (1990–94, 1997–99), Minister for Community Development (1991–94), Minister for Trade and Industry (1994–97), Minister for the Environment (1997–99), Minister for Communications and Information Technology (1999–2001), and Minister for Transport (2001–06).

In June 2006, after the announcement of the new Cabinet of Singapore, Prime Minister of Singapore Lee Hsien Loong said Yeo had intended to retire from politics but had persuaded him to continue as an MP after stepping down from the Cabinet. He continued to serve as a Member of Parliament for the Hong Kah Group Representation Constituency until 2011, when he retired from politics.

== Personal life ==
Yeo is married to lawyer Helen Tan Cheng Hoong. The couple have three children and 6 grandchildren.

== Notes ==
Political offices
Preceded by Richard Hu Tsu Tau	Minister for Health; 1988-1990 (Acting); 1990-1993	Succeeded by George Yeo
Preceded by Seet Ai Mei	Minister for Community Development; 1991–1993	Succeeded by Abdullah Tarmugi
Preceded by S. Dhanabalan	Minister for Trade and Industry; 1994-1997	Succeeded by George Yeo
Preceded by George Yeo	Minister for Health; 1997-1999	Succeeded by Lim Hng Kiang
Preceded by Teo Chee Hean	Minister for the Environment; 1997-1999	Succeeded by Lee Yock Suan
Preceded by Mah Bow Tan	Minister for Communications and Information Technology; 1999-2001	Succeeded by Post renamed to Minister for Transport
Preceded by Post renamed from Ministry of Communications and Information Technology	Minister for Transport; 2001-2006	Succeeded by Raymond Lim
