= Mah Bow Tan =

Singaporean businessman and former politician

- 马宝山
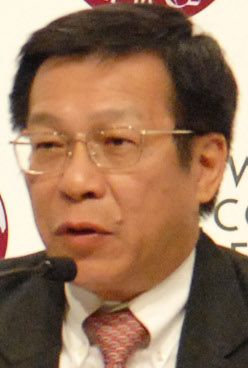
- Mah at the World Economic Forum Global Redesign Summit 2010 in Doha

Leader of the House
- In office 1 April 2007 – 30 May 2011
- Prime Minister: Lee Hsien Loong
- Preceded by: Wong Kan Seng
- Succeeded by: Ng Eng Hen

Minister for National Development
- In office 3 June 1999 – 20 May 2011
- Prime Minister: Goh Chok Tong; Lee Hsien Loong
- Preceded by: Lim Hng Kiang
- Succeeded by: Khaw Boon Wan

Minister for the Environment
- In office 1 July 1993 – 16 April 1995
- Prime Minister: Goh Chok Tong
- Preceded by: Ahmad Mattar
- Succeeded by: Teo Chee Hean

Minister for Communications
- In office 1 September 1991 – 3 June 1999; Acting: 1 July 1991 – 31 August 1991
- Prime Minister: Goh Chok Tong
- Preceded by: Yeo Ning Hong (as Minister for Communications and Information)
- Succeeded by: Yeo Cheow Tong (as Minister for Communications and Information Technology)

Member of the Singapore Parliament for Tampines GRC
- In office 3 September 1988 – 25 August 2015
- Preceded by: Constituency established
- Succeeded by: PAP held

Personal details
- Born: Mah Bow Tan; 12 September 1948 (age 78) Colony of Singapore
- Party: People's Action Party
- Spouse: Sheryn Kaye Von Senden
- Education: University of New South Wales (BEng, MEng)

Mah Bow Tan (Note: Chinese: 马宝山; Bǽh-oe-tu: Mâ Bó-tan; pinyin: Mǎ Bǎoshān) (born 12 September 1948) is a Singaporean former politician who served as Leader of the House between 2007 and 2011, Minister for National Development between 1999 and 2011, Minister for the Environment from 1993 to 1995, and Minister for Communications between 1991 and 1999. A former member of the People's Action Party, he was a Member of Parliament (MP) for Tampines Group Representation Constituency (GRC) between 1988 and 2015.

== Education ==
Mah attended St. Michael's School and St. Joseph's Institution before graduating from the University of New South Wales in 1971 with a Bachelor of Engineering with first class honours degree in industrial engineering under the President's Scholarship and Colombo Plan Scholarship. Mah also won the University Medal for being the top student in engineering.

He subsequently went on to complete a Master of Engineering degree in operations research at the University of New South Wales in 1973 and received an honorary doctorate from the university in 2001.

== Career ==
After completing his university education, Mah worked in the Singapore Bus Service from 1973 to 1983 and became its general manager. He was then seconded to Singapore News and Publications to serve as the chief executive officer of the Singapore Monitor newspaper. From 1985 to 1988, he was the group general manager of Singapore Press Holdings, which was formed from the 1984 merger of Singapore News and Publications and two other organisations.

=== Political career ===
==== 1984 general election ====
Mah entered politics in the 1984 general election when he contested as a candidate of the governing People's Action Party (PAP) in Potong Pasir Single Member Constituency (SMC) against Chiam See Tong of the opposition Singapore Democratic Party. He lost to Chiam, who won with 60.28% of the vote. Lee Kuan Yew, the PAP's leader, was thought to have played a role in Mah's electoral defeat, having been seen as being unnecessarily dismissive in comparing Chiam's average GCE Ordinary Level results to Mah's stellar academic achievements.

==== 1988–2015 ====
During the 1988 general election, Mah joined a three-member PAP team contesting in Tampines GRC and they won with 61% of the vote, so Mah became a Member of Parliament representing Tampines GRC. Since then, he and the PAP team in Tampines GRC had won the subsequent five general elections (1991, 1997, 2001, 2006 and 2011) against the opposition Singapore Democratic Alliance and National Solidarity Party. Excluding an uncontested walkover in 1997, Mah and the PAP team in Tampines GRC won with results of between 73.34% (in 2001) and 57.22% (in 2011) of the vote during those five general elections.

In 1990, Mah was appointed Minister of State at the Ministry of Trade and Industry and Ministry of Communications. A year later, he was appointed to the Cabinet as Acting Minister for Communications while concurrently holding the post of Minister of State for Trade and Industry.

Mah served as Singapore's Minister for Communications from 1991 to 1999. He concurrently served as the Minister for the Environment from 1993 to 1995. He was appointed Minister for National Development in 1999 and served until 2011. He also served as Deputy Leader of the House in Parliament from 2002 to 2007, and Leader of the House from 2007 to 2011.

On 20 May 2011, Mah said at a Building and Construction Authority event that he accepted responsibility over public unhappiness due to a sharp increase in housing prices over the previous years. He stepped down from his Cabinet position as Minister for National Development after the 2011 general election. In a 2013 Chinese-language book published by the Hainan Culture and Heritage Centre, Mah refuted rumours that he had to step down because he had seemingly been blamed for growing public unhappiness over sky-rocketing property prices, claiming that he stepped down to make way for younger, talented people to take over.

Throughout his political career, Mah had also held other positions, including chairman of the board of directors of NTUC Comfort from 1983 to 1986; chairman of the National Productivity Board, National Productivity Council and Skills Redevelopment Fund Advisory Council; chairman of the board of governors of the Singapore Institute of Labour Studies from 1990 to 2002; and president of the Football Association of Singapore from 1999 to 2004. Mah announced his retirement from politics on 23 August 2015 just before the 2015 general election.

== Post-political career ==
After retiring from politics in 2015, Mah was appointed as an independent director and non-executive chairman of Global Yellow Pages in September 2011. In November 2018, Mah joined Singapore-based fintech firm HydraX as an adviser and director, in addition to serving as chairman of GlobalCities Sustainable Investment. He stepped down as non-executive chairman of Global Yellow Pages in 2020 and has been non-executive deputy chairman and non-independent director since then.

== Personal life ==
Mah is married to Sheryn Kaye Von Senden.

In 2011, the Flower Dome and Heritage Garden at Gardens by the Bay named a dendrobium Mah Bow Tan in his honour.

== Notes ==
Political offices
Preceded by Yeo Ning Hong	Minister for Communications; September 1991 - 3 June 1999	Succeeded by Yeo Cheow Tong
Preceded by Ahmad Mattar	Minister for the Environment; 7 July 1993 - 16 April 1995	Succeeded by Teo Chee Hean
Preceded by Lim Hng Kiang	Minister for National Development; 3 June 1999 - 21 May 2011	Succeeded by Khaw Boon Wan
