= Yeo Ning Hong =

Singaporean politician

Yeo Ning Hong DUBC
- 杨林丰

Minister for Defence
- In office 1 July 1991 – 1 July 1994
- Prime Minister: Goh Chok Tong
- Preceded by: Goh Chok Tong
- Succeeded by: Lee Boon Yang

Minister for Communications
- In office 1 June 1984 – 30 June 1991; Acting: 7 September 1983 – 31 May 1984
- Prime Minister: Lee Kuan Yew
- Preceded by: Ong Pang Boon
- Succeeded by: Mah Bow Tan

Member of Parliament for Kampong Glam GRC
- In office 21 August 1991 – 16 December 1996
- Preceded by: Constituency established
- Succeeded by: Constituency abolished

Member of Parliament for Kim Seng SMC
- In office 23 December 1980 – 14 August 1991
- Preceded by: Ong Leong Boon
- Succeeded by: Constituency abolished

Personal details
- Born: Yeo Ning Hong; 3 November 1943 (age 82) Singapore, Straits Settlements
- Party: People's Action Party
- Education: University of Singapore; University of Cambridge (PhD)

Adrian Yeo Ning Hong (Note: Chinese: 杨林丰; Pe̍h-ūe-jī: Iôⁿ Lîng-hong; pinyin: Yáng Línfēng) (born 3 November 1943) is a Singaporean chemist and former politician. He served as Minister for Defence from 1991 to 1994, and Minister for Communications from 1984 to 1991. A former member of the governing People's Action Party (PAP), he was the Member of Parliament (MP) for Kim Seng SMC from 1980 to 1991 and later the Kim Seng division of Kampong Glam GRC from 1991 to 1996.

== Education ==
Yeo studied in University of Singapore and also graduated with a PhD from the University of Cambridge. He was also a research fellow of Christ's College, Cambridge between 1970 and 1973.

== Post political career ==
Since retiring from politics, Yeo has served as the Executive Chairman of the Singapore Technologies Group and the Chairman of the Port of Singapore Authority. He has also published several books under the pen name "Adrian Yeo".

== Notes ==
Political offices
Preceded by Ong Teng Cheong	Minister for Communications and Information; 1985–1990	Succeeded by Mah Bow Tan
Preceded by Goh Chok Tong	Minister for Defence; 1990–1994	Succeeded by Lee Boon Yang
