= 9th Parliament of Singapore =

Singaporean parliamentary meeting

←	8th	10th	→
Composition as of 1 October 1997
Government:
PAP (81)
Opposition:
WP (2)
SPP (1)
NMP (9)

Overview
- Legislative body: Parliament of Singapore
- Meeting place: Old Parliament House (until 1999); Parliament House (from 1999)
- Term: 26 May 1997 – 18 October 2001 (4 years, 4 months and 22 days)
- Election: 2 January 1997
- Government: People's Action Party
- Opposition: Workers' Party; Singapore People's Party

Parliament of Singapore
- Members: 83 + 1 NCMP + 9 NMPs
- Speaker: Tan Soo Khoon
- Leader of the House: Wong Kan Seng
- Prime Minister: Goh Chok Tong
- Leader of the Opposition: Chiam See Tong
- Party control: PAP supermajority

Sessions
- 1st: 26 May 1997 – 8 September 1999 (2 years, 3 months and 13 days)
- 2nd: 4 October 1999 – 18 October 2001 (1 year, 11 months and 24 days)

The 9th Parliament of Singapore was a meeting of the Parliament of Singapore. Its first session commenced on 26 May 1997 and was prorogued on 8 September 1999. It commenced its second session on 4 October 1999 and was dissolved on 18 October 2001.

The members of the Ninth Parliament were elected in the 1997 general election. Parliament was controlled by a People's Action Party majority, led by Prime Minister Goh Chok Tong and his Cabinet. The Speaker was Tan Soo Khoon.

Businesswoman Claire Chiang, businessmen Chuang Shaw Peng, Tay Beng Chuan and Zulkifli Baharudin, accountant Gerard Ee, lawyer Shriniwas Rai, trade unionist Cyrille Tan, and academic Simon Tay were appointed for two-year terms as Nominated Members of Parliament on 2 October 1997, joined by incumbent NMP Lee Tsao Yuan. On 2 October 1999, Chiang, Ee, Simon Tay, Tay Beng Chuan, and Zulkifli went on to serve second terms, joined by doctor Jennifer Lee and businessmen Goh Chong Chia, Noris Ong, and Thomas Thomas. All except for Chiang, Ee, and Zulkifli would be sworn in for another term on 2 October 2001, alongside human rights activist Braema Mathi and lawyer Chandra Mohan Nair, leaving one NMP seat vacant.

Two seats fell vacant during the term, namely Jalan Besar GRC MP Choo Wee Khiang, who resigned on 3 December 1999, and Non-constituency MP J. B. Jeyaretnam, who was removed from this seat on 23 July 2001. With Ho Kah Leong's departure, Senior Minister Lee Kuan Yew became the last MP from the pre-independence Legislative Assembly to remain in office.

== Results of the 1997 general election ==
Party	Votes	%	Seats	+/–
People's Action Party	465,751	64.98	81	▲4
Workers' Party	101,544	14.17	2	▲1
Singapore Democratic Party	76,129	10.62	0	▼3
National Solidarity Party	48,322	6.74	0	Steady
Singapore People's Party	16,746	2.34	1	▲1
Democratic Progressive Party	5,043	0.70	0	New
Independents	3,210	0.45	0	Steady
Total	716,745	100.00	84	▲3
Valid votes	716,745	97.65		
Invalid/blank votes	17,255	2.35		
Total votes	734,000	100.00		
Registered voters/turnout	765,332	95.91		
Source: Singapore Elections

== Officeholders ==
- Speaker: Tan Soo Khoon (East Coast GRC, PAP)
- Deputy Speaker:
  - Eugene Yap (Marine Parade GRC, PAP)
- Prime Minister: Goh Chok Tong (Marine Parade GRC, PAP)
- Deputy Prime Minister:
  - Lee Hsien Loong (Ang Mo Kio GRC, PAP)
  - Tony Tan (Sembawang GRC, PAP)
- Leader of the Opposition: Chiam See Tong (Potong Pasir SMC, SPP)
- Leader of the House: Wong Kan Seng (Bishan–Toa Payoh GRC, PAP)
- Government Party Whip: Lee Boon Yang (Jalan Besar GRC, PAP)
- Deputy Government Party Whip:
  - Goh Chee Wee (Boon Lay SMC, PAP)
  - Ong Chit Chung (Bukit Timah GRC, PAP)

== Composition ==
Political party	Members	
Political party	At election	At dissolution
People's Action Party	81	80
Workers' Party	1 + 1 NCMP	1
Singapore People's Party	1	1
Nominated Members of Parliament	0	8
Vacant seats	6	3
Total	90	93
Government majority	79	78

== Members ==
Constituency	Division	Member	Party
Aljunied GRC	Aljunied	Toh See Kiat 杜世杰	PAP
Aljunied GRC	Changi–Simei	David Lim 林得恩	PAP
Aljunied GRC	Eunos	Sidek Saniff صديق صانف	PAP
Aljunied GRC	Kampong Kembangan	George Yeo 杨荣文	PAP
Aljunied GRC	Paya Lebar	Ker Sin Tze 柯新治	PAP
Ang Mo Kio GRC	Ang Mo Kio	Tang Guan Seng 陈原生	PAP
Ang Mo Kio GRC	Kebun Baru	Inderjit Singh ਇੰਦਰਜੀਤ ਸਿੰਘ	PAP
Ang Mo Kio GRC	Nee Soon South	Tan Boon Wan 陈文焕	PAP
Ang Mo Kio GRC	Teck Ghee	Lee Hsien Loong 李显龙	PAP
Ang Mo Kio GRC	Yio Chu Kang	Seng Han Thong 成汉通	PAP
Ayer Rajah SMC		Tan Cheng Bock 陈清木	PAP
Bishan–Toa Payoh GRC	Bishan East	Wong Kan Seng 黄根成	PAP
Bishan–Toa Payoh GRC	Bishan North	Ho Tat Kin 何达坚	PAP
Bishan–Toa Payoh GRC	Thomson	Leong Horn Kee 梁汉基	PAP
Bishan–Toa Payoh GRC	Toa Payoh Central	Ibrahim Othman إبراهيم عثمان	PAP
Bishan–Toa Payoh GRC	Toa Payoh East	Davinder Singh ਦਵਿੰਦਰ ਸਿੰਘ	PAP
Boon Lay SMC		Goh Chee Wee 吴志伟	PAP
Bukit Gombak SMC		Ang Mong Seng 洪茂诚	PAP
Bukit Timah GRC	Bukit Batok	Ong Chit Chung 翁执中	PAP
Bukit Timah GRC	Bukit Timah	Wang Kai Yuen 王家园	PAP
Bukit Timah GRC	Jurong	R. Ravindran ரவீந்திரன்	PAP
Bukit Timah GRC	Ulu Pandan	Lim Boon Heng 林文兴	PAP
Bukit Timah GRC	Yuhua	Yu-Foo Yee Shoon 于符喜泉	PAP
Cheng San GRC	Cheng San	Lee Yock Suan 李玉全	PAP
Cheng San GRC	Jalan Kayu	Heng Chiang Meng 王章明	PAP
Cheng San GRC	Punggol Central	Michael Lim 林俊龙	PAP
Cheng San GRC	Punggol East	Zainul Abidin زین العابدین	PAP
Cheng San GRC	Punggol South	Yeo Guat Kwang 杨木光	PAP
Chua Chu Kang SMC		Low Seow Chay 刘绍济	PAP
East Coast GRC	Bedok	S. Jayakumar எஸ். செயக்குமார்	PAP
East Coast GRC	Fengshan	Chng Hee Kok 庄熙国	PAP
East Coast GRC	Joo Chiat	Chan Soo Sen 曾士生	PAP
East Coast GRC	Kaki Bukit	Chew Heng Ching 周亨增	PAP
East Coast GRC	Kampong Chai Chee	Tan Soo Khoon 陈树群	PAP
East Coast GRC	Siglap	Abdullah Tarmugi عبد الله موعي	PAP
Hong Kah GRC	Hong Kah East	Kenneth Chen 陈冠立	PAP
Hong Kah GRC	Hong Kah North	John Chen 陈晓朋	PAP
Hong Kah GRC	Hong Kah West	Harun Abdul Ghani هارون عبد الغني	PAP
Hong Kah GRC	Nanyang	Peter Chen 陈敏良	PAP
Hong Kah GRC	Yew Tee	Yeo Cheow Tong 姚照东	PAP
Hougang SMC		Low Thia Khiang 刘程强	WP
Jalan Besar GRC	Geylang West	Peh Chin Hua 白振华	PAP
Jalan Besar GRC	Jalan Besar	Lee Boon Yang 李文献	PAP
Jalan Besar GRC	Kolam Ayer	Yaacob Ibrahim يعقوب إبراهيم	PAP
Jalan Besar GRC	Whampoa	Choo Wee Khiang (until 1999) (Note: Choo resigned on 3 December 1999 after being convicted for cheating.) 朱为强	PAP
Kampong Glam SMC		Loh Meng See 罗明士	PAP
Kreta Ayer–Tanglin GRC	Kim Seng	Lily Neo 梁莉莉	PAP
Kreta Ayer–Tanglin GRC	Kreta Ayer	Richard Hu 胡赐道	PAP
Kreta Ayer–Tanglin GRC	Moulmein	R. Sinnakaruppan ஆர். சின்னக்கருப்பன்	PAP
Kreta Ayer–Tanglin GRC	Tanglin	Lew Syn Pau 刘信保	PAP
MacPherson SMC		Matthias Yao 姚智	PAP
Marine Parade GRC	Braddell Heights	Goh Choon Kang 吴俊刚	PAP
Marine Parade GRC	Geylang Serai	Othman Haron Eusofe عثمان هارون يوسف	PAP
Marine Parade GRC	Kampong Ubi	Maidin Packer ميدين فقير	PAP
Marine Parade GRC	Marine Parade	Goh Chok Tong 吴作栋	PAP
Marine Parade GRC	Mountbatten	Eugene Yap 叶尧清	PAP
Marine Parade GRC	Serangoon	Lim Hwee Hua 林陈惠华	PAP
Nee Soon Central SMC		Ng Pock Too 吴博韬	PAP
Pasir Ris GRC	Pasir Ris Central	Ahmad Magad أحمد ماعاد	PAP
Pasir Ris GRC	Pasir Ris Elias	Charles Chong 张有福	PAP
Pasir Ris GRC	Pasir Ris Loyang	Teo Chee Hean 张志贤	PAP
Pasir Ris GRC	Pasir Ris South	Ong Kian Min 王建明	PAP
Potong Pasir SMC		Chiam See Tong 詹时中	SPP
Sembawang GRC	Bukit Panjang	Teo Ho Pin 张俰宾	PAP
Sembawang GRC	Chong Pang	K. Shanmugam கா. சண்முகம்	PAP
Sembawang GRC	Marsiling	Hawazi Daipi هاوازي دايڤي	PAP
Sembawang GRC	Nee Soon East	Ho Peng Kee 何炳基	PAP
Sembawang GRC	Sembawang	Tony Tan 陈庆炎	PAP
Sembawang GRC	Woodlands	Chin Tet Yung 陈德镛	PAP
Tampines GRC	Tampines Central	Sin Boon Ann 陈文安	PAP
Tampines GRC	Tampines Changkat	Aline Wong 黄简丽中	PAP
Tampines GRC	Tampines East	Mah Bow Tan 马宝山	PAP
Tampines GRC	Tampines West	Yatiman Yusof ياتيمان يوسف	PAP
Tanjong Pagar GRC	Buona Vista	Lim Swee Say 林瑞生	PAP
Tanjong Pagar GRC	Leng Kee	Ow Chin Hock 欧进福	PAP
Tanjong Pagar GRC	Queenstown	Chay Wai Chuen 谢惠泉	PAP
Tanjong Pagar GRC	Radin Mas	S. Vasoo எஸ். வாசு	PAP
Tanjong Pagar GRC	Tiong Bahru	Koo Tsai Kee 顾蔡矶	PAP
Tanjong Pagar GRC	Tanjong Pagar	Lee Kuan Yew 李光耀	PAP
West Coast GRC	Clementi	Bernard Chen 陈天立	PAP
West Coast GRC	Pasir Panjang	S. Iswaran எஸ். ஈஸ்வரன்	PAP
West Coast GRC	Telok Blangah	Lim Hng Kiang 林勋强	PAP
West Coast GRC	West Coast	Wan Soon Bee 阮顺美	PAP
Non-constituency Member of Parliament		J. B. Jeyaretnam (Note: Jeyaretnam lost his NCMP seat on 23 July 2001 after being declared bankrupt.) ஜே. பி. ஜெயரத்தினம்	WP
Nominated Members of Parliament		Claire Chiang (1997–2001) 张齐娥	NMP
Nominated Members of Parliament		Chuang Shaw Peng (1997–1999) 庄绍平	NMP
Nominated Members of Parliament		Gerard Ee (1997–2001) 余福金	NMP
Nominated Members of Parliament		Lee Tsao Yuan (1997–1999) 李曹圆	NMP
Nominated Members of Parliament		Shriniwas Rai (1997–2001) श्रीनिवास राय	NMP
Nominated Members of Parliament		Cyrille Tan (1997–2001) 陈顺龙	NMP
Nominated Members of Parliament		Tay Beng Chuan (from 1997) 郑民川	NMP
Nominated Members of Parliament		Simon Tay (from 1997) 戴尚志	NMP
Nominated Members of Parliament		Zulkifli Baharudin (1997–2001) ذوالكفل البحرين	NMP
Nominated Members of Parliament		Goh Chong Chia (from 1999) 吴崇正	NMP
Nominated Members of Parliament		Jennifer Lee (from 1999) 李玉珠	NMP
Nominated Members of Parliament		Noris Ong (from 1999) 王振源	NMP
Nominated Members of Parliament		Thomas Thomas (from 1999) தாமஸ் தாமஸ்	NMP
Nominated Members of Parliament		Braema Mathi (from 2001) பிரேமா மதி	NMP
Nominated Members of Parliament		Chandra Mohan Nair (from 2001) ചന്ദ്ര മോഹൻ നായർ	NMP
