= 2001 Singaporean general election =

- 3 November 2001

All 84 directly elected seats in Parliament (and up to 3 NCMPs)
- Registered: 2,036,923 (Note: 1,361,617 of the 2,036,923 voters were registered in uncontested constituencies, leaving 675,306 voters able to vote.)
- Turnout: 94.61% (▼1.30pp)
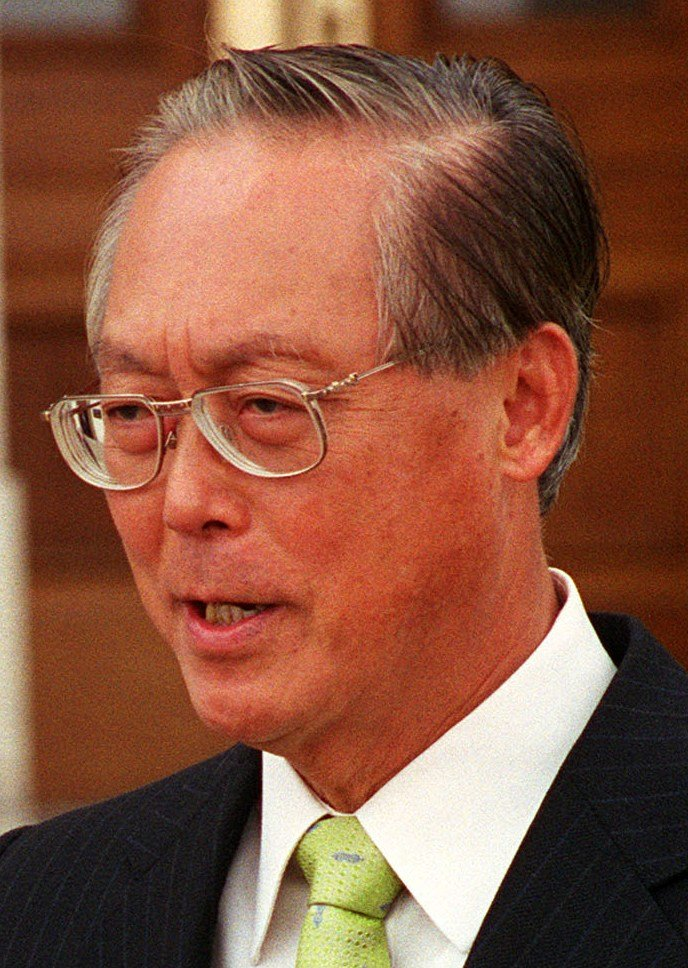

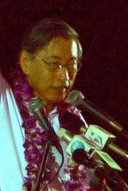

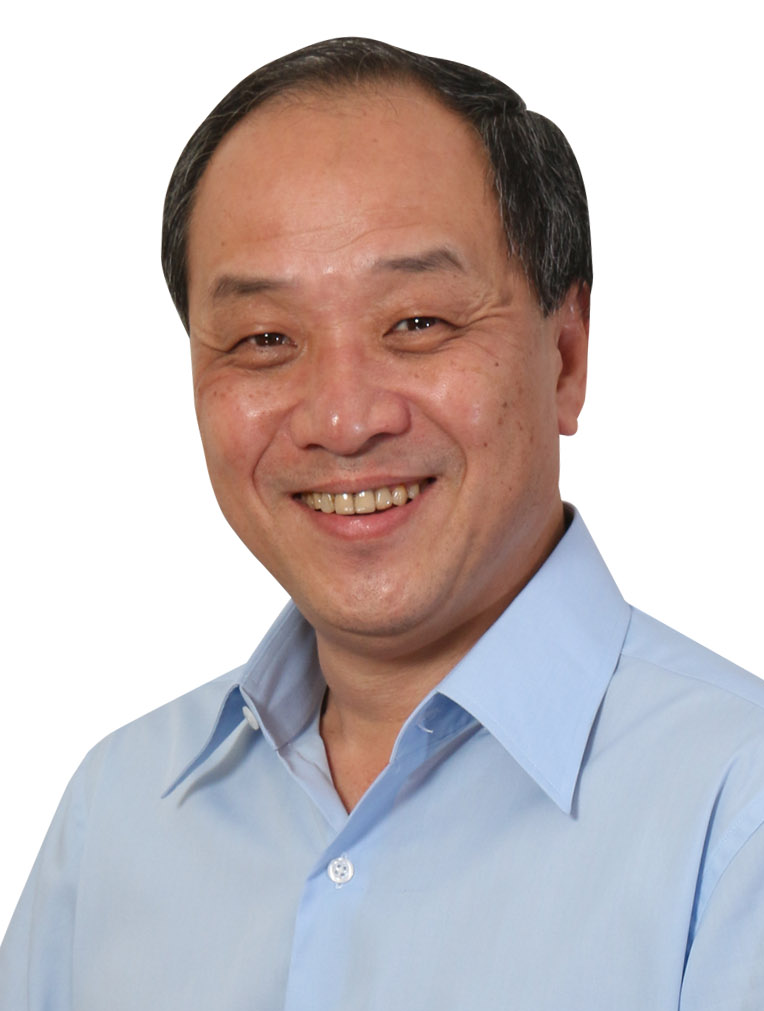
	First party	Second party	Third party
Leader	Goh Chok Tong	Chiam See Tong	Low Thia Khiang
Party	PAP	SDA	WP
Leader's seat	Marine Parade GRC	Potong Pasir SMC	Hougang SMC
Last election	64.98%, 81 seats	–	14.17%, 2 seats
Seats won	82	2	1
Seat change	▲1	New	▼1
Popular vote	470,765	75,248	19,060
Percentage	75.29%	12.03%	3.05%
Swing	▲10.31pp	New	▼11.12pp
- Results by constituency
Prime Minister before election
Goh Chok Tong
PAP
Prime Minister after election
Goh Chok Tong
PAP

General elections were held in Singapore on 3 November 2001 to elect members of Parliament. They were the eleventh general elections since the introduction of self-government in 1959 and the ninth since independence in 1965. This was Goh Chok Tong's last election as prime minister prior to the handover of deputy prime minister Lee Hsien Loong, who is the son of Lee Kuan Yew, in August 2004.

The elections came among the shortest timeline between the announcement of the electoral boundaries to polling day, as Prime Minister Goh called a snap election a year ahead of the intended February 2002 timeline amidst the backdrop of the ongoing September 11 attacks, occurring two months prior, which became one of the topics mentioned in the hustings. Other key issues include the leadership transition, the rising cost-of-living, as well as economic downcast.

The number of parliamentary seats increased from 83 to 84 following adjustments to electoral boundaries. However, it saw the most number of uncontested walkovers during nomination since 1968 where 55 of them, amounting to nearly two-thirds supermajority of seats, were uncontested. On polling day, the PAP won the other 27 seats out of the 29 it contested with a 75.29% vote share, its strongest showing since the 1980 election. The two seats won by the oppositions were Chiam See Tong of the Singapore People's Party (SPP) and founder of Singapore Democratic Alliance (SDA), who retained his seat in Potong Pasir SMC, and Low Thia Khiang of the Workers' Party (WP), who retained his seat in Hougang SMC. One Non-constituency Member of Parliament (NCMP) was offered to Steve Chia of the SDA in Chua Chu Kang SMC, who was the best-performing losing opposition candidate and was the first NCMP that was not from the WP to be offered and took that seat.

Voter turnout in contested constituencies stood at 94.61%, slightly lower from the preceding general election. This election was the first in which the total eligible voter population exceeded 2 million, although only one third of them (675,306 of the 2,036,923 eligible voters) actually voted. As of 2025, it remains the most recent general election in which the PAP returned to power on nomination day, as well as the leading opposition party represented in Parliament not being WP.

== Background ==
A seat in Jalan Besar GRC was vacated in 1999 following the conviction of People's Action Party (PAP) MP Choo Wee Khiang for cheating. However, no by-election was held, as the vacancy occurred within a group representation constituency (GRC). The responsibilities of Choo's division of Whampoa were instead redistributed among the remaining MPs in the GRC. Under Singapore law, a by-election can only be called in a GRC if all of its seats are vacated. The last instance of this occurring was the Marine Parade GRC by-election in 1992.

=== Global situation ===
The ruling PAP government led by prime minister Goh Chok Tong had initially planned to hold the election as scheduled in 2002. However, it was brought forward after Singapore experienced an economic slowdown linked to the lingering effects of the 1997 Asian financial crisis, the dot-com bubble and the early 2000s recession, which were further worsened by the September 11 attacks in the United States. The 2001 election had the shortest election period in Singapore's history, lasting only 17 days from the release of the electoral boundaries report and the certification of the registers of electors towards polling day. Seeking to renew his mandate swiftly, Goh aimed to secure public confidence amid the downturn.

=== Effects of the September 11 attacks ===
Earlier on 15 May, five months before the election, the legislature passed a bill to amend the Parliamentary Elections (Amendment) Act 2001, allowing voting in overseas for the first time. The 2001 elections could've marked the first time overseas voters are allowed to cast their ballots; however, Elections Department announced that the overseas voting and lunchtime rallies will both be cancelled per security concerns, though campaigning in the evening will not be affected. Additional security measures will also apply during campaigning and polling day.

As also a result of the economic shifts and inflation, the election deposit was raised sharply by S$5,000 from $8,000 to $13,000, marking one of the largest increases to date. The maximum amount for candidates in terms of campaigning expenses per voter was also raised from $2.50 to $3.

=== Non-PAP political parties ===
==== Singapore Democratic Alliance (SDA) ====
For the first time since the 1963 election, a formal opposition coalition was formed. Known as the Singapore Democratic Alliance (SDA), comprised four parties: the leading Singapore People's Party (SPP), the National Solidarity Party (NSP), the Pertubuhan Kebangsaan Melayu Singapura (PKMS) and the Singapore Justice Party (SJP). It was led by SPP secretary-general Chiam See Tong. The SDA fielded 13 candidates in the election, with the NSP contributing nine, the SPP four and the PKMS providing the required Malay minority candidate.

All but one of their contests were straight fights; the sole exception being Bukit Timah SMC, which saw the only three-cornered contest of the election involving the SDA and an independent candidate. According to the SDA, four other opposition parties declined invitations to join the coalition, including the more established Singapore Democratic Party (SDP) and the Workers' Party (WP). The other two were the Democratic Progressive Party (DPP) and the Singapore National Front (SNF), the latter of which had not yet contested any election since its founding in 1991.

==== Singapore Democratic Party (SDP) ====
The Singapore Democratic Party (SDP) fielded 11 candidates across three constituencies. Its secretary-general Chee Soon Juan and his sister, Chee Siok Chin, led the party's team in the newly created Jurong GRC. Former MPs Cheo Chai Chen (Nee Soon Central SMC) and Ling How Doong (Bukit Gombak SMC), both of whom had served in the 8th Parliament after being elected in the 1991 election, contested in Hong Kah GRC and Nee Soon Central SMC respectively in an effort to return to Parliament.

==== Workers' Party (WP) ====
Former Workers' Party (WP) Non-Constituency Member of Parliament (NCMP) Joshua Benjamin Jeyaretnam, who lost his seat in July 2001 after being declared bankrupt following defamation lawsuits filed by PAP leaders, resigned from the party citing disagreements with its current leadership. The party's only MP, Low Thia Khiang, subsequently assumed the position of secretary-general. On nomination day, the WP was successfully nominated in only two constituencies, Hougang SMC and Nee Soon East SMC.

Its proposed team for Aljunied GRC, comprising chairman Tan Bin Seng, second vice-chairman Huang Seow Kwang (both of whom had contested in Cheng San GRC in 1997) and new members Abdul Rahim Abdul Rahman, James Gomez and Yaw Shin Leong, was disqualified for submitting incomplete nomination papers. Low described the Aljunied team's disqualification as an "oversight" and accepted responsibility for the error. Plans to contest in Ang Mo Kio GRC, East Coast GRC and Pasir Ris–Punggol GRC were also later withdrawn after the party's teams failed to appear at their respective nomination centres, and as a result, the election marked the fewest number of seats contested by the WP in over three decades since the 1968 election, when the party also fielded candidates in only two constituencies during a period when most opposition parties boycotted the polls.

== Timeline ==
Date	Event
17 October	Publication of Electoral Boundaries report; Certification of Registers of Electors
18 October	Dissolution of 9th Parliament; Writ of Election issued
25 October	Nomination Day
26 October to 2 November	Campaigning Period
3 November	Polling Day
25 March 2002	Opening of 10th Parliament

== Electoral boundaries ==
The report of the Electoral Boundaries Review Committee (EBRC) for the 2001 general election was published on 17 October 2001, only a day before the dissolution of Parliament. The 10th Parliament was to return 84 elected Members of Parliament, comprising nine single member constituencies (SMCs), nine five-member group representation constituencies (GRCs) and five six-member GRCs, with all previous four-member GRCs eliminated.

The election saw the introduction of Holland–Bukit Panjang GRC, Jurong GRC (restructured from most of Bukit Timah GRC, with Bukit Timah itself restored as an SMC) and Pasir Ris–Punggol GRC (renamed from Pasir Ris GRC and expanded to include the Punggol and Sengkang areas from the dissolved Cheng San GRC). Bukit Timah GRC, Cheng San GRC and Kreta Ayer–Tanglin GRC were dissolved and their divisions reorganised into new constituencies.

Two SMCs, Bukit Timah and Joo Chiat, were reinstated, while Boon Lay, Bukit Gombak and Kampong Glam were absorbed into neighbouring GRCs. For the first time, certain GRCs retained their exact boundaries and seat counts from the previous election, specifically Bishan–Toa Payoh GRC and Marine Parade GRC, a pattern that has since recurred in subsequent elections.

Constituency	Changes
Aljunied GRC	Absorbed the southern Punggol divisions from Cheng San GRC, and Lorong Halus area/Paya Lebar Air Base from Pasir Ris GRC; Kampong Kembangan division was split into Aljunied-Kembangan and Kembangan-Punggol divisions (the latter absorbed with Punggol East from Cheng San GRC), while Punggol South division was renamed to Aljunied–Hougang; Carved out Changi-Simei division to East Coast GRC and Aljunied division to Marine Parade GRC
Ang Mo Kio GRC	Ward upsized to six members Absorbed Cheng San and Jalan Kayu divisions from Cheng San GRC; Ang Mo Kio division was absorbed into Yio Chu Kang and Teck Ghee divisions
East Coast GRC	Absorbed Changi-Simei division from Aljunied GRC; Carved out Joo Chiat division into SMC
Holland–Bukit Panjang GRC	New Constituency; Formed with Ulu Pandan, Bukit Panjang and Buona Vista divisions from Bukit Timah GRC, Sembawang GRC and Tanjong Pagar GRC, respectively Bukit Panjang divisions was split to include Cashew and Zhenghua divisions, while some of Zhenghua division was split from Tanglin division
Hong Kah GRC	Absorbed Bukit Gombak SMC, and a portion of Chua Chu Kang SMC (to form Keat Hong division); Carved out Hong Kah East division to Jurong GRC; Hong Kah West was merged into Nanyang division
Jalan Besar GRC	Ward upsized to five members Absorbed Kampong Glam SMC, Kreta Ayer and Kim Seng divisions (which would merge into Kreta Ayer–Kim Seng division) from Kreta Ayer–Tanglin GRC; Geylang West division was absorbed into Kolam Ayer and Jalan Besar divisions
Jurong GRC	New Constituency; Formed from a majority of Bukit Timah GRC (except for Bukit Timah division, which carved into SMC), and Hong Kah East division from Hong Kah GRC; Jurong division was split into Pioneer and Taman Jurong divisions, while Bukit Batok East division was formed from portions of Bukit Batok, Bukit Gombak & Bukit Timah divisions
Pasir Ris–Punggol GRC	New Constituency; Formed from Pasir Ris GRC (except for the Pasir Ris South division, which was absorbed into Tampines GRC) and northern Punggol divisions of Cheng San GRC (Punggol Central, North and South)
Sembawang GRC	Carved out Nee Soon East division into SMC, and Bukit Panjang division into Holland–Bukit Panjang GRC; Sembawang and Woodlands division were split to include Canberra and Admiralty divisions respectively
Tampines GRC	Ward upsized to five members Absorbed Pasir Ris South division from Pasir Ris GRC (renamed to Tampines North)
Tanjong Pagar GRC	Absorbed Moulmein and Tanglin (renamed to Tanglin-Cairnhill) divisions from Kreta Ayer–Tanglin GRC; Carved out Buona Vista division to Holland–Bukit Panjang GRC; Leng Kee division was absorbed into Queenstown, Radin Mas and Tanglin-Cairnhill divisions
West Coast GRC	Ward upsized to five members Absorbed Boon Lay SMC and some of Bukit Timah GRC (Jurong, Joo Koon, Gul Circle and Tuas); Pasir Panjang division was dissolved into Telok Blangah and West Coast divisions

=== Nomination centres ===
Following the issuance of the Writ of Election, nine schools and one public building, for a total of ten, were designated as nomination centres:

Nomination centre	Electoral division(s)
Fuhua Primary School	Bukit Timah SMC; Hong Kah GRC^{M} Jurong GRC^{M}
Greenwood Primary School	Nee Soon Central SMC; Nee Soon East SMC; Sembawang GRC^{IO}
Kent Ridge Secondary School	Ayer Rajah SMC^{M} West Coast GRC^{IO}
Ngee Ann Primary School	MacPherson SMC; Marine Parade GRC^{M} Potong Pasir SMC
Poi Ching School	Aljunied GRC^{M} Tampines GRC^{M}
Singapore Conference Hall	Jalan Besar GRC^{M} Tanjong Pagar GRC^{IO}
Temasek Primary School	East Coast GRC^{M} Joo Chiat SMC
Townsville Primary School	Ang Mo Kio GRC^{IO} Bishan-Toa Payoh GRC^{IO}
West View Primary School	Chua Chu Kang SMC; Holland-Bukit Panjang GRC^{IO}
White Sands Primary School	Hougang SMC; Pasir Ris-Punggol GRC^{M}

- A ^{M} indicates a GRC requires a Malay/Muslim minority candidate, while ^{IO} indicates a GRC requires an Indian or other minority candidate.

As of the latest 2025 election, this was the last known instance where a public building was used as a designated nomination center; subsequent elections would continue to use nine schools as nomination centers.

== MPs not standing for re-election ==
24 incumbent MPs retired before the election was announced, which include Bernard Chen, Richard Hu, Ker Sin Tze and Aline Wong; according to Hu, he had originally planned to stand for Holland–Bukit Panjang GRC but ultimately did not do so.

MP	Party	Constituency	Elected in
Bernard Chen	PAP	West Coast GRC	1977
Kenneth Chen	PAP	Hong Kah GRC	1991
Peter Chen	PAP	Hong Kah GRC	1997
Chng Hee Kok	PAP	East Coast GRC	1984
Goh Chee Wee	PAP	Boon Lay SMC	1980
Goh Choon Kang	PAP	Marine Parade GRC	1984
Harun Abdul Ghani	PAP	Hong Kah GRC	1991
Heng Chiang Meng	PAP	Cheng San GRC	1984
Ho Tat Kin	PAP	Bishan–Toa Payoh GRC	1984
Richard Hu	PAP	Kreta Ayer–Tanglin GRC	1984
Ibrahim Othman	PAP	Bishan–Toa Payoh GRC	1984
Ker Sin Tze	PAP	Aljunied GRC	1991
Lew Syn Pau	PAP	Kreta Ayer–Tanglin GRC	1988
Ow Chin Hock	PAP	Tanjong Pagar GRC	1976
Peh Chin Hua	PAP	Jalan Besar GRC	1988
Sidek Saniff	PAP	Aljunied GRC	1976
R. Sinnakaruppan	PAP	Kreta Ayer–Tanglin GRC	1991
Tang Guan Seng	PAP	Ang Mo Kio GRC	1984
Toh See Kiat	PAP	Aljunied GRC	1997
S. Vasoo	PAP	Tanjong Pagar GRC	1984
Wan Soon Bee	PAP	West Coast GRC	1980
Aline Wong	PAP	Tampines GRC	1984
Eugene Yap	PAP	Marine Parade GRC	1979

== New candidates ==
A total of 40 candidates made their political debut in 2001, including 25 from the PAP. Notable newcomers included future Presidents Tharman Shanmugaratnam and Halimah Yacob (Note: Halimah Yacob earlier made a minor political debut in the 1993 Singaporean presidential election as among one of the six assentors to eventual President-elect Ong Teng Cheong.) (both who also stood in Jurong GRC), future cabinet ministers Gan Kim Yong, Indranee Rajah, Maliki Osman, as well as Balaji Sadasivan, Khaw Boon Wan, Raymond Lim, Ng Eng Hen and Vivian Balakrishnan, who were dubbed by the PAP as the "super seven" alongside Shanmugaratnam and backbencher Cedric Foo. Among the 15 new opposition candidates were Chee Siok Chin, sister of SDP leader Chee Soon Juan; Desmond Lim, who would later head the SDA; and Ooi Boon Ewe, who went on to become a perennial candidate in subsequent elections.

New candidate	Party	Constituency
Ahmad Khalis Abdul Ghani	PAP	Hong Kah GRC
Balaji Sadasivan	PAP	Ang Mo Kio GRC
Chee Siok Chin	SDP	Jurong GRC
Chong Weng Chiew	PAP	Tanjong Pagar GRC
Arthur Fong	PAP	West Coast GRC
Fong Chin Leong	SDA	Jalan Besar GRC
Cedric Foo	PAP	West Coast GRC
Foo Kok Wah	SDA	Tampines GRC
Gan Kim Yong	PAP	Holland–Bukit Panjang GRC
Halimah Yacob	PAP	Jurong GRC
Ho Geok Choo	PAP	West Coast GRC
Indranee Rajah	PAP	Tanjong Pagar GRC
Khaw Boon Wan	PAP	Tanjong Pagar GRC
Amy Khor	PAP	Hong Kah GRC
Warren Lee	PAP	Sembawang GRC
Arthero Lim	SDP	Hong Kah GRC
Bryan Lim	SDP	Hong Kah GRC
Desmond Lim	SDA	Jalan Besar GRC
Raymond Lim	PAP	East Coast GRC
Eric Low	PAP	Hougang SMC
Penny Low	PAP	Pasir Ris–Punggol GRC
Maliki Osman	PAP	Sembawang GRC
Mohamed Isa Abdul Aziz	SDP	Jurong GRC
Mohd Rahizan Yaacob	SDA	Jalan Besar GRC
Ng Eng Hen	PAP	Bishan–Toa Payoh GRC
Irene Ng	PAP	Tampines GRC
Ng Kee How	SDA	Jalan Besar GRC
Ong Seh Hong	PAP	Aljunied GRC
Ooi Boon Ewe	Independent	Joo Chiat SMC
Cynthia Phua	PAP	Aljunied GRC
Poh Lee Guan	WP	Nee Soon East SMC
Sitoh Yih Pin	PAP	Potong Pasir SMC
Tan Kim Chuang	Independent	Bukit Timah SMC
Sebastian Teo	SDA	Tampines GRC
Tharman Shanmugaratnam	PAP	Jurong GRC
Tong Meng Chye	SDA	Bukit Timah SMC
Vivian Balakrishnan	PAP	Holland–Bukit Panjang GRC
Vincent Yeo	SDP	Jurong GRC
Wee Siew Kim	PAP	Ang Mo Kio GRC
Zainudin Nordin	PAP	Bishan–Toa Payoh GRC

== Results ==
The PAP won a landslide victory, marking its best performance since 1980 and its third highest result since it first gained power in 1959. The PAP secured 75.29% of the vote, reflecting strong public support for its leadership during a period of global uncertainty and economic recession. However, this election also recorded the highest number of walkovers since 1968, reflecting the opposition's unwillingness to mount a serious challenge against the PAP that year. Chong Weng Chiew and Penny Low of the PAP became the first MPs born in post-independence Singapore.

At the time, political apathy among Singaporeans towards a stronger opposition presence in Parliament appeared to be high, with only 29 out of 84 seats contested and the opposition narrowly winning just two of them. While the opposition-held constituencies of Hougang and Potong Pasir from the previous election were retained, both saw reduced majorities, each garnering less than 55% of the vote for the WP and the SDA respectively. The outcome raised concerns that an all-PAP elected Parliament and an "opposition wipeout" for the first time since 1980, which was the PAP's justification of introducing the Non-Constituency Member of Parliament (NCMP) scheme in 1984, was a distinct possibility. With two opposition seats in Parliament, a NCMP seat was offered to and accepted by Steve Chia of the SDA, making him the first NCMP since the scheme's introduction to not be from the WP.

Two candidates, Tan Kim Chuang and Tan Lead Shake, forfeited their $13,000 election deposits. The latter was involved in a straight fight in which Tan Cheng Bock recorded the election's highest contested result of 87.96% in Ayer Rajah SMC.

Popular vote
1. PAP (75.3%)
2. SDA (12.0%)
3. SDP (8.09%)
4. WP (3.05%)
5. Others (1.53%)
Elected seats won
1. 55 seats (PAP; uncontested) (65.5%)
2. 27 seats (PAP; contested) (32.1%)
3. 1 seat (SDA) (1.19%)
4. 1 seat (WP) (1.19%)

Party	Votes	%	+/–	Seats	+/–
People's Action Party	470,765	75.29	+10.31	82	+1
Singapore Democratic Alliance	75,248	12.03	+2.95	2	+1
Singapore Democratic Party	50,607	8.09	–2.53	0	0
Workers' Party	19,060	3.05	–11.12	1	0
Democratic Progressive Party	5,334	0.85	+0.15	0	0
Independents	4,253	0.68	+0.23	0	0
Total	625,267	100.00	–	85	+1
Valid votes	625,267	97.87			
Invalid/blank votes	13,636	2.13			
Total votes	638,903	100.00			
Registered voters/turnout	2,036,923	94.61			
Source: Singapore Elections

Opposition parties contested vote
Party	Votes
WP	34.29%
SDA	27.61%
SDP	20.36%
DPP	14.33%
Independents	9.85%

=== By constituency ===
Constituency	Seats	Electorate	Party	Candidates	Votes	%
Aljunied GRC	5	125,115	People's Action Party	Ong Seh Hong; Yeo Guat Kwang; George Yeo; Cynthia Phua; Zainul Abidin	Uncontested	
Ang Mo Kio GRC	6	166,644	People's Action Party	Lee Hsien Loong; Inderjit Singh; Balaji Sadasivan; Seng Han Thong; Tan Boon Wan; Wee Siew Kim	Uncontested	
Ayer Rajah SMC	1	18,475	People's Action Party	Tan Cheng Bock	15,024	87.96
Ayer Rajah SMC	1	18,475	Democratic Progressive Party	Tan Lead Shake	2,057	12.04
Bishan–Toa Payoh GRC	5	114,621	People's Action Party	Wong Kan Seng; Ng Eng Hen; Davinder Singh; Leong Horn Kee; Zainudin Nordin	Uncontested	
Bukit Timah SMC	1	26,951	People's Action Party	Wang Kai Yuen	19,121	77.37
Bukit Timah SMC	1	26,951	Singapore Democratic Alliance	Tong Meng Chye	4,376	17.71
Bukit Timah SMC	1	26,951	Independent	Tan Kim Chuang	1,215	4.92
Chua Chu Kang SMC	1	24,863	People's Action Party	Low Seow Chay	15,349	65.34
Chua Chu Kang SMC	1	24,863	Singapore Democratic Alliance	Steve Chia (Note: Elected as NCMP.)	8,143	34.66
East Coast GRC	6	144,012	People's Action Party	Lee Yock Suan; S. Jayakumar; Abdullah Tarmugi; Chew Heng Ching; Raymond Lim; Tan Soo Khoon	Uncontested	
Holland–Bukit Panjang GRC	5	118,834	People's Action Party	Gan Kim Yong; Lim Swee Say; David Lim; Teo Ho Pin; Vivian Balakrishnan	Uncontested	
Hong Kah GRC	5	129,073	People's Action Party	Ang Mong Seng; Ahmad Khalis Abdul Ghani; John Chen; Amy Khor; Yeo Cheow Tong	96,450	79.74
Hong Kah GRC	5	129,073	Singapore Democratic Party	Cheo Chai Chen; Bryan Lim; Lim Tung Hee; Sarry Hassan; Wong Hong Toy	24,513	20.26
Hougang SMC	1	23,320	Workers' Party	Low Thia Khiang	12,070	54.98
Hougang SMC	1	23,320	People's Action Party	Eric Low	9,882	45.02
Jalan Besar GRC	5	100,268	People's Action Party	Lee Boon Yang; Loh Meng See; Lily Neo; Heng Chee How; Yaacob Ibrahim	68,309	74.48
Jalan Besar GRC	5	100,268	Singapore Democratic Alliance	Fong Chin Leong; Lim Bak Chuan; Mohd Rahizan Yaacob; Ng Kee How; Sin Kek Tong	23,391	25.51
Joo Chiat SMC	1	21,745	People's Action Party	Chan Soo Sen	15,426	83.55
Joo Chiat SMC	1	21,745	Independent	Ooi Boon Ewe	3,038	16.45
Jurong GRC	5	115,113	People's Action Party	Tharman Shanmugaratnam; Foo Yee Shoon; Halimah Yacob; Lim Boon Heng; Ong Chit Chung	84,742	79.75
Jurong GRC	5	115,113	Singapore Democratic Party	Chee Siok Chin; Chee Soon Juan; Gandhi Ambalam; Mohamed Isa Abdul Aziz; Vincent Yeo	21,511	20.25
MacPherson SMC	1	22,010	People's Action Party	Matthias Yao	16,870	83.73
MacPherson SMC	1	22,010	Democratic Progressive Party	Tan Soo Phuan	3,277	16.27
Marine Parade GRC	6	140,174	People's Action Party	'Goh Chok Tong'; Gan Lai Chiang; Mohamad Maidin Packer; Othman Haron Eusofe; R Ravindran; Lim Hwee Hua	Uncontested	
Nee Soon Central SMC	1	22,975	People's Action Party	Ong Ah Heng	16,755	78.52
Nee Soon Central SMC	1	22,975	Singapore Democratic Party	Ling How Doong	4,583	21.48
Nee Soon East SMC	1	28,465	People's Action Party	Ho Peng Kee	19,566	73.68
Nee Soon East SMC	1	28,465	Workers' Party	Poh Lee Guan	6,990	26.32
Pasir Ris–Punggol GRC	5	134,151	People's Action Party	Teo Chee Hean; Ahmad Magad; Charles Chong; Michael Lim; Penny Low	Uncontested	
Potong Pasir SMC	1	16,616	Singapore Democratic Alliance	Chiam See Tong	8,107	52.43
Potong Pasir SMC	1	16,616	People's Action Party	Sitoh Yih Pin	7,356	47.57
Sembawang GRC	6	166,137	People's Action Party	Chin Tet Yung; Hawazi Daipi; K. Shanmugam; Warren Lee; Maliki Osman; Tony Tan	Uncontested	
Tampines GRC	5	125,432	People's Action Party	Mah Bow Tan; Irene Ng; Ong Kian Min; Sin Boon Ann; Yatiman Yusof	85,915	73.34
Tampines GRC	5	125,432	Singapore Democratic Alliance	Abdul Rahim Osman; Foo Kok Wah; Neo Ting Wei; Sebastian Teo; Yip Yew Weng	31,231	26.66
Tanjong Pagar GRC	6	141,150	People's Action Party	Lee Kuan Yew; Chay Wai Chuen; Chong Weng Chiew; Indranee Rajah; Khaw Boon Wan; Koo Tsai Kee	Uncontested	
West Coast GRC	5	110,779	People's Action Party	Lim Hng Kiang; Arthur Fong; Cedric Foo; Ho Geok Choo; S. Iswaran	Uncontested	
Source: ELD

=== By Community Development Council ===
The 2001 election was the first election with a unified format with five CDCs that have been used till this day. The South West CDC have the most number of candidates fielded in the election, with West Coast GRC being the only constituency for the CDC to be elected as a walkover; nonetheless, South West had the highest contested vote share by CDC. While only one constituency in the Central Singapore CDC had a contest, which is Jalan Besar GRC, the CDC with the fewest contested seats was the North West CDC, with only two, while South East CDC had the next fewest number of seats being contested, with three. The lowest-scoring CDC this election was the North East CDC, being the only CDC polling under 70% of the PAP contested vote. It was the only election where Potong Pasir SMC was districted in the South East CDC, before being redistricted to the Central CDC starting in the next election.

Of the opposition vote share, the other parties outside the largest opposition SDA (including the WP) contributed a combined 12.68% of the overall popular vote, in contrast with SDA's 12.03%.

==== Votes polled ====
District				
District	PAP	SDA	SDP	Others
Central	74.49%	25.51%		
Northeast	68.87%	22.45%		8.68%
Northwest	75.84%		9.57%	14.59%
Southeast	73.33%	14.99%		11.68%
Southwest	78.87%	4.28%	15.73%	1.12%
TOTAL	75.29%	12.03%	8.09%	4.58%

==== Seats won ====
District	Seats				
District	Seats	PAP	SDA	SDP	Others
Central	22	22	0		
Northeast	16	15	0		1
Northwest	13	13		0	0
Southeast	14	13	1		0
Southwest	18	18	0	0	0
TOTAL	84	82	1	0	1

=== Analysis ===
==== Top five best PAP performers ====
- Constituencies with no comparison to 1997 were either due to them being new constituencies or the constituencies experiencing walkovers in the last election.

#	Constituency	People's Action Party			Opposition			
#	Constituency	Votes	%	Swing		Votes	%	Swing
1	Ayer Rajah SMC	15,024	87.96	▲14.79	Democratic Progressive Party	2,057	12.04	▼14.79
2	MacPherson SMC	16,870	83.73	▲18.59	Democratic Progressive Party	3,277	16.27	▼18.59
3	Joo Chiat SMC	15,426	83.55	New	Independent	3,038	16.45	New
4	Jurong GRC	84,742	79.75	New	Singapore Democratic Party	21,511	20.25	New
5	Hong Kah GRC	96,450	79.74	▲10.74	Singapore Democratic Party	24,513	20.26	▼10.74

==== Top five best opposition performers ====
- Constituencies with no comparison to 1997 were either due to them being new constituencies or the constituencies experiencing walkovers in the last election.

Constituency		Opposition				People's Action Party		
Constituency		Votes		%	Swing	Votes	%	Swing
1	Hougang SMC	Workers' Party	12,070	54.98	▼3.04	9,882	45.02	▲3.04
2	Potong Pasir SMC	Singapore Democratic Alliance	8,107	52.43	▼2.72	7,356	47.57	▲2.72
3	Chua Chu Kang SMC	Singapore Democratic Alliance	8,143	34.66	▼3.42	15,349	65.34	▲3.42
4	Tampines GRC	Singapore Democratic Alliance	31,231	26.66	Walkover	85,915	73.34	Walkover
5	Nee Soon East SMC	Workers' Party	6,990	26.32	New	19,566	73.68	New

==== Top five Vote Swings ====
- Only the following constituencies may be compared with 1997 results as they existed in both elections, although most had changes in their electoral boundaries.

Constituency		People's Action Party			Opposition			
Constituency		1997 %	2001 %	Swing	Party contesting	1997 %	2001 %	Swing
1	MacPherson SMC	65.14%	83.73%	▲18.59%	Democratic Progressive Party	34.86%	12.27%	▼18.59%
2	Nee Soon Central SMC	61.33%	78.52%	▲17.19%	Singapore Democratic Party	38.67%	21.48%	▼17.19%
3	Ayer Rajah SMC	73.17%	87.96%	▲14.79%	Democratic Progressive Party	26.83%	12.04%	▼14.79%
4	Hong Kah GRC	69.00%	79.74%	▲10.74%	Singapore Democratic Party	31.00%	20.26%	▼10.74%
5	Jalan Besar GRC	67.55%	74.48%	▲6.93%	Singapore Democratic Alliance	32.45%	25.52%	▼6.93%

== Aftermath ==
=== Chee–Goh hawker centre incident ===
During the campaigning period on 28 October, SDP leader Chee Soon Juan drew widespread public attention after an encounter with Prime Minister Goh Chok Tong at a hawker centre in Hong Kah. Using a megaphone, Chee shouted at Goh, "Where is the $17 billion that you have lent to Suharto?" Later that day at an election rally in Nee Soon Central, Chee referenced Lee Kuan Yew, who was serving as Senior Minister at the time. He concluded his speech with: "...I want to ask Mr Lee Kuan Yew ... So Mr Lee Kuan Yew, I challenge you, tell us about the $17 billion you loaned to Suharto."

In the aftermath of the 1997 Asian financial crisis, Singapore provided substantial financial assistance to Indonesia through billions of dollars in loans to stabilise the struggling Indonesian economy, with the country also seeing increasing civil unrest. The Singaporean government considered these loans necessary, as an unstable Indonesia was viewed as potentially having serious negative repercussions for Singapore.

Goh and Lee later filed defamation suits against Chee shortly after the election. Chee lost the lawsuit in 2002 as well as his appeals in 2003 and was ordered to pay damages of S$300,000 to Goh and S$200,000 to Lee. Ahead of the 2006 general election, Chee was declared bankrupt on 10 February, rendering him ineligible to contest. He eventually returned to electoral politics in 2015 after being discharged from bankruptcy in 2012.

=== DPP's expulsions ===
Following the election, the DPP announced the expulsion of Tan Soo Phuan and his son Tan Lead Shake from the party for breaching party directives. Tan Soo Phuan failed to inform the party of his decision to contest MacPherson SMC, while Tan Lead Shake ran in Ayer Rajah SMC instead of the designated Joo Chiat SMC. The DPP subsequently become dormant following the expulsions.
