= 1997 Singaporean general election =

- 2 January 1997

All 83 directly elected seats in Parliament (and up to 3 NCMPs)
- Registered: 1,881,011 (Note: 1,115,679 of the 1,881,011 voters were registered in uncontested constituencies, leaving 765,332 voters able to vote.)
- Turnout: 95.91% (▲0.88pp)
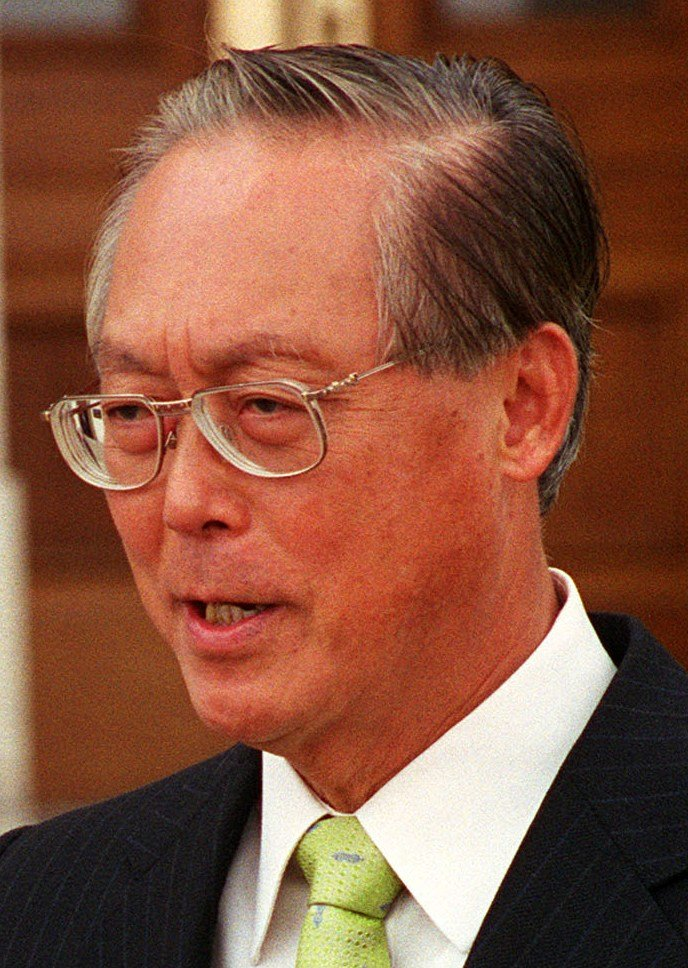

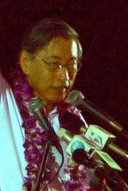
	First party	Second party	Third party
Leader	Goh Chok Tong	J. B. Jeyaretnam	Chiam See Tong
Party	PAP	WP	SPP
Leader's seat	Marine Parade GRC	Ran in Cheng San GRC (won as NCMP)	Potong Pasir SMC
Last election	60.97%, 77 seats	14.29%, 1 seat	Did not exist
Seats won	81	2	1
Seat change	▲4	▲1	New
Popular vote	465,751	101,544	16,746
Percentage	64.98%	14.17%	2.34%
Swing	▲4.01pp	▼0.12pp	New
- Results by constituency
Prime Minister before election
Goh Chok Tong
PAP
Prime Minister after election
Goh Chok Tong
PAP

General elections were held in Singapore on 2 January 1997 to elect members of Parliament. They were the tenth general elections since the introduction of self-government in 1959 and the eighth since independence in 1965. The number of parliamentary seats increased from 81 to 83 following adjustments to electoral boundaries. The 1997 election was the only one to span two calendar years, with nomination day held on 23 December 1996 and polling day on 2 January 1997.

Continuing a trend of the campaigning topics including housing prices and HDB upgrading schemes, the election also featured campaigning in terms of race and religion, election integrity and democracy in the Parliament of Singapore. Campaigning was especially featured in the Cheng San GRC, where WP's secretary-general J. B. Jeyaretnam, after a gap of two elections, fielded his A-team to contest there.

For only the second consecutive election and third overall in history, the People's Action Party (PAP) returned to power on nomination day after 47 seats were elected uncontested, leaving 36 seats up for contest. The PAP had its popular vote share increased for the first time since 1980, with five percentage points compared to the 1991 election. The Singapore Democratic Party (SDP), now led by Chee Soon Juan following a fallout with its predecessor leader Chiam See Tong in 1993, ended up losing their representation in Parliament after Chiam left SDP to join Singapore People's Party (SPP), as well as PAP reclaiming SDP-held Bukit Gombak and Nee Soon Central SMCs, leaving the oppositions with two elected MPs, SPP's Chiam in Potong Pasir SMC, and Low Thia Khiang of the Workers' Party (WP) in Hougang SMC. One Non-constituency Member of Parliament (NCMP) seat was offered to WP, and was accepted by Jeyaretnam, making his return to parliament since 1986, albeit as a NCMP. Despite WP had more nominal seats, the SPP still remained as the biggest opposition party in the upcoming parliament, with Chiam reinstating as the de facto opposition leader since 1994.

== Background ==
This election was Goh Chok Tong's opportunity as prime minister to secure a stronger mandate after the PAP's relatively weaker performance in 1991. Despite retaining a supermajority and continuing the de facto one party rule of Singapore following Lee Kuan Yew stepping down as prime minister and becoming a senior minister, the PAP's popular vote share had fallen to 61.0%, the lowest it had received since independence, while the opposition held four seats in the 8th Parliament. At dissolution, two seats in Eunos and Toa Payoh GRCs, both under the PAP, were vacated following the death of Tay Eng Soon (Note: Tampines North division of Eunos GRC.) and the resignation of former Deputy Prime Minister Ong Teng Cheong, (Note: Kim Keat division of Toa Payoh GRC.) who stepped down to contest in the 1993 Singaporean presidential election. Ong went on to win the presidency, becoming Singapore's first directly elected President of Singapore. Neither GRCs held by-elections. A third incumbent, Lim Chee Onn, (Note: Joo Chiat division of Marine Parade GRC.) retired from politics ahead of the Marine Parade by-election in 1992, where former Republic of Singapore Navy (RSN) rear admiral Teo Chee Hean succeeded him; according to Lim, he did not stand for the by-election citing health and work reasons.

=== Singapore Democratic Party infighting ===
In 1993 the largest opposition party, the Singapore Democratic Party (SDP), experienced a major internal conflict when party founder and Potong Pasir MP Chiam See Tong clashed with the party's Central Executive Committee (CEC), which included assistant Secretary-General Chee Soon Juan as well as chairman and Bukit Gombak MP Ling How Doong, over Chee's behaviour. The CEC supported Chee, and Chiam resigned from the Secretary-General post of his own party. He remained in the SDP for a time, successfully blocking an attempted expulsion by the CEC through a court case on procedural grounds, before resigning on his own accord in 1996 shortly before the general election to join the Singapore People's Party (SPP), a splinter group formed in 1994 by members of the SDP who backed him.

Shortly after taking control of the SDP as its Secretary-General, Chee traveled abroad to speak to foreign media, especially in Western countries, about what he saw as "limits to democracy" in Singapore. He also published his second book, Dare to Change: An Alternative Vision for Singapore, criticising the PAP government and its ministers. In response to criticisms of his book by then deputy prime minister Lee Hsien Loong, Chee wrote a letter to The Straits Times. Marine Parade GRC MP Matthias Yao replied, sparking a two-month exchange of letters in the newspaper that concluded with Chee challenging Yao to contest him in a SMC at the next general election. Prime Minister Goh Chok Tong agreed to separate Yao's MacPherson division from Marine Parade GRC at this general election so that he could accept the challenge.

Ultimately, although Chiam had initially invited Chee to the SDP, they clashed over personality and approach. He opposed Chee's confrontational style and harsh criticism of the PAP especially when done abroad, which he considered counterintuitive to the SDP's cause and opposition politics in general, particularly since Chee did not hold a seat in Parliament and voiced his criticisms from outside the House and the country.

== Timeline ==
Date	Event
21 November 1996	Publication of Electoral Boundaries report
16 December 1996	Dissolution of 8th Parliament
23 December 1996	Nomination Day
2 January	Polling day
15 January	Announcement of Non-constituency Member of Parliament
26 May	Opening of 9th Parliament

== Nominations and campaigning ==
The 8th Parliament was dissolved on 16 December 1996, with nominations held a week later. At the close of nominations, 122 candidates were fielded, and the PAP secured a return to power for the second consecutive and third overall election in which a majority of seats were uncontested. In total, 47 seats went uncontested, including Tampines GRC, where the National Solidarity Party (NSP) team was disqualified after one candidate, Sarry Hassan, was found to have been struck off the electoral rolls for failing to vote in 1991.

=== Cheng San GRC controversy ===
During the campaigning period, Tang Liang Hong, who stood on the Workers' Party (WP) ticket alongside its Secretary-General J. B. Jeyaretnam in Cheng San GRC, came under heavy attack by the governing PAP. The PAP accused Tang of being an "anti-Christian Chinese chauvinist", which became a major controversy of the election and shaped much of the national debate during the campaign.

== Electoral boundaries ==
The number of seats were increased from 81 to 83 and while most of the constituencies were changed, the Single Member Constituencies saw a drastic change where 14 SMCs were dissolved into Group Representation Constituencies (GRC), leaving with just nine seats on the map. Only four SMCs (Ayer Rajah, Bukit Gombak, Hougang, Potong Pasir) have its boundaries intact.

For the first time ever, GRCs now have a double-barrelled name and carries a size between four and six seats. In total, six GRCs were dissolved in this election, and six new ones were created, which include Bishan–Toa Payoh, Kreta Ayer–Tanglin and East Coast GRCs, as well as Bukit Timah GRC which was upgraded from a Bukit Timah SMC (Kampong Glam reverted back to a SMC), and Pasir Ris GRC following the dissolution of Brickworks and Eunos GRCs respectively. Sembawang GRC had an increase of the seat count despite the boundaries were also left untouched.

Constituency	Changes
Aljunied GRC	Ward upsized to five members Absorbed Eunos from Eunos GRC, Changkat South division from Tampines GRC (renamed to Changi-Simei), and portions of Serangoon Gardens division from Thomson GRC
Ang Mo Kio GRC	Ward upsized to five members Absorbed Nee Soon South SMC, portions of Chong Boon division from Cheng San GRC, and portions of Serangoon Gardens division from Thomson GRC
Bishan–Toa Payoh GRC	New Constituency; Formed with Thomson GRC (and a small portion of Serangoon Gardens division) and Toa Payoh GRC, with Boon Teck and Kim Keat divisions absorbed to Toa Payoh Central division, and Kuo Chuan to Toa Payoh East division
Bukit Timah GRC	New Constituency; Formed with Bukit Batok, Bukit Timah, Jurong, Ulu Pandan and Yuhua SMCs, and parts of Clementi division from Brickworks GRC
Cheng San GRC	Ward upsized to five members Punggol division was split into Punggol Central, Punggol East and Punggol South divisions Carved out Chong Boon division to Ang Mo Kio GRC and Cheng San division
East Coast GRC	New Constituency; Absorbed Joo Chiat division from Marine Parade GRC, Kaki Bukit division from Eunos GRC, Changi SMC and Bedok GRC; Changi division was absorbed into Changi-Simei and Siglap divisions
Hong Kah GRC	Ward upsized to five members Absorbed a portion of Chua Chu Kang SMC (forming Yew Tee division) and Jurong SMC; Hong Kah West division was split to include Nanyang division (which also absorbed a portion of Jurong SMC)
Jalan Besar GRC	Kallang division was dissolved into Kolam Ayer, Jalan Besar, Whampoa and Kampong Glam wards
Kreta Ayer–Tanglin GRC	New Constituency; Formed with Kreta Ayer SMC, Tanglin SMC and portions of Kampong Glam GRC (except for Kampong Glam division, which was split into SMC)
Marine Parade GRC	Ward upsized to six members Absorbed Braddell Heights and Mountbatten SMC, and portions of Serangoon Gardens division from Thomson GRC (forming Serangoon division); Carved out MacPherson division into SMC, and Joo Chiat division into East Coast GRC
Pasir Ris GRC	New Constituency; Absorbed Pasir Ris and portions of Tampines North division (renamed to Pasir Ris South) from Eunos GRC, while Pasir Ris division was split into Pasir Ris Central, Pasir Ris East and Pasir Ris Loyang divisions
Sembawang GRC	Ward upzised to six members Bukit Panjang and Sembawang divisions were split to include Marsiling and Woodlands divisions, respectively
Tampines GRC	Tampines West division was split to include Tampines Central division Carved a portion of Changkat South division to Aljunied GRC, while the rest absorbed to Tampines Changkat division
Tanjong Pagar GRC	Ward upsized to six members Absorbed Brickworks and Queenstown division from Brickworks GRC, as well as Bukit Merah, Buona Vista and Leng Kee SMCs; Carved out Telok Blangah division to West Coast GRC; Brickworks division was absorbed into Pasir Panjang & Queenstown divisions
West Coast GRC	New Constituency; Formed with Telok Blangah division from Tanjong Pagar GRC, and Clementi and West Coast divisions from Brickworks GRC

== MPs not standing for re-election ==
17 incumbent PAP MPs retired prior to the polls, including the first Minister-in-Charge of Muslim Affairs Ahmad Mattar, cabinet ministers S. Dhanabalan and Yeo Ning Hong, as well as Ho Kah Leong, leaving Lee Kuan Yew left as the last active MP from the pre-independence Legislative to contest in succeeding elections until 2015.

MP	Party	Constituency	Elected in
Arthur Beng	PAP	Bedok GRC	1984
Ch'ng Jit Koon	PAP	Bukit Merah SMC	1968
S. Chandra Das	PAP	Cheng San GRC	1980
Chin Harn Tong	PAP	Aljunied GRC	1972
S. Dhanabalan	PAP	Toa Payoh GRC	1976
Ho Kah Leong	PAP	Jurong SMC	1966
Koh Lip Lin	PAP	Nee Soon South SMC	1980
Lau Ping Sum	PAP	Ang Mo Kio GRC	1980
Lau Teik Soon	PAP	Thomson GRC	1976
Lee Yiok Seng	PAP	Sembawang GRC	1972
Ahmad Mattar	PAP	Brickworks GRC	1972
Peter Sung	PAP	Buona Vista SMC	1988
Teo Chong Tee	PAP	Changi SMC	1976
Umar Abdul Hamid	PAP	Ang Mo Kio GRC	1991
Wong Kwei Cheong	PAP	Kampong Glam GRC	1980
Yeo Ning Hong	PAP	Kampong Glam GRC	1980
Yeo Toon Chia	PAP	Ang Mo Kio GRC	1970
Zulkifli Mohammed	PAP	Jalan Besar GRC	1984

== New candidates ==
A total of 42 candidates made their election debuts, of which the PAP introduced 24 including its future office holders such as Lim Swee Say, S. Iswaran and Yaacob Ibrahim, as well as the eventual first woman cabinet minister Lim Hwee Hua, and prominent backbencher and mayor Teo Ho Pin among others. Also including in the list was a former Nominated Member of Parliament (NMP) Chia Shi Teck, and Tan Lead Shake, the son of now-Democratic Progressive Party (DPP) (previously known as the Singapore United Front (SUF)) candidate Tan Soon Phuan.

New candidate	Party	Constituency
Abdul Rahim Osman	WP	Cheng San GRC
Ahmad Magad	PAP	Pasir Ris GRC
Ang Mong Seng	PAP	Bukit Gombak SMC
Mike Chan	WP	West Coast GRC
Chan Soo Sen	PAP	East Coast GRC
Peter Chen	PAP	Hong Kah GRC
Chia Shi Teck	Independent	Chua Chu Kang SMC
Steve Chia	NSP	Hong Kah GRC
Chin Tet Yung	PAP	Sembawang GRC
Anthony D' Cruz	WP	West Coast GRC
Gandhi Ambalam	SDP	Jalan Besar GRC
Hawazi Daipi	PAP	Sembawang GRC
Heng Chee How	PAP	Hougang SMC
Huang Seow Kwang	WP	Cheng San GRC
Inderjit Singh	PAP	Ang Mo Kio GRC
S. Iswaran	PAP	West Coast GRC
Patrick Kee	NSP	Hong Kah GRC
S. Kunalen	SDP	Aljunied GRC
David Lim	PAP	Aljunied GRC
Lim Hwee Hua	PAP	Marine Parade GRC
Lim Swee Say	PAP	Tanjong Pagar GRC
Christopher Neo	NSP	Boon Lay SMC
Lily Neo	PAP	Kreta Ayer–Tanglin GRC
Ong Ah Heng	PAP	Nee Soon Central SMC
Ong Kian Min	PAP	Pasir Ris GRC
R. Ravindran	PAP	Bukit Timah GRC
Seng Han Thong	PAP	Ang Mo Kio GRC
Sin Boon Ann	PAP	Tampines GRC
Syed Farid Wajidi	SPP	Bukit Gombak SMC
Tan Boon Wan	PAP	Ang Mo Kio GRC
Tan Lead Shake	DPP	Kampong Glam SMC
Tang Liang Hong	WP	Cheng San GRC
Tay Hoon	SDP	Aljunied GRC
Teo Ho Pin	PAP	Sembawang GRC
Toh See Kiat	PAP	Aljunied GRC
Wong Wee Nam	NSP	Hong Kah GRC
Yaacob Ibrahim	PAP	Jalan Besar GRC
Yadzeth Hairis	NSP	Hong Kah GRC
Yeo Guat Kwang	PAP	Cheng San GRC
Yip Yew Weng	NSP	Chua Chu Kang SMC
Zainul Abidin	PAP	Cheng San GRC

== Results ==
On Polling Day, several PAP ministers, including Goh Chok Tong, Tony Tan and Lee Hsien Loong, were present within the precinct of polling stations in Cheng San GRC even though they were not candidates in the constituency. The WP argued that this was a violation of the Parliamentary Elections Act, as unauthorised personnel are prohibited from polling stations under election law to prevent undue influence and harassment of voters and staff.

The voter turnout in contested constituencies was 95.91%, the highest recorded in Singapore's electoral history. Kampong Glam's PAP candidate Loh Meng See achieved the best result of the election with 74.52% of the valid votes. Only two candidates, Tan Soo Phuan of the DPP and Syed Farid Wajidi of the SPP, forfeited their election deposits. This election was also the last general election to feature a four-cornered contest in one of its constituencies until the 2025 election, not counting the 2011 Singaporean presidential election or the 2013 Punggol East by-election, which were also four-cornered contests.

Popular vote
1. PAP (65.0%)
2. WP (14.2%)
3. SDP (10.6%)
4. NSP (6.74%)
5. Others (3.49%)
Elected seats won
1. 47 seats (PAP; uncontested) (56.6%)
2. 34 seats (PAP; contested) (41.0%)
3. 1 seat (SPP) (1.20%)
4. 1 seat (WP) (1.20%)

Party	Votes	%	+/–	Seats	+/–
People's Action Party	465,751	64.98	+4.01	81	+4
Workers' Party	101,544	14.17	–0.12	2	+1
Singapore Democratic Party	76,129	10.62	–1.36	0	–3
National Solidarity Party	48,322	6.74	–0.57	0	0
Singapore People's Party	16,746	2.34	New	1	New
Democratic Progressive Party	5,043	0.70	New	0	New
Independents	3,210	0.45	–1.41	0	0
Total	716,745	100.00	–	84	+3
Valid votes	716,745	97.65			
Invalid/blank votes	17,255	2.35			
Total votes	734,000	100.00			
Registered voters/turnout	765,332	95.91			
Source: Singapore Elections

Opposition parties contested vote
Party	Votes
WP	37.61%
SDP	33.13%
NSP	30.07%
SPP	27.19%
Independents	14.06%
DPP	12.34%

=== By constituency ===
Constituency	Seats	Electorate	Party	Candidates	Votes	%
Aljunied GRC	5	103,466	People's Action Party	Ker Sin Tze; David Lim; Sidek Saniff; Toh See Kiat; George Yeo	64,299	67.02
Aljunied GRC	5	103,466	Singapore Democratic Party	Aziz Ibrahim; Kwan Yue Keng; S. Kunalen; Tay Hoon; Wong Hong Toy	31,645	32.98
Ang Mo Kio GRC	5	125,344	People's Action Party	Lee Hsien Loong; Seng Han Thong; Inderjit Singh; Tan Boon Wan; Tang Guan Seng	Uncontested	
Ayer Rajah SMC	1	22,025	People's Action Party	Tan Cheng Bock	15,081	73.17
Ayer Rajah SMC	1	22,025	Singapore People's Party	Sin Kek Tong	5,531	26.83
Bishan–Toa Payoh GRC	5	122,256	People's Action Party	Ho Tat Kin; Ibrahim Othman; Leong Horn Kee; Davinder Singh; Wong Kan Seng	Uncontested	
Boon Lay SMC	1	20,014	People's Action Party	Goh Chee Wee	12,407	66.10
Boon Lay SMC	1	20,014	National Solidarity Party	Christopher Neo	6,362	33.90
Bukit Gombak SMC	1	24,909	People's Action Party	Ang Mong Seng	15,229	65.14
Bukit Gombak SMC	1	24,909	Singapore Democratic Party	Ling How Doong	6,643	28.42
Bukit Gombak SMC	1	24,909	Singapore People's Party	Syed Farid Wajidi	1,506	6.44
Bukit Timah GRC	5	118,248	People's Action Party	Foo Yee Shoon; Lim Boon Heng; Ong Chit Chung; R. Ravindran; Wang Kai Yuen	Uncontested	
Cheng San GRC	5	103,323	People's Action Party	Heng Chiang Meng; Lee Yock Suan; Michael Lim; Yeo Guat Kwang; Zainul Abidin	53,553	54.82
Cheng San GRC	5	103,323	Workers' Party	Abdul Rahim Osman; Huang Seow Kwang; J. B. Jeyaretnam (Note: Elected as NCMP.); Tan Bin Seng; Tang Liang Hong	44,132	45.18
Chua Chu Kang SMC	1	24,074	People's Action Party	Low Seow Chay	14,141	61.92
Chua Chu Kang SMC	1	24,074	National Solidarity Party	Yip Yew Weng	5,040	22.07
Chua Chu Kang SMC	1	24,074	Independent	Chia Shi Teck	3,210	14.06
Chua Chu Kang SMC	1	24,074	Democratic Progressive Party	Tan Soo Phuan	445	1.95
East Coast GRC	6	142,201	People's Action Party	Abdullah Tarmugi; Chan Soo Sen; Chew Heng Ching; Chng Hee Kok; S. Jayakumar; Tan Soo Khoon	Uncontested	
Hong Kah GRC	5	125,452	People's Action Party	John Chen; Kenneth Chen; Peter Chen; Harun Abdul Ghani; Yeo Cheow Tong	82,182	69.00
Hong Kah GRC	5	125,452	National Solidarity Party	Steve Chia; Patrick Kee; Tan Chee Kien; Wong Wee Nam; Yadzeth Hairis	36,920	31.00
Hougang SMC	1	24,423	Workers' Party	Low Thia Khiang	13,458	58.02
Hougang SMC	1	24,423	People's Action Party	Heng Chee How	9,736	41.98
Jalan Besar GRC	4	71,922	People's Action Party	Choo Wee Khiang; Lee Boon Yang; Peh Chin Hua; Yaacob Ibrahim	44,840	67.55
Jalan Besar GRC	4	71,922	Singapore Democratic Party	David Chew; Gandhi Ambalam; Jufrie Mahmood; Low Yong Nguan	21,537	32.45
Kampong Glam SMC	1	20,044	People's Action Party	Loh Meng See	13,446	74.52
Kampong Glam SMC	1	20,044	Democratic Progressive Party	Tan Lead Shake	4,598	25.48
Kreta Ayer–Tanglin GRC	4	75,126	People's Action Party	Richard Hu; Lew Syn Pau; Lily Neo; R. Sinnakaruppan	Uncontested	
MacPherson SMC	1	20,734	People's Action Party	Matthias Yao	12,546	65.14
MacPherson SMC	1	20,734	Singapore Democratic Party	Chee Soon Juan	6,713	34.86
Marine Parade GRC	6	142,106	People's Action Party	Goh Chok Tong; Goh Choon Kang; Lim Hwee Hua; Mohamad Maidin Packer; Othman Haron Eusofe; Eugene Yap	Uncontested	
Nee Soon Central SMC	1	26,257	People's Action Party	Ong Ah Heng	15,214	61.33
Nee Soon Central SMC	1	26,257	Singapore Democratic Party	Cheo Chai Chen	9,591	38.67
Pasir Ris GRC	4	85,908	People's Action Party	Ahmad Magad; Charles Chong; Ong Kian Min; Teo Chee Hean	56,907	70.86
Pasir Ris GRC	4	85,908	Workers' Party	A. Balakrishnan; A. Rahim; Lim Chiu Liang; Sim Say Chuan	23,404	29.14
Potong Pasir SMC	1	18,759	Singapore People's Party	Chiam See Tong	9,709	55.15
Potong Pasir SMC	1	18,759	People's Action Party	Andy Gan	7,895	44.85
Sembawang GRC	6	154,402	People's Action Party	Chin Tet Yung; Hawazi Daipi; Ho Peng Kee; K. Shanmugam; Tony Tan; Teo Ho Pin	Uncontested	
Tampines GRC	4	94,476	People's Action Party	Aline Wong; Mah Bow Tan; Sin Boon Ann; Yatiman Yusof	Uncontested	
Tanjong Pagar GRC	6	141,520	People's Action Party	Chay Wai Chuen; Koo Tsai Kee; Lee Kuan Yew; Lim Swee Say; Ow Chin Hock; S. Vasoo	Uncontested	
West Coast GRC	4	74,022	People's Action Party	Bernard Chen; Lim Hng Kiang; S. Iswaran; Wan Soon Bee	48,275	70.14
West Coast GRC	4	74,022	Workers' Party	Mike Chan; Anthony D'Cruz; John Gan; Ng Teck Siong	20,550	29.86
Source: ELD

== Incumbents defeated ==
Incumbent		Constituency	Elected in	Winner	
Name	Party	Constituency	Elected in	Name	Party
Cheo Chai Chen	SDP	Nee Soon Central SMC	1991	Ong Ah Heng	PAP
Ling How Doong	SDP	Bukit Gombak SMC	1991	Ang Mong Seng	PAP

== Aftermath ==
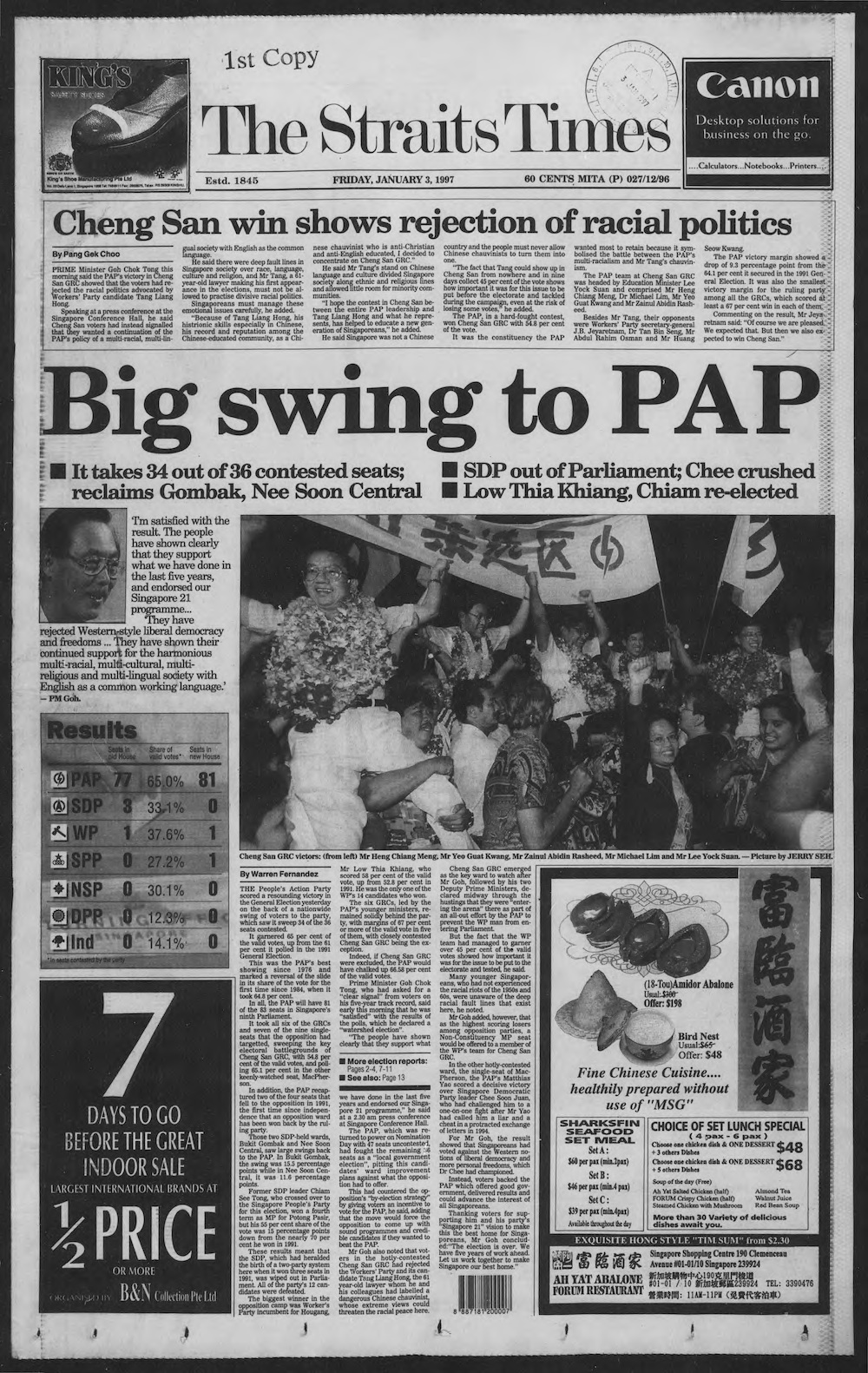
The front page on page 1 of The Straits Times on 3 January

=== Cheng San GRC ===
After the election, the WP candidates at Cheng San GRC filed police reports against the PAP over the presence of PAP ministers within the precinct of polling stations in Cheng San GRC, citing the violation of two sections of the Parliamentary Elections Act:

- Section 82(1)(d): "No person shall wait outside any polling station on polling day, except for the purpose of gaining entry to the polling station to cast his vote".
- Section 82(1)(e): "No person shall loiter in any street or public place within a radius of 200 metres of any polling station on polling day."

Their complaints were not prosecuted by the police, on the advice of the Attorney-General (AG) Chan Sek Keong. Chan, in his letter to the Minister for Law S. Jayakumar, interpreted the statute as being "irrelevant to people" within the polling station, and that remaining within the polling station itself, as opposed to being within a perimeter of 200 meters from the external walls of the polling station, was not an offence. This reading was unconventional because it practically allowed people to stay inside the station, but deemed it an offence to be in the area within 200 metres outside its external walls.

He added that "the possibility of a person inside a polling station influencing or intimidating voters in the presence of the presiding officer and his officials, the polling agents etc was considered so remote that it was discounted by the Act." This logic was also unusual because it suggested that voters were safe from undue influence inside the polling station, yet could be affected simply by being within 200 metres outside.

The WP questioned whether the AG was suggesting that it was acceptable for people to enter and loiter on the grounds of the polling station rather than outside it, and subsequently renewed its call for the establishment of an independent election commission to ensure fair play in the conduct of elections in Singapore.

==== Tang Liang Hong's self-imposed exile ====
After the election, Tang Liang Hong was sued for defamation by several of the PAP's leaders, including then-Prime Minister Goh Chok Tong, then-Senior Minister Lee Kuan Yew and then-Deputy Prime Ministers Lee Hsien Loong and Tony Tan, who accused him of making statements during the campaign which falsely questioned their integrity. A total of 13 judgements were entered against Tang for defamation. Tang left Singapore shortly after the election and moved to Australia. He never returned to Singapore until his death in 2025.

=== Other constituencies ===
With upgrading schemes dangled as a pricy stake for voters living in public housing, the PAP reversed its electoral decline for the first time in four elections with a 4.01% increase in its vote share. This marked the first election since the 1963 general election in which the party managed to wrestle back opposition wards, regaining control of Bukit Gombak and Nee Soon Central, both of which had been captured in the previous election. Due to Chiam See Tong's defection to the SPP, the SDP failed to win any seats, ending its parliamentary presence that had lasted since 1984. The SDP has yet to return to Parliament since then.

The election saw two opposition MPs returned to the legislature, with Chiam representing the SPP and Low Thia Khiang the WP. In addition, one Non-Constituency Member of Parliament (NCMP) seat was offered to the WP team in Cheng San GRC, which was the best performing losing opposition team with 45.2% of the vote. The WP accepted the offer and appointed its Secretary-General J. B. Jeyaretnam as NCMP, marking his return to Parliament for the first time since 1986.

In June 1997, when NMPs were appointed, the number of appointments was increased from six to nine. Later, on 6 September 1999, the 9th Parliament was relocated to the newly constructed Parliament House situated within the Civic District facing North Bridge Road. The former Parliament House was closed following the move and subsequently reopened on 26 March 2004 as The Arts House, repurposed as a venue for the arts and cultural events.
