= 8th Parliament of Singapore =

Singaporean parliamentary meeting

←	7th	9th	→
Composition as of 7 September 1992
Government:
PAP (77)
Opposition:
SDP (3)
WP (1)
NMP (6)

Overview
- Legislative body: Parliament of Singapore
- Meeting place: Old Parliament House
- Term: 6 January 1992 – 16 December 1996 (4 years, 11 months and 10 days)
- Election: 31 August 1991
- Government: People's Action Party
- Opposition: Workers' Party; Singapore Democratic Party

Parliament of Singapore
- Members: 81 + 6 NMPs
- Speaker: Tan Soo Khoon
- Leader of the House: Wong Kan Seng
- Prime Minister: Goh Chok Tong
- Leader of the Opposition: Chiam See Tong (until 17 May 1993); Ling How Doong (from 17 May 1993)
- Party control: PAP supermajority

Sessions
- 1st: 6 January 1992 – 6 December 1993 (1 year and 11 months)
- 2nd: 10 January 1994 – 16 December 1996 (2 years, 11 months and 6 days)

The 8th Parliament of Singapore was a meeting of the Parliament of Singapore. Its first session commenced on 6 January 1992 and was prorogued on 6 December 1993. It commenced its second session on 10 January 1994 and was dissolved on 16 December 1996.

The members of the Eighth Parliament were elected in the 1991 general election. Parliament was controlled by a People's Action Party majority, led by Prime Minister Goh Chok Tong and his Cabinet. Tan Soo Khoon served as Speaker. The de facto Leader of the Opposition was Chiam See Tong until he resigned as secretary-general of the Singapore Democratic Party on 17 May 1993, with SDP chairman Ling How Doong taking his place afterwords.

Businessmen Chia Shi Teck and Robert Chua, surgeon Kanwaljit Soin, physician Toh Keng Kiat, unionist Tong Kok Yeo, and law professor Walter Woon were appointed for two-year terms as Nominated Members of Parliament on 7 September 1992. Soin and Woon would go on to serve another two terms, alongside unionist John de Payva, businessmen Imram Mohamed and Stephen Lee, and academic Lee Tsao Yuan. All six incumbent NMPs would be re-appointed on 7 September 1996 to serve for the remaining three months of the Eighth Parliament.

The Eighth Parliament Lim Chee Onn of Marine Parade GRC, Ong Teng Cheong of Toa Payoh GRC, and Tay Eng Soon of Eunos GRC vacate their seats. Of these three, only Lim's seat was replaced by a by-election, while the other two were left vacant.

With a tenure of around five years, the Eighth Parliament was the longest in Singapore history. With Ng Kah Ting's departure, Senior Minister Lee Kuan Yew became the last MP from the First Parliament to remain in office.

== Results of the 1991 general election ==
Party	Votes	%	Seats	+/–
People's Action Party	477,760	60.97	77	▼3
Workers' Party	112,010	14.29	1	▼1
Singapore Democratic Party	93,856	11.98	3	▲2
National Solidarity Party	57,306	7.31	0	Steady
Singapore Justice Party	15,222	1.94	0	Steady
Singapore Malay National Organisation	12,862	1.64	0	Steady
Independents	14,596	1.86	0	Steady
Total	783,612	100.00	81	▼2
Valid votes	783,612	97.27		
Invalid/blank votes	21,961	2.73		
Total votes	805,573	100.00		
Registered voters/turnout	1,692,384	95.03		
Source: Singapore Elections

== Officeholders ==
- Speaker: Tan Soo Khoon (Bedok GRC, PAP)
- Deputy Speaker:
  - Abdullah Tarmugi (Bedok GRC, PAP), until 30 June 1993
  - Eugene Yap (Mountbatten SMC, PAP), from 26 February 1993
- Prime Minister: Goh Chok Tong (Marine Parade GRC, PAP)
- Deputy Prime Minister:
  - Lee Hsien Loong (Ang Mo Kio GRC, PAP)
  - Ong Teng Cheong (Toa Payoh GRC, PAP), until 16 August 1993
  - Tony Tan (Sembawang GRC, PAP), from 1 August 1995
- Leader of the Opposition:
  - Chiam See Tong (Potong Pasir SMC, SDP), until 17 May 1993
  - Ling How Doong (Bukit Gombak SMC, SDP), from 17 May 1993
- Leader of the House: Wong Kan Seng (Thomson GRC, PAP)
- Government Party Whip: Lee Boon Yang (Jalan Besar GRC, PAP)
- Deputy Government Party Whip:
  - Ho Kah Leong (Jurong SMC, PAP)
  - Ong Chit Chung (Bukit Batok SMC, PAP), from 30 April 1994

== Composition ==
Party	Members	
Party	At election	At dissolution
People's Action Party	77	75
Singapore Democratic Party	3	3
Workers' Party	1	1
Nominated Members of Parliament	0	6
Vacant seats	6	2
Total	87	87
Government majority	73	71

== Members ==
Constituency	Division	Member	Party
Aljunied GRC	Aljunied	Chin Harn Tong 钱翰琮	PAP
Aljunied GRC	Kampong Kembangan	George Yeo 杨荣文	PAP
Aljunied GRC	Kampong Ubi	Maidin Packer ميدين ڤاکر	PAP
Aljunied GRC	Paya Lebar	Ker Sin Tze 柯新治	PAP
Ang Mo Kio GRC	Ang Mo Kio	Yeo Toon Chia 杨敦清	PAP
Ang Mo Kio GRC	Kebun Baru	Umar Abdul Hamid عمر عبد الحميد	PAP
Ang Mo Kio GRC	Teck Ghee	Lee Hsien Loong 李显龙	PAP
Ang Mo Kio GRC	Yio Chu Kang	Lau Ping Sum 刘炳森	PAP
Ayer Rajah SMC		Tan Cheng Bock 陈清木	PAP
Bedok GRC	Bedok	S. Jayakumar எஸ். செயக்குமார்	PAP
Bedok GRC	Fengshan	Arthur Beng 孟建南	PAP
Bedok GRC	Kampong Chai Chee	Tan Soo Khoon 陈树群	PAP
Bedok GRC	Siglap	Abdullah Tarmugi عبد الله تارموعي	PAP
Boon Lay SMC		Goh Chee Wee 吴志伟	PAP
Braddell Heights SMC		Goh Choon Kang 吴俊刚	PAP
Brickworks GRC	Brickworks	Ahmad Mattar أحمد مطر	PAP
Brickworks GRC	Clementi	Bernard Chen 陈天立	PAP
Brickworks GRC	Queenstown	Chay Wai Chuen 谢惠泉	PAP
Brickworks GRC	West Coast	Wan Soon Bee 阮顺美	PAP
Bukit Batok SMC		Ong Chit Chung 翁执中	PAP
Bukit Gombak SMC		Ling How Doong 林孝谆	SDP
Bukit Merah SMC		Ch'ng Jit Koon 庄日昆	PAP
Bukit Timah SMC		Wang Kai Yuen 王家园	PAP
Buona Vista SMC		Peter Sung 宋彼得	PAP
Changi SMC		Teo Chong Tee 张宗治	PAP
Cheng San GRC	Cheng San	Lee Yock Suan 李玉全	PAP
Cheng San GRC	Chong Boon	S. Chandra Das எஸ். சந்திர தாஸ்	PAP
Cheng San GRC	Jalan Kayu	Heng Chiang Meng 王章明	PAP
Cheng San GRC	Punggol	Michael Lim 林俊龙	PAP
Chua Chu Kang SMC		Low Seow Chay 刘绍济	PAP
Eunos GRC	Eunos	Sidek Saniff صديق صانف	PAP
Eunos GRC	Kaki Bukit	Chew Heng Ching 周亨增	PAP
Eunos GRC	Pasir Ris	Charles Chong 张有福	PAP
Eunos GRC	Tampines North	Tay Eng Soon (until 1993) (Note: Tay died on 5 August 1993 from acute heart failure.) 郑永顺	PAP
Hong Kah GRC	Hong Kah East	Kenneth Chen 陈冠立	PAP
Hong Kah GRC	Hong Kah North	John Chen 陈晓朋	PAP
Hong Kah GRC	Hong Kah South	Yeo Cheow Tong 姚照东	PAP
Hong Kah GRC	Hong Kah West	Harun Abdul Ghani هارون عبد الغني	PAP
Hougang SMC		Low Thia Khiang 刘程强	WP
Jalan Besar GRC	Geylang West	Peh Chin Hua 白振华	PAP
Jalan Besar GRC	Jalan Besar	Lee Boon Yang 李文献	PAP
Jalan Besar GRC	Kallang	Choo Wee Khiang 朱为强	PAP
Jalan Besar GRC	Kolam Ayer	Zulkifli Mohammed ذوالکيفلي محمد	PAP
Jurong SMC		Ho Kah Leong 何家良	PAP
Kampong Glam GRC	Cairnhill	Wong Kwei Cheong 黄贵祥	PAP
Kampong Glam GRC	Kampong Glam	Loh Meng See 罗明士	PAP
Kampong Glam GRC	Kim Seng	Yeo Ning Hong 杨林丰	PAP
Kampong Glam GRC	Moulmein	R. Sinnakaruppan ஆர். சின்னக்கருப்பன்	PAP
Kreta Ayer SMC		Richard Hu 胡赐道	PAP
Leng Kee SMC		Ow Chin Hock 欧进福	PAP
Marine Parade GRC	Geylang Serai	Othman Haron Eusofe عثمان هارون يوسف	PAP
Marine Parade GRC	Joo Chiat	Lim Chee Onn (until 1992) (Note: Lim resigned on 1 December 1992 to make way for new talent.) 林子安	PAP
Marine Parade GRC	Joo Chiat	Teo Chee Hean (from 1992) (Note: Teo was elected on 19 December 1992 in the 1992 Marine Parade by-election.) 张志贤	PAP
Marine Parade GRC	MacPherson	Matthias Yao 姚智	PAP
Marine Parade GRC	Marine Parade	Goh Chok Tong 吴作栋	PAP
Mountbatten SMC		Eugene Yap 叶尧清	PAP
Nee Soon Central SMC		Cheo Chai Chen 蒋才正	SDP
Nee Soon South SMC		Koh Lip Lin 高立人	PAP
Potong Pasir SMC		Chiam See Tong 詹时中	SDP
Sembawang GRC	Bukit Panjang	Lee Yiok Seng 李玉胜	PAP
Sembawang GRC	Chong Pang	K. Shanmugam கா. சண்முகம்	PAP
Sembawang GRC	Nee Soon East	Ho Peng Kee 何炳基	PAP
Sembawang GRC	Sembawang	Tony Tan 陈庆炎	PAP
Tampines GRC	Changkat South	Chng Hee Kok 庄熙国	PAP
Tampines GRC	Tampines Changkat	Aline Wong 黄简丽中	PAP
Tampines GRC	Tampines East	Mah Bow Tan 马宝山	PAP
Tampines GRC	Tampines West	Yatiman Yusof ياتيمان يوسف	PAP
Tanglin SMC		Lew Syn Pau 刘信保	PAP
Tanjong Pagar GRC	Radin Mas	S. Vasoo எஸ். வாசு	PAP
Tanjong Pagar GRC	Tanjong Pagar	Lee Kuan Yew 李光耀	PAP
Tanjong Pagar GRC	Telok Blangah	Lim Hng Kiang 林勋强	PAP
Tanjong Pagar GRC	Tiong Bahru	Koo Tsai Kee 顾蔡矶	PAP
Thomson GRC	Bishan East	Wong Kan Seng 黄根成	PAP
Thomson GRC	Bishan North	Ibrahim Othman إبراهيم عثمان	PAP
Thomson GRC	Serangoon Gardens	Lau Teik Soon 刘德顺	PAP
Thomson GRC	Thomson	Leong Horn Kee 梁汉基	PAP
Toa Payoh GRC	Boon Teck	Ho Tat Kin 何达坚	PAP
Toa Payoh GRC	Kim Keat	Ong Teng Cheong (until 1993) (Note: Ong resigned on 16 August 1993 to run in the 1993 Singaporean presidential election.) 王鼎昌	PAP
Toa Payoh GRC	Kuo Chuan	S. Dhanabalan எஸ். தநபாலன்	PAP
Toa Payoh GRC	Toa Payoh	Davinder Singh ਦਵਿੰਦਰ ਸਿੰਘ	PAP
Ulu Pandan SMC		Lim Boon Heng 林文兴	PAP
Yuhua SMC		Yu-Foo Yee Shoon 于符喜泉	PAP
Nominated Members of Parliament		Chia Shi Teck (1992–1994) 谢世德	NMP
Nominated Members of Parliament		Robert Chua (1992–1994) 蔡哲洲	NMP
Nominated Members of Parliament		Kanwaljit Soin (1992–1994) ਕੰਵਲਜੀਤ ਸੋਇਨ	NMP
Nominated Members of Parliament		Toh Keng Kiat (1992–1994) 苏庆杰	NMP
Nominated Members of Parliament		Tong Kok Yeo (1992–1994) 唐国耀	NMP
Nominated Members of Parliament		Walter Woon (from 1992) 温长明	NMP
Nominated Members of Parliament		John de Payva (from 1994)	NMP
Nominated Members of Parliament		Imram Mohamed (from 1994) عمران محمد	NMP
Nominated Members of Parliament		Stephen Lee (from 1994) 李庆言	NMP
Nominated Members of Parliament		Lee Tsao Yuan (from 1994) 李曹圆	NMP
