= Ministry of Finance (Singapore) =

Ministry of the Government of Singapore

Agency overview
- Formed: 1959; 67 years ago
- Jurisdiction: Government of Singapore
- Headquarters: 100 High Street, #06-03 The Treasury, Singapore 179434
- Motto: Growth with Opportunity for All
- Employees: 3,858 (2018)
- Annual budget: ▲ S$1.02 billion (2019)
- Ministers responsible: Lawrence Wong, Prime Minister and Minister; Indranee Rajah, Second Minister; Jeffrey Siow, Second Minister II; Shawn Huang, Senior Parliamentary Secretary
- Agency executives: Lai Chung Han, Permanent Secretary; Ngiam Siew Ying, Second Permanent Secretary; Kevin Shum, Deputy Secretary (Planning); Adrian Chua, Deputy Secretary (Development)
- Child agencies: Accounting and Corporate Regulatory Authority; Inland Revenue Authority of Singapore; Tote Board; Accountant-General's Department; Singapore Customs; VITAL
- Website: Official website www.singaporebudget.gov.sg
- Agency ID: T08GA0013E

The Ministry of Finance (MOF; Malay: Kementerian Kewangan; Chinese: 财政部; Tamil: நிதி அமைச்சு) is a ministry of the Government of Singapore responsible for managing the fiscal policies and the structure of the economy of Singapore.

== Responsibilities ==
The authority's main regulatory framework includes the Accountants Act, Accounting Standards Act, Business Registration Act, Companies Act, Limited Partnerships Act and Limited Liability Partnerships Act. These laws set out the rules for accounting, business registration and company governance. The Ministry of Finance also works to ensure that Singapore's business laws and standards follow international best practices in company law, accounting and corporate governance.

=== Singapore Budget ===
Every year, the MOF prepares the Singapore Budget and the Minister for Finance presents the Budget to the Parliament before the new financial year begins. The Budget includes the revised Government revenue and expenditure projections for the current financial year as well as the planned government revenue and expenditures for the following financial year.

Following the delivery of the Budget Statement in Parliament, Members of Parliament will debate on the statement and the proposed Budget for the following financial year. After the debate, the Parliament passes the Supply Bill and the President's assent will then be sought to allow the Bill to come into effect. Once the President gives its assent to the Supply Bill, it is then enacted as law known as the Supply Act. The Supply Act controls the Government's spending in the following financial year.

== Organisational structure ==
The MOF oversees 3 statutory boards, which are the Accounting and Corporate Regulatory Authority (ACRA), Inland Revenue Authority of Singapore (IRAS) and Tote Board. It also had 3 departments, the Accountant-General's Department (AGD), Singapore Customs and VITAL.

=== Statutory Boards ===
- Accounting and Corporate Regulatory Authority
- Inland Revenue Authority of Singapore
- Tote Board

== Ministers ==
The Ministry of Finance is led by the Minister for Finance, a position appointed within the Cabinet of Singapore. It replaced the former role of Financial Secretary of Singapore. The ministry was created after the 1959 general election during Lee Kuan Yew's First Cabinet, with Goh Keng Swee serving as its inaugural minister. Since its formation, all individuals who have held the position of Minister for Finance have been members of the People's Action Party (PAP). Two prime ministers have also concurrently held the finance ministry: Lee Hsien Loong (2004 to 2007) and Lawrence Wong (2024 to present).

Minister	Took office	Left office	Party	Cabinet
Goh Keng Swee; MP for Kreta Ayer (1918–2010)	5 June 1959	8 August 1965	PAP	Lee K. I
Goh Keng Swee; MP for Kreta Ayer (1918–2010)	5 June 1959	8 August 1965	PAP	Lee K. II
Lim Kim San; MP for Cairnhill (1916–2006)	9 August 1965	16 August 1967	PAP	Lee K. II
Goh Keng Swee; MP for Kreta Ayer (1918–2010)	17 August 1967	10 August 1970	PAP	Lee K. II
Goh Keng Swee; MP for Kreta Ayer (1918–2010)	17 August 1967	10 August 1970	PAP	Lee K. III
Hon Sui Sen; MP for Havelock (1916–1983)	11 August 1970	14 October 1983	PAP	Lee K. III
Hon Sui Sen; MP for Havelock (1916–1983)	11 August 1970	14 October 1983	PAP	Lee K. IV
Hon Sui Sen; MP for Havelock (1916–1983)	11 August 1970	14 October 1983	PAP	Lee K. V
Hon Sui Sen; MP for Havelock (1916–1983)	11 August 1970	14 October 1983	PAP	Lee K. VI
Tony Tan; MP for Sembawang (born 1940)	24 October 1983	6 May 1985	PAP	Lee K. VI
Tony Tan; MP for Sembawang (born 1940)	24 October 1983	6 May 1985	PAP	Lee K. VII
Richard Hu; MP for Kreta Ayer SMC (until 1996) and Kreta Ayer–Tanglin GRC (from 1997) (1926–2023)	7 May 1985	9 November 2001	PAP	Lee K. VII
Richard Hu; MP for Kreta Ayer SMC (until 1996) and Kreta Ayer–Tanglin GRC (from 1997) (1926–2023)	7 May 1985	9 November 2001	PAP	Lee K. VIII
Richard Hu; MP for Kreta Ayer SMC (until 1996) and Kreta Ayer–Tanglin GRC (from 1997) (1926–2023)	7 May 1985	9 November 2001	PAP	Goh I
Richard Hu; MP for Kreta Ayer SMC (until 1996) and Kreta Ayer–Tanglin GRC (from 1997) (1926–2023)	7 May 1985	9 November 2001	PAP	Goh II
Richard Hu; MP for Kreta Ayer SMC (until 1996) and Kreta Ayer–Tanglin GRC (from 1997) (1926–2023)	7 May 1985	9 November 2001	PAP	Goh III
Lee Hsien Loong; MP for Ang Mo Kio GRC (born 1952)	10 November 2001	30 November 2007	PAP	Goh III
Lee Hsien Loong; MP for Ang Mo Kio GRC (born 1952)	10 November 2001	30 November 2007	PAP	Goh IV
Lee Hsien Loong; MP for Ang Mo Kio GRC (born 1952)	10 November 2001	30 November 2007	PAP	Lee H. I
Lee Hsien Loong; MP for Ang Mo Kio GRC (born 1952)	10 November 2001	30 November 2007	PAP	Lee H. II
Tharman Shanmugaratnam; MP for Jurong GRC (born 1957)	1 December 2007	30 September 2015	PAP	Lee H. II
Tharman Shanmugaratnam; MP for Jurong GRC (born 1957)	1 December 2007	30 September 2015	PAP	Lee H. III
Heng Swee Keat; MP for Tampines GRC (until 2020) and East Coast GRC (from 2020) (born 1961)	1 October 2015	14 May 2021	PAP	Lee H. IV
Heng Swee Keat; MP for Tampines GRC (until 2020) and East Coast GRC (from 2020) (born 1961)	1 October 2015	14 May 2021	PAP	Lee H. V
Lawrence Wong; MP for Marsiling–Yew Tee GRC (born 1972)	15 May 2021	Incumbent	PAP	Lee H. V
Lawrence Wong; MP for Marsiling–Yew Tee GRC (born 1972)	15 May 2021	Incumbent	PAP	Wong I
Lawrence Wong; MP for Marsiling–Yew Tee GRC (born 1972)	15 May 2021	Incumbent	PAP	Wong II
