= 1997 general election =

1997 general election may refer to:

- 1997 Canadian federal election
- 1997 Irish general election
- 1997 Singaporean general election
- 1997 United Kingdom general election
