= Supply Act (Singapore) =

Statute of the Parliament of Singapore

Parliament of Singapore
- Long title: An Act to provide for the issue from the Consolidated Fund and the Development Fund of the sums necessary to meet the estimated expenditure for the financial year.
- Enacted by: Parliament of Singapore

The Supply Act is a statute passed by the Parliament of Singapore that provides for the amount of money, issued from the Consolidated and Development Funds, that the Government may spend in the coming financial year. It also specifies the purposes for which the money may be spent. As an example, the 2014 law is designed specifically to make sure that the total moneys authorised between 1 April 2014 to 31 March 2015 to be issued from the Consolidated Fund for the financial period is less than S$64,374,642,700, while the total moneys authorised to be issued from the Development Fund for the financial period is less than S$24,780,828,700.

== Overview ==
The Supply Act is usually debated as the Annual Budget of the Government of Singapore. Before the end of each financial year, the Ministry of Finance prepares the Singapore Budget and the Minister for Finance presents the Budget to the Parliament before the new financial year begins. The Budget reflects the approved expenditure and the usage of government funds of the past financial year as well as the planned government revenue and expenditures for the following financial year.

Following the delivery of the Budget Statement in Parliament, Members of Parliament will sit as the Committee of Supply with the Speaker presiding as Chairman of the Committee and will debate on the statement and the proposed Budget for the following financial year. Upon approval, the Parliament will give its approval by passing the Supply Bill. Assent by the President of Singapore will then be sought to allow the Bill to come into effect. Once the President gives its assent to the Supply Bill, it is then enacted as law known as the Supply Act. The Supply Act controls the Government’s spending in the subsequent financial year.

The year 2016 marked the first time that the Supply Bill was introduced by Heng Swee Keat as Minister for Finance.

== Recent Supply Acts ==
- Supply Act 2012, Act 6 of 2012
- Supply Act 2013, Act 8 of 2013
- Supply Act 2014, Act 14 of 2014
- Supply Act 2015, Act 9 of 2015
- Supply Act 2018, Act 13 of 2018

== See also ==
- Ministry of Finance (Singapore)
