= Thomas Thomas (politician) =

Singaporean trade unionist and politician

Thomas Thomas is a former Nominated Member of Parliament in Singapore. He is currently the chief executive officer of the Association for Southeast Asian Nations (ASEAN) Corporate Social Responsibility (CSR) Network. Prior to that, he was the executive director of the Singapore Compact for Corporate Social Responsibility (CSR) (now renamed as Global Compact Network Singapore), which serves as the national CSR society in Singapore, which is the country network and focal point of the United Nations Global Compact.

== Education ==
Thomas was educated in Victoria School and University of Nottingham and holds a Master of Arts degree in Industrial Relations from University of Warwick. He is also a Fellow of the Chartered Institute of Personnel and Development, UK.

== Career ==
Thomas served in the trade union movement as the General Secretary of the Singapore-Shell Employees’ Union, and was in the Central Committee of the National Trades Union Congress (NTUC) from 1987 to 2007. He was a Nominated Member of Parliament from 1999 to 2000. He is a Singapore Labour Foundation-Ong Teng Cheong Labour Leadership Institute Fellow. For his services to the labour movement, Thomas was awarded the Public Service Medal in 2002 and Comrade of Labour – Star in 2008.

As a Nominated MP, Thomas had represented Singapore at the Association of Asian Parliaments for Peace [AAPP] Conference in Phnom Penh, Cambodia in 2001. In Parliament, he had asked the Minister for Finance to give an evaluation of the performance of overseas investments made by the government and government-linked organisations, particularly its performance since the 1997 Asian currency crisis.

== Sources ==
- "Corporate social responsibility catches on"
- "Singapore firms practise good ethics: Poll"
- Thomas Thomas at Association for Sustainable & Responsible Investment in Asia, 2010 Carbon Disclosure Forum
- NTUC U Portal – OTCi Fellowship. National Trades Union Congress, Ong Teng Cheong Labour Leadership Institute (OTCi).
