= Ahmad Magad =

Singaporean politician

- أحمد ماعاد

Member of Parliament for Pasir Ris–Punggol GRC
- In office 25 October 2001 – 19 April 2011
- Preceded by: Constituency established
- Succeeded by: PAP held

Member of Parliament for Pasir Ris GRC
- In office 2 January 1997 – 18 October 2001
- Preceded by: Constituency established
- Succeeded by: Constituency abolished

Personal details
- Born: Ahmad bin Mohamed Magad; 22 December 1952 (age 73) Colony of Singapore
- Party: People's Action Party
- Education: Fachhochschule Aalen
- Profession: Politician; engineer

Ahmad bin Mohamed Magad (Note: Jawi: أحمد بن محمد ماعا) (born 22 December 1952) is a Singaporean former politician. A member of the governing People's Action Party (PAP), he was the Member of Parliament (MP) representing the Pasir Ris Central division of Pasir Ris Group Representation Constituency (GRC) between 1997 and 2001 and the Pasir Ris East division of Pasir Ris–Punggol GRC between 2001 and 2011.

== Early life and education ==
Magad was one of six children of Arab Singaporean Mohamed Omar Magad. Magad completed his primary education at Haig Boys' School and his secondary education at Presbyterian High School. He won a Public Service Commission scholarship and pursued an engineering degree at Fachhochschule Aalen in Germany, graduating in 1974. He completed an MBA from Brunel University in 1990.

== Career ==
Following his graduation from university, Magad worked as a Training Officer for the Economic Development Board from 1974 to 1979. He subsequently became an engineering manager with FJW Industries. In 1989, Magad became the Managing Director of II-VI Singapore Pte Ltd, a subsidiary of a United States company that produces optoelectronic components. He continues to hold this position till today.

Magad was one of the co-founders of the organisation Association of Muslim Professionals, which was intended to be an independent non-partisan alternative to MENDAKI. He was also appointed as a Justice of the Peace.

=== Political career ===
Magad contested election as a PAP candidate in the 1997 general election in Pasir Ris GRC. His PAP team comprised Charles Chong, Ong Kian Min, and Teo Chee Hean. The team won 70.86% of the votes against the Workers' Party.

In the 2001 general election, the boundaries were redrawn and Magad joined the PAP team for Pasir Ris-Punggol GRC. The constituency was uncontested and the PAP team was elected to parliament.

In the 2006 general election, Magad remained in the PAP team for Pasir Ris-Punggol GRC. The PAP team defeated the SDA team by winning 68.70% of the votes.

Magad stepped down from politics before the 2011 general election

== Notes ==
Parliament of Singapore
| New constituency | Member of Parliament for Pasir Ris GRC (Pasir Ris Loyang); 1997 – 2001 | Constituency abolished |
| New constituency | Member of Parliament for Pasir Ris–Punggol GRC (Pasir Ris East); 2001 – 2011 | Succeeded by Zainal Sapari |
