= Imram Mohamed =

Singaporean politician

Imram bin Mohamed (born 22 June 1944) was formerly the Senior Manager of Flight Operations and Chief Flight Engineer in Singapore Airlines, having worked there for 42 years. He was also the former chairman of the Association of Muslim Professionals, of which he was a founding member.

He was a Nominated Member of Parliament in the 8th Parliament of Singapore after which, he was given the public post of Justice of the Peace under the Prime Minister's Office in Singapore. He served in Singapore's 2011 Parliamentary Elections Malay Community Committee, was the chair of the 2015 Parliamentary Elections Malay Community Committee, and is once again the chair of the 2017 Presidential Elections Malay Community Sub-committee – a five-member panel tasked with assessing whether prospective presidential candidates belong to the Malay community in Singapore.

== Family life ==
Imram Mohamed is the second of seven siblings. He is married to Jamaliah Saharuddin and has four children.
