= Kampong Glam Group Representation Constituency =

Historical constituency in Singapore

Kampong Glam
- Group Representative Constituency constituency for the Parliament of Singapore
- Region: Singapore
- Electorate: 73,317

Current constituency
- Created: 1991
- Seats: 4
- Member: Constituency abolished
- Replaced by: Jalan Besar GRC

Kampong Glam Group Representation Constituency (GRC) was a defunct four-member Group Representation Constituency in the Central Business District of Singapore, only in 1991 election. Kampong Glam GRC was co-led by Loh Meng See and Yeo Ning Hong.

== History ==
The GRC was formed during the 1991 Singaporean general election by merging four existing four Single Member Constituencies (SMC), Kampong Glam SMC, Cairnhill SMC, Moulmein SMC and Kim Seng SMC.

During the 1991 Singaporean general election, a People's Action Party team led by Loh Meng See and Yeo Ning Hong contested the GRC and was elected uncontested.

The GRC existed for one electoral term as it was dissolved in 1997, splitting back into Kampong Glam SMC and new Kreta Ayer–Tanglin Group Representation Constituency

== Members of Parliament ==
Year	Division	Members of Parliament	Party
Formation
1991	Kampong Glam; Cairnhill; Moulmein; Kim Seng	Loh Meng See; Wong Kwei Cheung; Sinakruppan Ramasamy; Yeo Ning Hong	PAP
Constituency abolished (1997)

== Electoral results ==
Note: The Elections Department does not include rejected votes when calculating the vote shares of candidates. Hence, all candidates' vote shares will total to 100% at any given election (may not appear so in multi-way contests due to rounding).

General Election 1991
Party	Candidate	Votes	%
PAP	Loh Meng See; Yeo Ning Hong; Wong Kwei Cheong; Sinnakaruppan C. Ramasamy	Unopposed	
Registered electors		73,317	
PAP win (new seat)			

== See also ==
- Kampong Glam Single Member Constituency
