= Pasir Ris Group Representation Constituency =

Former electoral constituency in Singapore

Coordinates: 1.38°N 103.95°E

Pasir Ris
- Former Group representation constituency
- Region: East Region, Singapore
- Electorate: 85,908

Former constituency
- Created: 1997
- Abolished: 2001
- Seats: 4
- Party: People's Action Party
- Member: 4
- Local council: Pasir Ris
- Created from: Eunos Group Representation Constituency
- Replaced by: Pasir Ris–Punggol Group Representation Constituency

Pasir Ris Group Representation Constituency was a four-member group representation constituency (GRC) in eastern Singapore.

== History ==
A PAP team led by Teo Chee Hean won the contest for Pasir Ris GRC during the 1997 general election. The GRC was split into Pasir Ris Loyang, Pasir Ris Elias, Pasir Ris Central, Pasir Ris South divisions by the PAP.

In 2001 General Election, this GRC absorbed 3 wards in Punggol areas, while 3 of the 4 existing member wards in Pasir Ris were consolidated into 2 wards. With such enlargement, this GRC was renamed into Pasir Ris–Punggol GRC and expanded to a 5 members GRC. Since then, it again expanded to 6 members GRC during 2006 General Election until the 2020 General Election.

== Members of Parliament ==
Year	Division	Members of Parliament	Party
Formation
1997	Pasir Ris Loyang; Pasir Ris Elias; Pasir Ris Central; Pasir Ris South	Teo Chee Hean; Charles Chong; Ahmad Magad; Ong Kian Min	PAP
Constituency abolished (2001)

== Electoral results ==
Note: The Elections Department does not include rejected votes when calculating the vote shares of candidates. Hence, all candidates' vote shares will total to 100% at any given election (may not appear so in multi-way contests due to rounding).

=== Elections in 1990s ===
General Election 1997
Party	Candidate	Votes	%
PAP	Teo Chee Hean Charles Chong Ahmad Magad Ong Kian Min	56,907	70.86
WP	Abdul Rahim bin Abdul Rahman Balakrishnan Ananthan Sim Say Chuan Lim Chiu Liang	23,404	29.14
Majority		33,503	41.72
Total valid votes		80,311	97.10
Rejected ballots		2,397	2.90
Turnout		82,708	96.3
Registered electors		85,908	
PAP win (new seat)			

== See also ==
- Pasir Ris–Punggol GRC
