= Bukit Timah Group Representation Constituency =

Former electoral division in Singapore

Bukit Timah Group Representation Constituency (Chinese: 武吉知马集选区; pinyin: Wǔjí Zhīmǎ jíxuǎnqū) is a defunct five-member Group Representation Constituency located in the western area of Singapore. It consists of largely Bukit Timah areas, and including parts of Jurong, Clementi and Bukit Batok areas as well. The GRC has only appeared once in 1997 which the ruling party, People's Action Party received a walkover on the nomination day, which is similar to Kreta Ayer–Tanglin GRC's fate.

It was headed by Minister in Prime Minister's Office Lim Boon Heng during the last tenure from 1997 to 2001.

== History ==
The GRC was established in 1996, ahead of the 1997 general election, by merging Bukit Batok, Bukit Timah, Jurong, Ulu Pandan and Yuhua Single Member Constituencies, and parts of Brickworks GRC. In 2001, it was split into Holland–Bukit Panjang, Jurong and West Coast GRCs.

== .Members of Parliament ==
| Year | Division | Members of Parliament | Party |
|---|---|---|---|
Formation
| 1997 | Yuhua; Bukit Batok; Ulu Pandan; Bukit Timah; Jurong | Yu-Foo Yee Shoon; Ong Chit Chung; Lim Boon Heng; Wang Kai Yuen; R. Ravindran | PAP |
Constituency abolished (2001)

== Electoral results ==
Note: The Elections Department does not include rejected votes when calculating the vote shares of candidates. Hence, all candidates' vote shares will total to 100% at any given election (may not appear so in multi-way contests due to rounding).

=== Elections in 1990s ===
General Election 1997
| Party | Candidate | Votes | % |
|---|---|---|---|
| PAP | Wang Kai Yuen; Lim Boon Heng; Yu-Foo Yee Shoon; Ong Chit Chung; R. Ravindran | Unopposed | |
| Registered electors | | 118,248 | |
| PAP win (new seat) | | | |

== See also ==
- Bukit Timah SMC
