= Deputy Prime Minister of Singapore =

Deputy head of Singaporean government

Deputy Prime Minister of the Republic of Singapore
- Coat of arms of Singapore

- Flag of Singapore

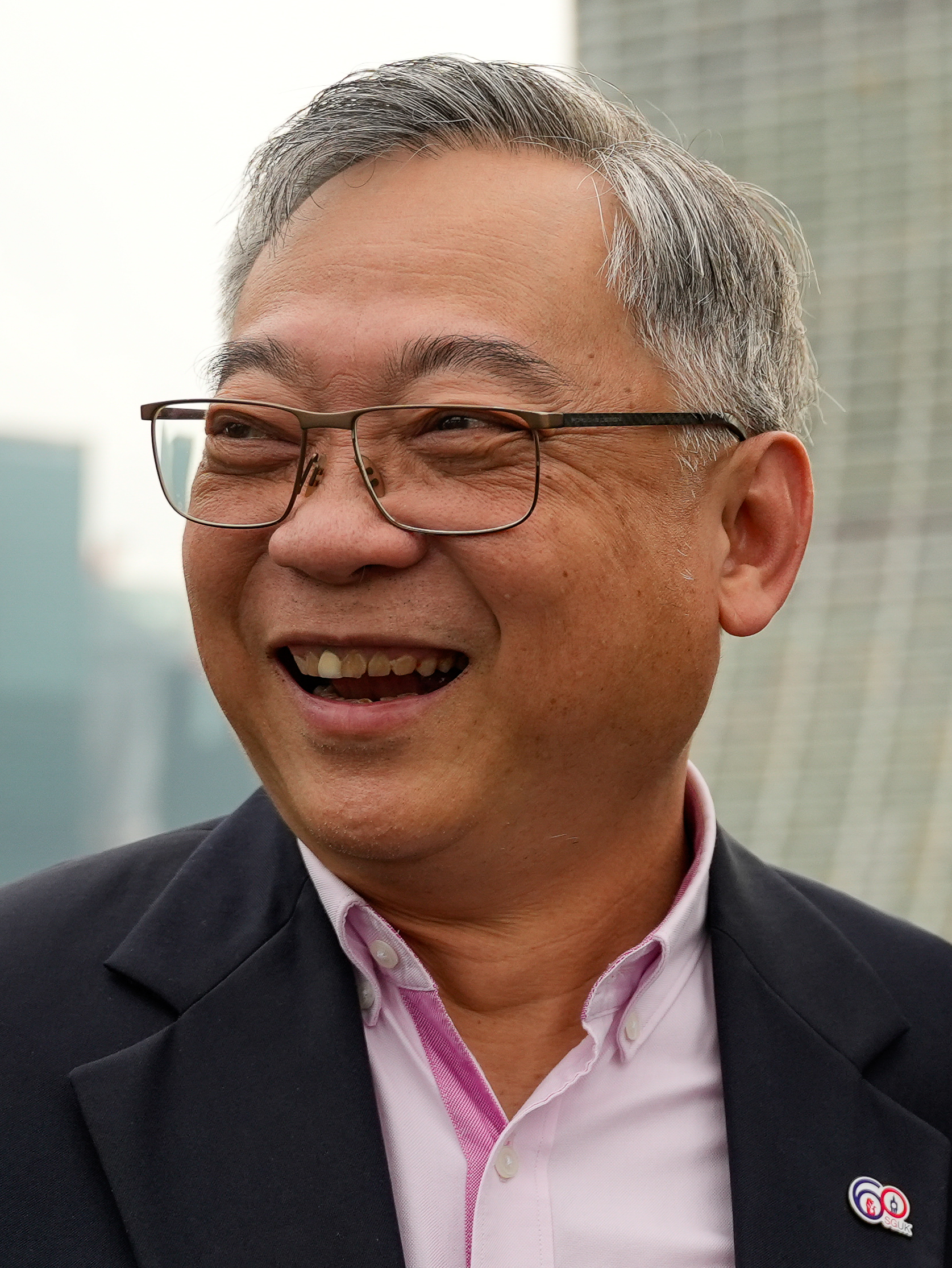
- Incumbent; Gan Kim Yong since 15 May 2024
- Style: Deputy Prime Minister (informal); The Honourable (formal); His Excellency (diplomatic)
- Abbreviation: DPM
- Appointer: Prime Minister
- Term length: At the President's pleasure
- Inaugural holder: Toh Chin Chye
- Formation: 3 June 1959; 67 years ago
- Salary: S$2,040,000 annually (including S$259,000 MP salary) (Note: The salary is currently set at $1,870,000. The new salary amount displayed will take effect beginning 15 October 2026.)
- Website: www.pmo.gov.sg

The deputy prime minister of Singapore (Note: Malay: Timbalan Perdana Menteri Singapura, Chinese: 新加坡副总理; pinyin: Xīnjiāpō Fù Zǒnglǐ, Tamil: சிங்கப்பூர் துணைப் பிரதமர், romanized: Ciṅkappūr Tuṇaip Piratamar) is the deputy head of government of the Republic of Singapore, and a key political ally of the prime minister. The incumbent deputy prime minister is Gan Kim Yong, an MP for Punggol Group Representation Constituency from the governing People's Action Party, who took office on 15 May 2024.

== History ==
The office of deputy prime minister is the second highest position in the Cabinet of Singapore, typically held by senior ministers. At times, two individuals could serve simultaneously as deputy prime ministers. The officeholder is generally assigned specific duties by the prime minister, including deputising in the Parliament of Singapore. Additionally, the deputy prime minister often acts as prime minister during periods when the latter is abroad, on leave or incapacitated.

Established in 1959 with Singapore's attainment of self-governance from the British Empire, the first deputy prime minister was appointed by Yang di-Pertuan Negara William Goode. The position retained its title following Singapore's merger with the Federation of Malaya, Sarawak and North Borneo to form Malaysia, during which Singapore functioned as an autonomous federated state between 1963 and 1965. Toh Chin Chye was the inaugural officeholder, serving from 1959 to 1968. It was vacant from 1968 to 1973, when prime minister Lee Kuan Yew did not pick a deputy for his Third Cabinet after winning the 1968 Singaporean general election.

Two former deputy prime ministers of Singapore have subsequently been elected as President of Singapore. These include Ong Teng Cheong and Tharman Shanmugaratnam, both of whom transitioned from their deputy roles to the nation's head of state. Lawrence Wong assumed the office of deputy prime minister on 13 June 2022 but left the position on 15 May 2024 to become prime minister, making his tenure the shortest in the history of the office. His successor, Gan Kim Yong, took office on 15 May 2024 and continues to serve concurrently as Minister for Trade and Industry.

== List of deputy prime ministers ==
Since its formation, all individuals who have held the position of Deputy Prime Minister have been members of the People's Action Party (PAP).

Political parties

People's Action Party (PAP)

| No. | Portrait | Name Constituency (Birth–Death) | Term of office | | Political party | Prime Minister | Cabinet |
| No. | Portrait | Name Constituency (Birth–Death) | Took office | Left office | Political party | Prime Minister | Cabinet |
|---|---|---|---|---|---|---|---|
| 1 | | Toh Chin Chye; MP for Rochore (1921–2012) | 5 June 1959 | 18 October 1963 | PAP | Lee Kuan Yew | Lee K. I |
| 1 | | Toh Chin Chye; MP for Rochore (1921–2012) | 19 October 1963 | 15 April 1968 | PAP | Lee Kuan Yew | Lee K. II |
| Vacant (16 April 1968 – 15 September 1972) | | | | | | Lee Kuan Yew | Lee K. III |
| Vacant (16 September 1972 – 28 February 1973) | | | | | | Lee Kuan Yew | Lee K. IV |
| 2 | | Goh Keng Swee; MP for Kreta Ayer (1918–2010) | 1 March 1973 | 30 December 1976 | PAP | Lee Kuan Yew | Lee K. IV |
| (2) | | Goh Keng Swee; MP for Kreta Ayer (1918–2010) | 31 December 1976 | 5 January 1981 | PAP | Lee Kuan Yew | Lee K. V |
| 3 | | S. Rajaratnam; MP for Kampong Glam (1915–2006) | 1 June 1980 | 5 January 1981 | PAP | Lee Kuan Yew | Lee K. V |
| (2) | | Goh Keng Swee; MP for Kreta Ayer (1918–2010) | 6 January 1981 | 1 January 1985 | PAP | Lee Kuan Yew | Lee K. VI |
| (3) | | S. Rajaratnam; MP for Kampong Glam (1915–2006) | 6 January 1981 | 1 January 1985 | PAP | Lee Kuan Yew | Lee K. VI |
| 4 | | Goh Chok Tong; MP for Marine Parade SMC (born 1941) | 2 January 1985 | 12 September 1988 | PAP | Lee Kuan Yew | Lee K. VII |
| 5 | | Ong Teng Cheong; MP for Kim Keat SMC (1936–2002) | 2 January 1985 | 12 September 1988 | PAP | Lee Kuan Yew | Lee K. VII |
| (4) | | Goh Chok Tong; MP for Marine Parade GRC (born 1941) | 13 September 1988 | 27 November 1990 | PAP | Lee Kuan Yew | Lee K. VIII |
| (5) | | Ong Teng Cheong; MP for Kim Keat SMC (1936–2002) | 13 September 1988 | 27 November 1990 | PAP | Lee Kuan Yew | Lee K. VIII |
| 6 | | Lee Hsien Loong; MP for Teck Ghee SMC (born 1952) | 28 November 1990 | 6 September 1991 | PAP | Goh Chok Tong | Goh I |
| (5) | | Ong Teng Cheong; MP for Kim Keat SMC (1936–2002) | 28 November 1990 | 6 September 1991 | PAP | Goh Chok Tong | Goh I |
| (6) | | Lee Hsien Loong; MP for Ang Mo Kio GRC (born 1952) | 7 September 1991 | 24 January 1997 | PAP | Goh Chok Tong | Goh II |
| (5) | | Ong Teng Cheong; MP for Toa Payoh GRC (1936–2002) | 7 September 1991 | 16 August 1993 | PAP | Goh Chok Tong | Goh II |
| 7 | | Tony Tan; MP for Sembawang GRC (born 1940) | 1 August 1995 | 24 January 1997 | PAP | Goh Chok Tong | Goh II |
| (6) | | Lee Hsien Loong; MP for Ang Mo Kio GRC (born 1952) | 25 January 1997 | 22 November 2001 | PAP | Goh Chok Tong | Goh III |
| (7) | | Tony Tan; MP for Sembawang GRC (born 1940) | 25 January 1997 | 22 November 2001 | PAP | Goh Chok Tong | Goh III |
| (6) | | Lee Hsien Loong; MP for Ang Mo Kio GRC (born 1952) | 23 November 2001 | 11 August 2004 | PAP | Goh Chok Tong | Goh IV |
| (7) | | Tony Tan; MP for Sembawang GRC (born 1940) | 23 November 2001 | 11 August 2004 | PAP | Goh Chok Tong | Goh IV |
| (7) | | Tony Tan; MP for Sembawang GRC (born 1940) | 12 August 2004 | 1 September 2005 | PAP | Lee Hsien Loong | Lee H. I |
| 8 | | S. Jayakumar; MP for East Coast GRC (born 1939) | 12 August 2004 | 29 May 2006 | PAP | Lee Hsien Loong | Lee H. I |
| (8) | | S. Jayakumar; MP for East Coast GRC (born 1939) | 30 May 2006 | 1 April 2009 | PAP | Lee Hsien Loong | Lee H. II |
| 9 | | Wong Kan Seng; MP for Bishan–Toa Payoh GRC (born 1946) | 30 May 2006 | 20 May 2011 | PAP | Lee Hsien Loong | Lee H. II |
| 10 | | Teo Chee Hean; MP for Pasir Ris–Punggol GRC (born 1954) | 1 April 2009 | 20 May 2011 | PAP | Lee Hsien Loong | Lee H. II |
| (10) | | Teo Chee Hean; MP for Pasir Ris–Punggol GRC (born 1954) | 21 May 2011 | 30 September 2015 | PAP | Lee Hsien Loong | Lee H. III |
| 11 | | Tharman Shanmugaratnam; MP for Jurong GRC (born 1957) | 21 May 2011 | 30 September 2015 | PAP | Lee Hsien Loong | Lee H. III |
| (10) | | Teo Chee Hean; MP for Pasir Ris–Punggol GRC (born 1954) | 1 October 2015 | 30 April 2019 | PAP | Lee Hsien Loong | Lee H. IV |
| (11) | | Tharman Shanmugaratnam; MP for Jurong GRC (born 1957) | 1 October 2015 | 30 April 2019 | PAP | Lee Hsien Loong | Lee H. IV |
| 12 | | Heng Swee Keat; MP for Tampines GRC (born 1961) | 1 May 2019 | 26 July 2020 | PAP | Lee Hsien Loong | Lee H. IV |
| (12) | | Heng Swee Keat; MP for East Coast GRC (born 1961) | 27 July 2020 | 14 May 2024 | PAP | Lee Hsien Loong | Lee H. V |
| 13 | | Lawrence Wong; MP for Marsiling–Yew Tee GRC (born 1972) | 13 June 2022 | 14 May 2024 | PAP | Lee Hsien Loong | Lee H. V |
| 14 | | Gan Kim Yong; MP for Chua Chu Kang GRC (born 1959) | 15 May 2024 | 22 May 2024 | PAP | Lawrence Wong | Wong I |
| (12) | | Heng Swee Keat; MP for East Coast GRC (born 1961) | 15 May 2024 | 22 May 2025 | PAP | Lawrence Wong | Wong I |
| (14) | | Gan Kim Yong; MP for Punggol GRC (born 1959) | 23 May 2025 | Incumbent | PAP | Lawrence Wong | Wong II |

== See also ==
- Prime Minister of Singapore
- Senior Minister of Singapore
- Prime Minister's Office (PMO)
- Cabinet of Singapore
