= Chan Soo Sen =

Singaporean politician

- 曾士生

Member of Parliament for Joo Chiat SMC
- In office 3 November 2001 – 19 April 2011
- Succeeded by: Charles Chong
- Majority: 5,646 (30.02%)

Member of Parliament for East Coast GRC (Joo Chiat ward)
- In office 23 December 1996 – 18 October 2001
- Preceded by: Teo Chee Hean (Marine Parade GRC)
- Succeeded by: Himself (Joo Chiat SMC)

Personal details
- Born: 1 October 1956 (age 69) Colony of Singapore
- Party: People's Action Party (1997-2011)
- Education: Nan Chiau High School

Chan Soo Sen (Note: Chinese: 曾士生; Pe̍h-ōe-jī: Chan Sū-seng; pinyin: Zēng Shìshēng) (born 1 October 1956) is a Singaporean former politician from the People's Action Party. He was the Member of Parliament representing the Joo Chiat ward in the East Coast Group Representation Constituency from 1997 to 2001 and the Joo Chiat Single Member Constituency (SMC) from 2001 to 2011.

== Education ==
Chan studied at Catholic High School and was a President's Scholar.

== Career ==
=== Business career ===
Chan also was chief executive officer of the China-Singapore Suzhou Industrial Park Development Co Ltd from 1994 to 1996.

=== Political career ===
Chan represented East Coast GRC between 1996 and 2001.

In the 2001 general elections, he defeated Ooi Boon Ewe, an independent candidate, with 83.55% of the votes in the same SMC.

In the 2006 general elections, Chan, representing PAP, defeated Tan Bing Seng of the Workers' Party of Singapore with 65.01% of the votes in the SMC.

In March 2011, Chan announced his retirement from politics.
