= Kampong Glam Single Member Constituency =

Historical constituency of Singapore

Kampong Glam Single Member Constituency was a single member constituency (SMC) in Kampong Glam, Singapore. It existed as Kampong Glam Constituency from 1959 to 1988 then it was renamed as Kampong Glam Single Member Constituency during political reform in 1988. Once a small constituency with no more than ca. 9,000 registered voters, Kampong Glam constituency voters rose immediately in 1976 with at least 16,000 voters turned out to polling places. The numbers never went down ever since.

The SMC lasted another term till 1991 when it was absorbed into Kampong Glam Group Representation Constituency (GRC). The GRC is disbanded in the next election in 1997 and Kampong Glam SMC was recreated. Again, the SMC lasted for another term before being merged into Jalan Besar GRC.

== Member of Parliament ==
Year	Member of Parliament	Party
Legislative Assembly of Singapore
1959	S Rajaratnam	PAP
1963	S Rajaratnam	PAP
Parliament of Singapore
1968	S Rajaratnam	PAP
1972	S Rajaratnam	PAP
1976	S Rajaratnam	PAP
1980	S Rajaratnam	PAP
1984	S Rajaratnam	PAP
1988	Loh Meng See	PAP
Constituency abolished (1991–1997)
1997	Loh Meng See	PAP

== Electoral results ==
Note: The Elections Department does not include rejected votes when calculating the vote shares of candidates. Hence, all candidates' vote shares will total to 100% at any given election (may not appear so in multi-way contests due to rounding).

=== Elections in 1950s ===
General Election 1959: Kampong Glam
Party	Candidate	Votes	%	±%
PAP	Rajaratnam Sinnathamby	6,324	65.3	N/A
SPA	Mahmood bin Latiff	1,747	18.0	N/A
LSP	Ong Eng Lian	1,377	14.2	N/A
Independent	Wu Shiaw	241	2.5	N/A
Majority		4,577	47.3	
Turnout		9,792	89.6	N/A
PAP win (new seat)				

=== Elections in 1960s ===
General Election 1963: Kampong Glam
Party	Candidate	Votes	%	±%
PAP	Rajaratnam Sinnathamby	4,313	44.8	−20.5
BS	Tan Jing Quee	4,093	42.5	+42.5
UPP	Harbans Singh	1,224	12.7	+12.7
Majority		220	2.3	−45
Turnout		9,738	95.6	+6
PAP hold		Swing	-20.5	

General Election 1968: Kampong Glam
Party	Candidate	Votes	%	±%
PAP	Rajaratnam Sinnathamby	Walkover		
Majority				
Turnout		9,484		
PAP hold		Swing	N/A	

=== Elections in 1970s ===
General Election 1972: Kampong Glam
Party	Candidate	Votes	%	±%
PAP	Rajaratnam Sinnathamby	Walkover		
Majority				
Turnout		7,542		
PAP hold		Swing	N/A	

General Election 1976: Kampong Glam
Party	Candidate	Votes	%	±%
PAP	Rajaratnam Sinnathamby	13,114	80.1	N/A
United People's Front	Ang Bee Lian	3,241	19.8	N/A
Majority		9,873	60.3	N/A
Turnout		16,787	91.0	N/A
PAP hold		Swing	N/A	

=== Elections in 1980s ===
General Election 1980: Kampong Glam
Party	Candidate	Votes	%	±%
PAP	Rajaratnam Sinnathamby	Walkover		
Majority				
Turnout		17,241		
PAP hold		Swing	N/A	

General Election 1984: Kampong Glam
Party	Candidate	Votes	%	±%
PAP	Rajaratnam Sinnathamby	Walkover		
Majority				
Turnout		18,127		
PAP hold		Swing	N/A	

General Election 1988: Kampong Glam
Party	Candidate	Votes	%	±%
PAP	Loh Meng See	12,525	67.3	N/A
WP	Frederick De Wind	5,800	31.2	N/A
Angkatan Islam	Mohamad Sani bin Jan	280	1.5	N/A
Majority		6,725	36.1	N/A
Turnout		18,959	87.1	N/A
PAP hold		Swing	N/A	

=== Elections in 1990s ===
General Election 1997: Kampong Glam
Party	Candidate	Votes	%	±%
PAP	Loh Meng See	13,446	74.5	N/A
DPP	Tan Lead Shake	4,598	25.5	N/A
Majority		13,446	74.5	
Turnout		18,648		N/A
PAP win (new seat)				
