= Lew Syn Pau =

Singaporean politician

Lew Syn Pau (Note: Chinese: 刘信保; pinyin: Líu Xìnbǎo) is a former Member of Parliament for the Kreta Ayer-Tanglin Group Representation Constituency in Singapore as a People's Action Party politician. From 2002 to 2014, he was the President of the Singapore Manufacturing Federation (SMF); then called the Singapore Manufacturers' Association.

== Education ==
A Singapore Government scholar, Lew had his early education in ACS (Anglo-Chinese-School) and later began his career with the Singapore Civil Service. He holds a Masters of Engineering from Cambridge University UK, and a Masters in Business Administration from Stanford University, USA.

== Career ==
According to corporate appointment announcements to the Singapore Exchange, Lew, along with Chow Kok Kee and Wee Cow Jaw, has the most directorships, 14, of any person in Singapore.

In 2005, he was charged under the Companies Act for contravening Section 76(1)(a)(i)(A) of the Companies Act (alleged illegal financial assistance). Lew was accused of abetting Wong Sheung Sze, chairman of Broadway Industrial Group, in unlawfully giving financial assistance to a third party to buy shares in the company.

Defence lawyers argued that the loan was legal because it was made by an overseas subsidiary, Compart Asia Pacific, the Mauritius-incorporated unit of Broadway. Lew was alleged to have taken a director's loan in 2004 of S$4.2 million from that company.

Lew and Wong were acquitted by the Singapore High Court in August 2006.

=== Political career ===
From 1988 to 2001, Lew was a Member of Parliament. He was also Chairman of the Government Parliamentary Committee for National Development.
