= Kreta Ayer Single Member Constituency =

Historic constituency of Singapore

Coordinates: 1.285°N 103.843°E

Kreta Ayer
- Single Member constituency for the Parliament of Singapore
- Region: Singapore

Current constituency
- Created: 1959
- Seats: 1
- Member: Constituency Abolished
- Town Council: Jalan Besar; Tanjong Pagar
- Replaced by: Jalan Besar GRC; Tanjong Pagar GRC

Kreta Ayer Single Member Constituency was a constituency spanning Chinatown and Raffles Place in Singapore. It used to exist from 1959 to 1988 as Kreta Ayer Constituency and was renamed as Kreta Ayer Single Member Constituency (SMC) as part of Singapore's political reforms. The SMC was merged into Kreta Ayer–Tanglin Group Representation Constituency in 1997.

== Member of Parliament ==
Year	Member of Parliament	Party
Legislative Assembly of Singapore
1959	Goh Keng Swee	PAP
1963	Goh Keng Swee	PAP
Parliament of Singapore
1968	Goh Keng Swee	PAP
1972	Goh Keng Swee	PAP
1976	Goh Keng Swee	PAP
1980	Goh Keng Swee	PAP
1984	Richard Hu	PAP
1988	Richard Hu	PAP
1991	Richard Hu	PAP

== Electoral results ==
Note: The Elections Department does not include rejected votes when calculating the vote shares of candidates. Hence, all candidates' vote shares will total to 100% at any given election (may not appear so in multi-way contests due to rounding).

=== Elections in 1950s ===
General Election 1959: Kreta Ayer
Party	Candidate	Votes	%	±%
PAP	Goh Keng Swee	9,313	73.35	
LSP	Pang Man Ming	3,384	26.65	
Majority		5,929	46.7	
Turnout		12,995	91.69	
PAP hold		Swing		
