= Kreta Ayer–Tanglin Group Representation Constituency =

Historical constituency in Singapore

Kreta Ayer - Tanglin
- Former Group Representative constituency constituency for the Parliament of Singapore
- Region: Singapore

Former constituency
- Created: 1997
- Abolished: 2001
- Seats: 4
- Member: Constituency abolished
- Town Council: Jalan Besar; Tanjong Pagar
- Replaced by: Jalan Besar GRC; Tanjong Pagar GRC

Kreta Ayer–Tanglin Group Representation Constituency was a defunct four-member Group Representation Constituency (GRC) in southwestern Singapore.

== History ==
The GRC was formed in 1997 by splitting up Kampong Glam GRC and incorporating Kreta Ayer Single Member Constituency (SMC) and Tanglin SMC. The Cairnhill ward from Kampong Glam GRC was merged with Tanglin SMC to form the Tanglin ward.

During the 1997 Singaporean general election, a People's Action Party team led by Richard Hu and Lew Syn Pau contested the GRC and was uncontested.

The GRC existed for one electoral term as it was dissolved in 2001, splitting into Jalan Besar GRC and Tanjong Pagar GRC.

== Members of Parliament ==
Year	Division	Members of Parliament	Party
Formation
1997	Kim Seng; Kreta Ayer; Moulmein; Tanglin	Lily Neo; Richard Hu; Sinakruppan Ramasamy; Lew Syn Pau	PAP
Constituency abolished (2001)

== Electoral results ==
Note: The Elections Department does not include rejected votes when calculating the vote shares of candidates. Hence, all candidates' vote shares will total to 100% at any given election (may not appear so in multi-way contests due to rounding).

=== Elections in 1990s ===
General Election 1997
Party	Candidate	Votes	%
PAP	Hu Tsu Tau Richard; Lew Syn Pau; Lily Neo; S Ramasamy	Unopposed	
Registered electors		75,126	
PAP win (new seat)			
