= Richard Hu =

Singaporean politician (1926–2023)

- 胡赐道
- Hu in 1997

Minister for Finance
- In office 7 May 1985 – 9 November 2001
- Prime Minister: Lee Kuan Yew; Goh Chok Tong
- Preceded by: Tony Tan
- Succeeded by: Lee Hsien Loong

Chairman of the Monetary Authority of Singapore
- In office January 1985 – December 1997
- Prime Minister: Lee Kuan Yew; Goh Chok Tong
- Preceded by: Goh Keng Swee
- Succeeded by: Lee Hsien Loong

Minister for Health
- In office 7 May 1985 – 31 December 1986
- Prime Minister: Lee Kuan Yew
- Preceded by: Tony Tan
- Succeeded by: Yeo Cheow Tong

Member of the Singapore Parliament for Kreta Ayer–Tanglin GRC
- In office 2 January 1997 – 18 October 2001
- Preceded by: Constituency created
- Succeeded by: Constituency abolished
- Majority: N/A (walkover)

Member of the Singapore Parliament for Kreta Ayer SMC
- In office 22 December 1984 – 16 December 1996
- Preceded by: Goh Keng Swee
- Succeeded by: Constituency abolished
- Majority: 1984: 1988: 1991:

Personal details
- Born: Hu Tsu Tau; 30 October 1926 Singapore
- Died: 8 September 2023 (aged 96) Singapore
- Party: People's Action Party
- Spouse: Irene Tan Dee Leng
- Children: 2
- Parent: Hu Tsai Kuen (father)
- Education: University of California, Berkeley (BS); University of Birmingham (PhD)

Richard Hu Tsu Tau (Note: Chinese: 胡赐道; pinyin: Hú Cìdào) (30 October 1926 – 8 September 2023) was a Singaporean politician who served as Minister for Finance between 1985 and 2001. A member of the governing People's Action Party (PAP), he was the Member of Parliament (MP) for Kreta Ayer SMC between 1984 and 1997, and Kreta Ayer–Tanglin GRC between 1997 and 2001. Hu was Singapore's longest-serving finance minister and gave a record number of 16 Budget speeches. He served as chairman of the Monetary Authority of Singapore between 1985 and 1997.

== Early life and education ==
Hu was born in Singapore to Hu Tsai Kuen, a physician, and Margaret Kwan Fu Shing. Through his father, he was related to the Singaporean American author Kevin Kwan.

He was educated at the Anglo-Chinese School before graduating from the University of California, Berkeley, in 1952 with a Bachelor of Science degree in chemistry. He subsequently went on to complete a PhD in chemical engineering at the University of Birmingham.

== Career ==
Hu joined the Royal Dutch Shell Group of Companies in 1960 and rose to the position of chairman and chief executive in Singapore, where he served from 1977 to 1983. In 1983, Hu was appointed managing director of the Monetary Authority of Singapore (MAS) and Government of Singapore Investment Corporation (GIC), where he served until 1984 concurrently. He was chairman of the Monetary Authority of Singapore from 1985 to 1997.

Hu made his political debut in the 1984 general election as a People's Action Party (PAP) candidate contesting in Kreta Ayer SMC and won. He was later appointed Minister for Health in 1985, where he served until 1987. He was also Minister for Finance from 1985 to 2001. He had also briefly served as Minister for National Development from 1992 to 1993.

As Minister for Finance, Hu was known for his signature on the 'Ship' series of legal tender notes issued after his appointment. He introduced the Goods and Services Tax (GST) in 1993. As part of deregulation and reform of its financial and banking sectors, Hu oversaw the privatisation of the government-linked Post Office Savings Bank (POSB) and the sale of POSB to the Development Bank of Singapore (DBS) in 1998.

Hu retied from politics in the 2001 general elections.

On 13 April 2004, Hu was appointed CapitaLand's chairman of the board, where he served until his retirement in 2012. He was also chairman of GIC Real Estate Pte Ltd and Asia Financial Holdings Pte Ltd, and director of the Government of Singapore Investment Corporation (GIC) and Buildfolio.Com.Inc. Hu served as the chancellor of the Singapore Management University from July 2002 to August 2010. Hu retired from GIC in 2012. In 2013, he was appointed senior advisor of the Fraser and Neave board.

== Personal life ==
Hu was married to Irene Tan Dee Leng, with whom he had two children. He was of Hakka Chinese ancestry.

Hu died on 8 September 2023, at age of 96.

== Notes ==
Political offices
| Preceded by Tony Tan | Minister for Finance; 1985–2001 | Succeeded by Lee Hsien Loong |
| Preceded by Howe Yoon Chong | Minister for Health; 1985–1987 | Succeeded by Yeo Cheow Tong |
| Preceded by S. Dhanabalan | Minister for National Development; 1 September 1992 – 1993 | Succeeded by Lim Hng Kiang |
