= Ong Chit Chung =

Singaporean politician

- 翁执中

Member of the Singapore Parliament for Jurong GRC
- In office 25 October 2001 – 14 July 2008
- Preceded by: Constituency established
- Succeeded by: Constituency abolished
- Majority: N/A (walkover)

Member of the Singapore Parliament for Bukit Timah GRC
- In office 2 January 1997 – 18 October 2001
- Preceded by: Constituency established
- Succeeded by: Constituency abolished
- Majority: N/A (walkover)

Member of the Singapore Parliament for Bukit Batok
- In office 3 September 1988 – 16 December 1996
- Preceded by: Chai Chong Yii
- Succeeded by: Constituency abolished
- Majority: 1988: 2,734 (11.88%); 1991: 858 (3.57%)

Personal details
- Born: Ong Chit Chung; 28 January 1949 Muar, Johore, Federation of Malaya (now Malaysia)
- Died: 14 July 2008 (aged 59) Singapore
- Party: People's Action Party
- Spouse: Elizabeth Ong
- Children: 2
- Education: Victoria School
- Occupation: Military historian

Ong Chit Chung (Note: Chinese: 翁执中; pinyin: Wēng Zhízhōng) (28 January 1949 – 14 July 2008) was a Singaporean politician who served as a Member of Parliament (MP) for Bukit Timah Group Representation Constituency (GRC) from May 1997 to October 2001 and Jurong GRC from March 2002 till his death in July 2008. He was also a military historian at the National University of Singapore.

== Career ==
Entering politics in 1988, Ong served the Bukit Batok Constituency for two terms, before the constituency became part of the Bukit Timah Group Representation Constituency in 1996, and the constituency becoming a part of the Jurong Group Representation Constituency in 2001. In 1991, Ong was appointed Parliamentary Secretary for Ministry of Home Affairs and Labour. During his twenty years in politics, Ong also served as the Chairman for the Government Parliamentary Committees for Education, Defence and Foreign Affairs.

Ong was also as a historian with several publications about World War II.

Ong's seat in Bukit Timah GRC was left vacant after his death, with the remaining MPs of Jurong GRC taking care of his ward.

== Death ==
Ong died at home on 14 July 2008, leaving behind a wife and two sons.

== Legacy ==
On 2 August 2008, Ong's alma mater, Victoria School, named a student leadership award after Ong. Called the Dr. Ong Chit Chung Leadership Award, it is awarded to high-performing students in the school. Ong's old Chief Librarian badge that was used when he was still in Victoria School, was presented by Ong's widow to the principal Low Eng Teong, and was later added to the collection in the school's heritage centre.

The Ong Chit Chung Memorial Scholarship in the Department of History at the National University of Singapore is also named after him.

== See also ==
- List of members of the Singapore Parliament who died in office
