= Aline Wong =

Singaporean sociologist, politician

- 黄简丽中

Minister of State for Ministry of Health
- In office 28 November 1990 – 16 April 1995

Member of the Singapore Parliament for Tampines GRC
- In office 3 September 1988 – 18 October 2001
- Preceded by: Constituency established
- Succeeded by: PAP held
- Majority: 1988: 13,420 (22.00%); 1991: 12,387 (18.96%); 1997: N/A (walkover)

Member of the Singapore Parliament for Changkat SMC
- In office 22 December 1984 – 17 August 1988
- Preceded by: Constituency established
- Succeeded by: Constituency abolished
- Majority: 3,013 (17.12%)

Personal details
- Born: Kan Lai Chung; 1941 (age 84–85) British Hong Kong
- Party: People's Action Party
- Occupation: Sociologist and politician
- Known for: Chancellor, SIM University

Aline Wong-Kan Lai Chung (Note: Chinese: 黄简丽中; Jyutping: Wong^{4} Gaan^{2} Lai^{6} Zung^{1}; pinyin: Huáng-Jiǎn Lìzhōng, also known as Aline Kan Wong) (born 1941) is a Singaporean sociologist and former politician. A member of the governing People's Action Party (PAP), Wong had been the Member of Parliament (MP) representing Changkat Constituency from 1984 to 1988 and as part of a PAP team, representing Tampines Group Representation Constituency (GRC) from 1988 to 2001. She was also a Senior Minister of State for Health with an additional portfolio of Education. Wong also led the PAP's Women Wing until her retirement from politics in 2001.

After retirement from politics, Wong became an academic adviser for UniSIM starting in 2005. In 2015, she became the first woman named as chancellor of UniSIM and the first woman chancellor in Singapore.

== Early life and education ==
Wong was born in Hong Kong in 1941.

Wong studied sociology and worked on issues involving the way Singapore's families were changing and how women were becoming involved in different areas of culture and the economy.

== Career ==
=== Academic career ===
Wong started her academic career as a lecturer at the University of Singapore (NUS) in 1971. Wong and Vivienne Wee started the first gender studies class in Singapore at NUS in 1987. Wong became a fellow at the Kennedy School of Government in 2002. Wong became an academic adviser for UniSIM starting in 2005. In 2015, she became the first woman named as chancellor of UniSIM and the first woman chancellor in Singapore.

=== Political career ===
In 1984, after 14 years of zero female politicians in the parliament of Singapore, Wong, Dixie Tan and Yu-Foo Yee Shoon were elected to Singapore's Parliament. Wong was a member of the PAP and represented Changkat Constituency.

During the 1988 Singaporean general election, following the establishment of GRC and Single Member Constituency (SMC), Changkat Constituency was merged into Tampines GRC. Wong then contested Tampines GRC as a member of a PAP team which won the contest. Wong would continue to be part of the PAP team representing Tampines GRC till 2001.

In 1989, PAP set up a Women's Wing and was managed by Wong until she retired from politics in 2001.

In Parliament, Wong worked to advance issues that affected the lives of women and advocate for women's equality in public life. Wong also become the Minister of State for Health in 1990 and five years later rose to the position of Senior Minister of State, where she focused on education. In 2001, Wong retired from politics.

=== Other career ===
Wong worked on the Housing and Development Board (HDB) as chair between 2003 and 2007. Wong was also sent as the Women's Rights Representative from Singapore to the ASEAN Commission on the Promotion and Protection of the Rights of Women (ACWC) in Children in 2010.

Wong was inducted into the Singapore Women's Hall of Fame in 2014.
