= Lee Hsien Loong Cabinet =

Lee Hsien Loong Cabinet may refer to:

- First Lee Hsien Loong Cabinet, the cabinet formed by Lee Hsien Loong after Goh Chok Tong having stepped down
- Second Lee Hsien Loong Cabinet, the cabinet formed by Lee after the 2006 general election
- Third Lee Hsien Loong Cabinet, the cabinet formed by Lee after the 2011 general election
- Fourth Lee Hsien Loong Cabinet, the cabinet formed by Lee after the 2015 general election
- Fifth Lee Hsien Loong Cabinet, the cabinet formed by Lee after the 2020 general election
