= First Lee Hsien Loong Cabinet =

- 13th Cabinet of Singapore
- 2004—2006
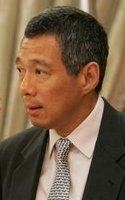
- Date formed: 12 August 2004
- Date dissolved: 29 May 2006

People and organisations
- Head of state: S. R. Nathan
- Head of government: Lee Hsien Loong
- Member party: People's Action Party
- Status in legislature: Supermajority
- Opposition party: Workers' Party
- Opposition leader: Low Thia Khiang

History
- Legislature term: 10th Parliament of Singapore
- Predecessor: Fourth Goh Chok Tong Cabinet
- Successor: Second Lee Hsien Loong Cabinet

The First Cabinet of Lee Hsien Loong of the Government of Singapore was sworn into office on 12 August 2004.

The swearing-in ceremony was held outdoors on the Istana grounds – instead of at City Hall where his two predecessors Lee Kuan Yew and Goh Chok Tong had held their ceremonies – in order to accommodate 1,400 invited guests representing different demographics of the population. S. Jayakumar was elevated to Deputy Prime Minister, while Tony Tan retained his DPM position – a post that he had held since his return to Cabinet in 1995. Lee Hsien Loong retained the Finance Minister post that he had held since 2001.

Lee's immediate predecessor, Goh Chok Tong, was named Senior Minister, and ranked second in order of precedence. Goh's predecessor, Lee Kuan Yew, who was the nation's first prime minister and Lee Hsien Loong's father, was subsequently named Minister Mentor.

== Cabinet ==
The First Lee Hsien Loong Cabinet was composed of the following members.

=== August 2004 – August 2005 ===
| Portfolio | Portrait | Name | Term |
|---|---|---|---|
| Prime Minister | | Lee Hsien Loong | 12 August 2004 – 15 May 2024 |
| Minister for Finance | | Lee Hsien Loong | 10 November 2001 – 30 November 2007 |
| Senior Minister | | Goh Chok Tong | 12 August 2004 – 20 May 2011 |
| Minister Mentor | | Lee Kuan Yew | 12 August 2004 – 20 May 2011 |
| Deputy Prime Minister | | Tony Tan | 1 August 1995 – 1 September 2005 |
| Coordinating Minister for Security and Defence | | Tony Tan | 1 August 2003 – 1 September 2005 |
| Deputy Prime Minister | S. Jayakumar | S. Jayakumar | 12 August 2004 – 1 April 2009 |
| Minister for Law | S. Jayakumar | S. Jayakumar | 12 September 1988 – 30 April 2008 |
| Minister for Home Affairs | Wong Kan Seng | Wong Kan Seng | 2 January 1994 – 31 October 2010 |
| Minister for Transport | | Yeo Cheow Tong | 23 November 2001 – 29 May 2006 |
| Minister for Foreign Affairs | George Yeo | George Yeo | 12 August 2004 – 20 May 2011 |
| Minister for Information, Communications and the Arts | | Lee Boon Yang | 12 May 2003 – 31 March 2009 |
| Minister for National Development | Mah Bow Tan | Mah Bow Tan | 2 June 1999 – 20 May 2011 |
| Minister in the Prime Minister's Office | Lim Boon Heng | Lim Boon Heng | 23 November 2001 – 20 May 2011 |
| Minister for Trade and Industry | Lim Hng Kiang | Lim Hng Kiang | 12 August 2004 – 30 September 2015 |
| Minister for Defence | Teo Chee Hean | Teo Chee Hean | 1 August 2003 – 20 May 2011 |
| Minister in the Prime Minister's Office | Lim Swee Say | Lim Swee Say | 12 August 2004 – 3 May 2015 |
| Second Minister for National Development | Lim Swee Say | Lim Swee Say | 12 August 2004 – 29 May 2006 |
| Minister for the Environment and Water Resources | Yaacob Ibrahim | Yaacob Ibrahim | 12 August 2004 – 20 May 2011 |
| Minister-in-charge of Muslim Affairs | Yaacob Ibrahim | Yaacob Ibrahim | 25 March 2002 – 30 April 2018 |
| Minister for Health | Khaw Boon Wan | Khaw Boon Wan | 12 August 2004 – 20 May 2011 |
| Minister for Education | Tharman Shanmugaratnam | Tharman Shanmugaratnam | 12 August 2004 – 31 March 2008 |
| Minister for Manpower | Ng Eng Hen | Ng Eng Hen | 12 August 2004 – 31 March 2008 |
| Second Minister for Education | Ng Eng Hen | Ng Eng Hen | 12 August 2004 – 30 June 2005 |
| Second Minister for Defence | Ng Eng Hen | Ng Eng Hen | 1 July 2005 – 20 May 2011 |
| Minister for Community Development, Youth and Sports | Vivian Balakrishnan | Vivian Balakrishnan | 1 April 2005 – 20 May 2011 |
| Acting Minister for Community Development, Youth and Sports | Vivian Balakrishnan | Vivian Balakrishnan | 12 August 2004 – 31 March 2005 |
| Second Minister for Trade and Industry | Vivian Balakrishnan | Vivian Balakrishnan | 1 April 2005 – 29 May 2006 |
| Minister in the Prime Minister's Office | | Raymond Lim | 1 April 2005 – 29 May 2006 |
| Second Minister for Finance | | Raymond Lim | 1 April 2005 – 29 May 2006 |
| Acting Second Minister for Finance | | Raymond Lim | 12 August 2004 – 31 March 2005 |
| Second Minister for Foreign Affairs | | Raymond Lim | 1 April 2005 – 20 May 2011 |

=== September 2005 – May 2006 ===
| Portfolio | Portrait | Name | Term |
|---|---|---|---|
| Prime Minister | | Lee Hsien Loong | 12 August 2004 – 15 May 2024 |
| Minister for Finance | | Lee Hsien Loong | 10 November 2001 – 30 November 2007 |
| Senior Minister | | Goh Chok Tong | 12 August 2004 – 20 May 2011 |
| Minister Mentor | | Lee Kuan Yew | 12 August 2004 – 20 May 2011 |
| Deputy Prime Minister | S. Jayakumar | S. Jayakumar | 12 August 2004 – 1 April 2009 |
| Coordinating Minister for National Security | S. Jayakumar | S. Jayakumar | 1 September 2005 – 1 November 2010 |
| Minister for Law | S. Jayakumar | S. Jayakumar | 12 September 1988 – 30 April 2008 |
| Deputy Prime Minister | Wong Kan Seng | Wong Kan Seng | 1 September 2005 – 20 May 2011 |
| Minister for Home Affairs | Wong Kan Seng | Wong Kan Seng | 2 January 1994 – 31 October 2010 |
| Minister for Transport | | Yeo Cheow Tong | 23 November 2001 – 29 May 2006 |
| Minister for Foreign Affairs | George Yeo | George Yeo | 12 August 2004 – 20 May 2011 |
| Minister for Information, Communications and the Arts | | Lee Boon Yang | 12 May 2003 – 31 March 2009 |
| Minister for National Development | Mah Bow Tan | Mah Bow Tan | 2 June 1999 – 20 May 2011 |
| Minister in the Prime Minister's Office | Lim Boon Heng | Lim Boon Heng | 23 November 2001 – 20 May 2011 |
| Minister for Trade and Industry | Lim Hng Kiang | Lim Hng Kiang | 12 August 2004 – 30 September 2015 |
| Minister for Defence | Teo Chee Hean | Teo Chee Hean | 1 August 2003 – 20 May 2011 |
| Minister in the Prime Minister's Office | Lim Swee Say | Lim Swee Say | 12 August 2004 – 3 May 2015 |
| Second Minister for National Development | Lim Swee Say | Lim Swee Say | 12 August 2004 – 30 September 2005 |
| Minister for the Environment and Water Resources | Yaacob Ibrahim | Yaacob Ibrahim | 12 August 2004 – 20 May 2011 |
| Minister-in-charge of Muslim Affairs | Yaacob Ibrahim | Yaacob Ibrahim | 25 March 2002 – 30 April 2018 |
| Minister for Health | Khaw Boon Wan | Khaw Boon Wan | 12 August 2004 – 20 May 2011 |
| Minister for Education | Tharman Shanmugaratnam | Tharman Shanmugaratnam | 12 August 2004 – 31 March 2008 |
| Minister for Manpower | Ng Eng Hen | Ng Eng Hen | 12 August 2004 – 31 March 2008 |
| Second Minister for Defence | Ng Eng Hen | Ng Eng Hen | 1 July 2005 – 20 May 2011 |
| Minister for Community Development, Youth and Sports | Vivian Balakrishnan | Vivian Balakrishnan | 1 April 2005 – 20 May 2011 |
| Second Minister for Trade and Industry | Vivian Balakrishnan | Vivian Balakrishnan | 1 April 2005 – 29 May 2006 |
| Minister in the Prime Minister's Office | | Raymond Lim | 1 April 2005 – 29 May 2006 |
| Second Minister for Finance | | Raymond Lim | 1 April 2005 – 29 May 2006 |
| Second Minister for Foreign Affairs | | Raymond Lim | 1 April 2005 – 20 May 2011 |

== List of office holders ==
The following is the list of office holders in the First Lee Hsien Loong Cabinet. Cabinet members are listed in bold.

Prime Minister's Office
| Office | Name | Term start | Term end |
|---|---|---|---|
| Prime Minister | **Lee Hsien Loong** | 12 August 2004 | 29 May 2006 |
| Senior Minister | **Goh Chok Tong** | 12 August 2004 | 29 May 2006 |
| Minister Mentor | **Lee Kuan Yew** | 12 August 2004 | 29 May 2006 |
| Deputy Prime Minister | **Tony Tan** | 12 August 2004 | 1 September 2005 |
| Deputy Prime Minister | **S. Jayakumar** | 12 August 2004 | 29 May 2006 |
| Deputy Prime Minister | **Wong Kan Seng** | 1 September 2005 | 29 May 2006 |
| Coordinating Minister for Security and Defence | **Tony Tan** | 12 August 2004 | 1 September 2005 |
| Coordinating Minister for National Security | **S. Jayakumar** | 1 September 2005 | 29 May 2006 |
| Minister in the Prime Minister's Office | **Lim Boon Heng** | 12 August 2004 | 29 May 2006 |
| Minister in the Prime Minister's Office | **Lim Swee Say** | 12 August 2004 | 29 May 2006 |
| Minister in the Prime Minister's Office | **Raymond Lim** | 1 April 2005 | 29 May 2006 |
| Minister of State for the Prime Minister's Office | Othman Haron Eusofe | 12 August 2004 | 30 June 2005 |
Minister for Community Development, Youth and Sports
| Office | Name | Term start | Term end |
| Minister for Community Development, Youth and Sports | **Vivian Balakrishnan** (Note: In an acting capacity until 31 March 2005.) | 12 August 2004 | 29 May 2006 |
| Minister of State for Community Development, Youth and Sports | Yu-Foo Yee Shoon | 12 August 2004 | 29 May 2006 |
| Parliamentary Secretary for Community Development, Youth and Sports | Maliki Osman | 12 August 2004 | 29 May 2006 |
Ministry of Defence
| Office | Name | Term start | Term end |
| Minister for Defence | **Teo Chee Hean** | 12 August 2004 | 29 May 2006 |
| Second Minister for Defence | **Ng Eng Hen** | 1 July 2005 | 29 May 2006 |
| Minister of State for Defence | Cedric Foo | 12 August 2004 | 30 April 2005 |
| Senior Parliamentary Secretary for Defence | Koo Tsai Kee | 12 August 2004 | 29 May 2006 |
Ministry of Education
| Office | Name | Term start | Term end |
| Minister for Education | **Tharman Shanmugaratnam** | 12 August 2004 | 29 May 2006 |
| Second Minister for Education | Ng Eng Hen | 12 August 2004 | 30 June 2005 |
| Minister of State for Education | Chan Soo Sen | 12 August 2004 | 29 May 2006 |
| Minister of State for Education | Gan Kim Yong | 1 October 2005 | 29 May 2006 |
| Senior Parliamentary Secretary for Education | Hawazi Daipi | 12 August 2004 | 29 May 2006 |
Ministry of the Environment and Water Resources
| Office | Name | Term start | Term end |
| Minister for the Environment and Water Resources | **Yaacob Ibrahim** (Note: Yaacob Ibrahim was concurrently the Minister-in-charge of Muslim Affairs.) | 12 August 2004 | 29 May 2006 |
| Senior Parliamentary Secretary for the Environment | Koo Tsai Kee | 12 August 2004 | 29 May 2006 |
Ministry of Finance
| Office | Name | Term start | Term end |
| Minister for Finance | **Lee Hsien Loong** | 12 August 2004 | 29 May 2006 |
| Second Minister for Finance | **Raymond Lim** | 12 August 2004 | 29 May 2006 |
| Minister of State for Finance | Lim Hwee Hua | 12 August 2004 | 29 May 2006 |
Ministry of Foreign Affairs
| Office | Name | Term start | Term end |
| Minister for Foreign Affairs | **George Yeo** | 12 August 2004 | 29 May 2006 |
| Second Minister for Foreign Affairs | **Raymond Lim** | 1 April 2005 | 29 May 2006 |
| Senior Minister of State for Foreign Affairs | Raymond Lim | 12 August 2004 | 31 March 2005 |
Ministry of Health
| Office | Name | Term start | Term end |
| Minister for Health | **Khaw Boon Wan** | 12 August 2004 | 29 May 2006 |
| Senior Minister of State for Health | Balaji Sadasivan | 12 August 2004 | 29 May 2006 |
| Parliamentary Secretary for Health | Maliki Osman | 12 August 2004 | 30 September 2005 |
Ministry of Home Affairs
| Office | Name | Term start | Term end |
| Minister for Home Affairs | **Wong Kan Seng** | 12 August 2004 | 29 May 2006 |
| Senior Minister of State for Home Affairs | Ho Peng Kee | 12 August 2004 | 29 May 2006 |
| Senior Parliamentary Secretary for Home Affairs | Mohamad Maidin Packer | 12 August 2004 | 29 May 2006 |
Minister for Information, Communications and the Arts
| Office | Name | Term start | Term end |
| Minister for Information, Communications and the Arts | **Lee Boon Yang** | 12 August 2004 | 29 May 2006 |
| Senior Minister of State for Information, Communications and the Arts | Balaji Sadasivan | 12 August 2004 | 29 May 2006 |
| Senior Parliamentary Secretary for Information, Communications and the Arts | Yatiman Yusof | 12 August 2004 | 29 May 2006 |
Ministry of Law
| Office | Name | Term start | Term end |
| Minister for Law | **S. Jayakumar** | 12 August 2004 | 29 May 2006 |
| Senior Minister of State for Law | Ho Peng Kee | 12 August 2004 | 29 May 2006 |
Minister for Manpower
| Office | Name | Term start | Term end |
| Minister for Manpower | **Ng Eng Hen** | 12 August 2004 | 29 May 2006 |
| Minister of State for Manpower | Gan Kim Yong | 1 October 2005 | 29 May 2006 |
| Senior Parliamentary Secretary for Manpower | Hawazi Daipi | 12 August 2004 | 29 May 2006 |
Ministry of National Development
| Office | Name | Term start | Term end |
| Minister for National Development | **Mah Bow Tan** | 12 August 2004 | 29 May 2006 |
| Second Minister for National Development | **Lim Swee Say** | 12 August 2004 | 30 September 2005 |
| Minister of State for National Development | Cedric Foo | 12 August 2004 | 30 April 2005 |
| Minister of State for National Development | Heng Chee How | 1 May 2005 | 29 May 2006 |
| Parliamentary Secretary for National Development | Maliki Osman | 1 October 2005 | 29 May 2006 |
Ministry of Trade and Industry
| Office | Name | Term start | Term end |
| Minister for Trade and Industry | **Lim Hng Kiang** | 12 August 2004 | 29 May 2006 |
| Second Minister for Trade and Industry | **Vivian Balakrishnan** | 1 April 2005 | 29 May 2006 |
| Senior Minister of State for Trade and Industry | Vivian Balakrishnan | 12 August 2004 | 31 March 2005 |
| Minister of State for Trade and Industry | Heng Chee How | 12 August 2004 | 30 September 2005 |
| Minister of State for Trade and Industry | Chan Soo Sen | 1 October 2005 | 29 May 2006 |
Ministry of Transport
| Office | Name | Term start | Term end |
| Minister for Transport | **Yeo Cheow Tong** | 12 August 2004 | 29 May 2006 |
| Minister of State for Transport | Lim Hwee Hua | 12 August 2004 | 29 May 2006 |
