= Second Goh Chok Tong Cabinet =

- 10th Cabinet of Singapore

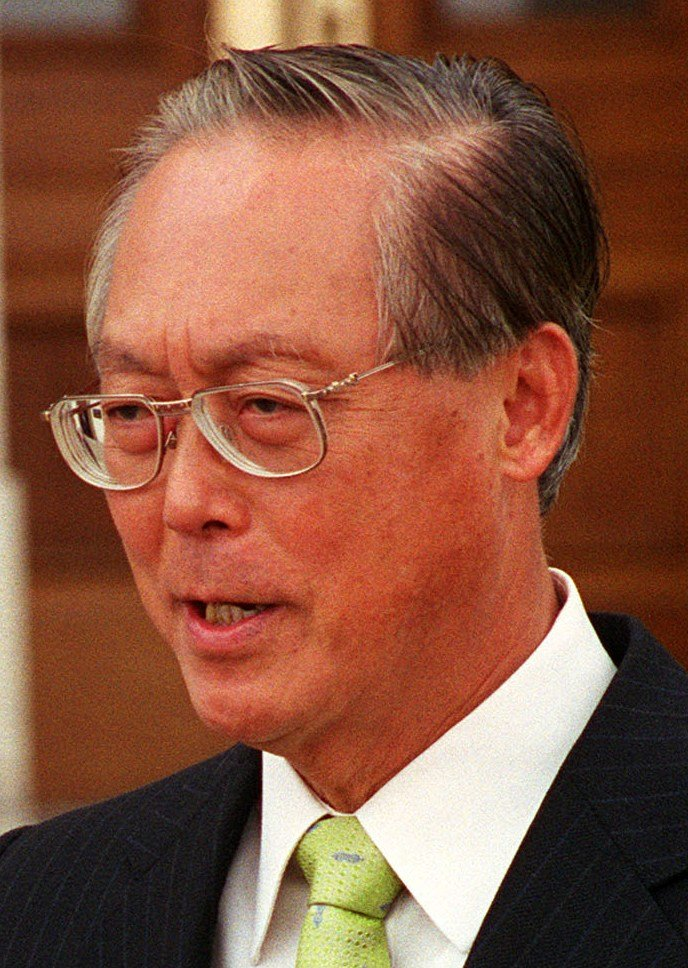
- Date formed: 7 September 1991
- Date dissolved: 24 January 1997

People and organisations
- Head of state: Wee Kim Wee (until 1 September 1993); Ong Teng Cheong (from 1 September 1993)
- Head of government: Goh Chok Tong
- Deputy head of government: Lee Hsien Loong; Ong Teng Cheong (until 16 August 1993); Tony Tan Keng Yam (from 1 August 1995)
- Member party: People's Action Party
- Status in legislature: Supermajority
- Opposition party: Singapore Democratic Party; Worker's Party
- Opposition leader: Chiam See Tong (until 6 August 1993); Ling How Doong (from 6 August 1993)

History
- Election: 1991
- Legislature term: 8th Parliament of Singapore
- Predecessor: First Goh Chok Tong Cabinet
- Successor: Third Goh Chok Tong Cabinet

The Second Goh Chok Tong Cabinet was formed after the 1991 Singaporean general election and dissolved for the 1997 Singaporean general election. The new Cabinet was formed due to Prime Minister, Goh Chok Tong, calling a snap election, seeking a strong and fresh mandate after succeeding Lee Kuan Yew as prime minister.

== Cabinet ==
The Second Goh Chok Tong Cabinet is composed of the following members.

Portfolio	Name	Term
Prime Minister	Goh Chok Tong	28 November 1990 – 12 August 2004
Senior Minister	Lee Kuan Yew	28 November 1990 – 21 May 2011
Deputy Prime Minister	Ong Teng Cheong	28 November 1990 – 16 August 1993
Deputy Prime Minister	Lee Hsien Loong	28 November 1990 – 12 August 2004
Deputy Prime Minister	Tony Tan	1 August 1995 – 1 September 2005
Minister in the Prime Minister's Office	Lee Boon Yang	1 July 1991 – 1 January 1992
Minister in the Prime Minister's Office	Lim Boon Heng	27 July 1993 – 10 October 1993
Minister for Trade and Industry	Lee Hsien Loong	1 January 1987 – 6 December 1992
Minister for Trade and Industry	S. Dhanabalan	7 December 1992 – 1 January 1994
Minister for Trade and Industry	Yeo Cheow Tong	2 January 1994 – 24 January 1997
Second Minister for Trade and Industry	Lim Boon Heng	27 July 1993 – 10 October 1993
Minister for National Development	S. Dhanabalan	1 January 1987 – 31 August 1992
Minister for National Development	Richard Hu	1 September 1992 – 1 January 1994
Minister for National Development	Lim Hng Kiang (Note: In an acting capacity until 16 April 1995.)	2 January 1994 – 16 April 1995 (acting), 17 April 1995 – 2 June 1999
Minister for Education	Tony Tan	2 January 1985 – 1 January 1992
Minister for Education	Lee Yock Suan	2 January 1992 – 24 January 1997
Second Minister for Education	Lee Yock Suan	7 September 1991 – 1 January 1992
Ministry for the Environment	Ahmad Mattar	2 January 1985 – 30 June 1993
Ministry for the Environment	Mah Bow Tan	1 July 1993 – 16 April 1995
Ministry for the Environment	Teo Chee Hean (Note: In an acting capacity until 14 January 1996.)	17 April 1995 – 14 January 1996 (acting), 15 January 1996 – 24 January 1997
Minister-in-charge of Muslim Affairs	Ahmad Mattar	5 September 1977 – 30 June 1993
Minister-in-charge of Muslim Affairs	Abdullah Tarmugi	1 July 1993 – 24 March 2002
Minister for Defence	Yeo Ning Hong	1 July 1991 – 1 July 1994
Minister for Defence	Lee Boon Yang	2 July 1994 – 31 July 1995
Minister for Defence	Tony Tan	1 August 1995 – 31 July 2003
Second Minister for Defence	Lee Boon Yang	1 July 1991 – 1 July 1994
Second Minister for Defence	Teo Chee Hean	15 January 1996 – 31 July 2003
Minister for Law	S. Jayakumar	13 September 1988 – 30 April 2008
Minister for Home Affairs	S. Jayakumar	2 January 1985 – 1 January 1994
Minister for Home Affairs	Wong Kan Seng	2 January 1994 – 31 October 2010
Minister for Finance	Richard Hu	7 May 1985 – 9 November 2001
Minister for Labour	Lee Yock Suan	1 January 1987 – 1 January 1992
Minister for Labour	Lee Boon Yang	2 January 1992 – 31 March 1998
Minister for Foreign Affairs	Wong Kan Seng	13 September 1988 – 1 January 1994
Minister for Foreign Affairs	S. Jayakumar	2 January 1994 – 11 August 2004
Second Minister for Foreign Affairs	George Yeo	1 July 1991 – 1 January 1994
Second Minister for Foreign Affairs	Lim Hng Kiang	17 April 1995 – 22 November 2001
Minister for Health	Yeo Cheow Tong	28 November 1990 – 1 January 1994
Minister for Health	George Yeo	2 January 1994 – 24 January 1997
Minister for Community Development	Yeo Cheow Tong	7 September 1991 – 1 January 1994
Minister for Community Development	Abdullah Tarmugi	2 January 1994 – 14 January 1996 (acting), 15 January 1996 – 31 March 2000
Minister for Information and the Arts	George Yeo	1 July 1991 – 2 June 1999
Minister for Communications	Mah Bow Tan	7 September 1991 – 2 June 1999
Minister without portfolio	Lim Boon Heng	10 October 1993 – 22 November 2001

== List of ministers ==
The following is the list of ministers in the Second Goh Chok Tong Cabinet. Cabinet members are listed in bold.

Prime Minister's Office
Office	Name	Term start	Term end
Prime Minister	**Goh Chok Tong**	7 September 1991	24 January 1997
Senior Minister	**Lee Kuan Yew**	7 September 1991	24 January 1997
Deputy Prime Minister	**Ong Teng Cheong**	7 September 1991	16 August 1993
Deputy Prime Minister	**Lee Hsien Loong**	7 September 1991	24 January 1997
Deputy Prime Minister	**Tony Tan**	1 August 1995	24 January 1997
Minister in the Prime Minister's Office	**Lee Boon Yang**	7 September 1991	1 January 1992
Minister in the Prime Minister's Office	**Lim Boon Heng**	27 July 1993	10 October 1993
Minister without portfolio	**Lim Boon Heng**	11 October 1993	24 January 1997
Ministry of Communications
Office	Name	Term start	Term end
Minister for Communications	**Mah Bow Tan**	7 September 1991	24 January 1997
Minister of State for Communications	Teo Chee Hean	21 December 1992	1 July 1994
Minister of State for Communications	Goh Chee Wee	2 July 1994	24 January 1997
Ministry of Community Development
Office	Name	Term start	Term end
Minister for Community Development	**Yeo Cheow Tong**	7 September 1991	1 January 1994
Minister for Community Development	**Abdullah Tarmugi (Note: In an acting capacity until 14 January 1996.)**	2 January 1994	24 January 1997
Senior Minister of State for Community Development	Ch'ng Jit Koon	7 September 1991	24 January 1997
Ministry of Defence
Office	Name	Term start	Term end
Minister for Defence	**Yeo Ning Hong**	7 September 1991	1 July 1994
Minister for Defence	**Lee Boon Yang**	2 July 1994	31 July 1995
Minister for Defence	**Tony Tan**	1 August 1995	24 January 1997
Second Minister for Defence	**Lee Boon Yang**	7 September 1991	1 July 1994
Second Minister for Defence	**Teo Chee Hean**	15 January 1996	24 January 1997
Senior Minister of State for Defence	Teo Chee Hean	17 April 1995	14 January 1996
Minister of State for Defence	Teo Chee Hean	2 July 1994	16 April 1995
Senior Parliamentary Secretary for Defence	Matthias Yao	2 January 1994	24 January 1997
Parliamentary Secretary for Defence	Matthias Yao	7 September 1991	1 January 1994
Ministry of Education
Office	Name	Term start	Term end
Minister for Education	**Tony Tan**	7 September 1991	1 January 1992
Minister for Education	**Lee Yock Suan**	2 January 1992	24 January 1997
Second Minister for Education	**Lee Yock Suan**	7 September 1991	1 January 1992
Senior Minister of State for Education	Tay Eng Soon	7 September 1991	5 August 1993
Senior Minister of State for Education	Aline Wong	17 April 1995	24 January 1997
Senior Minister of State for Education	Sidek Saniff	15 January 1996	24 January 1997
Minister of State for Education	Sidek Saniff	7 September 1991	14 January 1996
Minister of State for Education	Ker Sin Tze	2 January 1992	31 August 1994
Minister of State for Education	Aline Wong	2 January 1994	16 April 1995
Ministry of the Environment
Office	Name	Term start	Term end
Ministry for the Environment	**Ahmad Mattar**	7 September 1991	30 June 1993
Ministry for the Environment	**Mah Bow Tan**	1 July 1993	16 April 1995
Ministry for the Environment	**Teo Chee Hean**	17 April 1995	24 January 1997
Minister of State for the Environment	Abdullah Tarmugi	1 July 1993	16 April 1995
Senior Parliamentary Secretary for the Environment	Ho Kah Leong	2 January 1994	24 January 1997
Ministry of Finance
Office	Name	Term start	Term end
Minister for Finance	**Richard Hu**	7 September 1991	24 January 1997
Minister of State for Finance	Teo Chee Hean	21 December 1992	16 April 1995
Parliamentary Secretary for Finance	Koo Tsai Kee	1 July 1995	24 January 1997
Ministry of Foreign Affairs
Office	Name	Term start	Term end
Minister for Foreign Affairs	**Wong Kan Seng**	7 September 1991	1 January 1994
Minister for Foreign Affairs	**S. Jayakumar**	2 January 1994	24 January 1997
Second Minister for Foreign Affairs	**George Yeo**	7 September 1991	1 January 1994
Second Minister for Foreign Affairs	**Lim Hng Kiang**	17 April 1995	24 January 1997
Senior Minister of State for Foreign Affairs	Lim Hng Kiang	2 January 1994	16 April 1995
Senior Parliamentary Secretary for Foreign Affairs	Yatiman Yusof	15 January 1996	24 January 1997
Parliamentary Secretary for Foreign Affairs	Yatiman Yusof	7 September 1991	14 January 1996
Ministry of Health
Office	Name	Term start	Term end
Minister for Health	**Yeo Cheow Tong**	7 September 1991	1 January 1994
Minister for Health	**George Yeo**	2 January 1994	24 January 1997
Senior Minister of State for Health	Aline Wong	17 April 1995	24 January 1997
Minister of State for Health	Aline Wong	7 September 1991	16 April 1995
Ministry of Home Affairs
Office	Name	Term start	Term end
Minister for Home Affairs	**S. Jayakumar**	7 September 1991	1 January 1994
Minister for Home Affairs	**Wong Kan Seng**	2 January 1994	24 January 1997
Senior Minister of State for Home Affairs	Abdullah Tarmugi	17 April 1995	14 January 1996
Senior Parliamentary Secretary for Home Affairs	Ho Peng Kee	15 January 1996	24 January 1997
Parliamentary Secretary for Home Affairs	Ong Chit Chung	7 September 1991	30 June 1993
Parliamentary Secretary for Home Affairs	Ho Peng Kee	1 August 1993	14 January 1996
Ministry for Information and the Arts
Office	Name	Term start	Term end
Minister for Information and the Arts	**George Yeo**	7 September 1991	24 January 1997
Minister of State for Information and the Arts	Ker Sin Tze	2 January 1992	31 August 1994
Senior Parliamentary Secretary for Information and the Arts	Ho Kah Leong	7 September 1991	1 January 1994
Parliamentary Secretary for Information and the Arts	Mohamad Maidin Packer	7 September 1991	24 January 1997
Ministry of Labour
Office	Name	Term start	Term end
Minister for Labour	**Lee Yock Suan**	7 September 1991	1 January 1992
Minister for Labour	**Lee Boon Yang**	2 January 1992	24 January 1997
Minister of State for Labour	Goh Chee Wee	11 October 1993	1 July 1994
Senior Parliamentary Secretary for Labour	Lee Yiok Seng	2 January 1994	24 January 1997
Parliamentary Secretary for Labour	Ong Chit Chung	7 September 1991	30 June 1993
Ministry of Law
Office	Name	Term start	Term end
Minister for Law	**S. Jayakumar**	7 September 1991	24 January 1997
Senior Parliamentary Secretary for Law	Ho Peng Kee	15 January 1996	24 January 1997
Parliamentary Secretary for Law	Ho Peng Kee	1 August 1993	14 January 1996
Ministry of National Development
Office	Name	Term start	Term end
Minister for National Development	**S. Dhanabalan**	7 September 1991	31 August 1992
Minister for National Development	**Richard Hu**	1 September 1992	1 January 1994
Minister for National Development	**Lim Hng Kiang** (Note: In an acting capacity until 16 April 1995.)	2 January 1994	24 January 1997
Minister of State for National Development	Lim Hng Kiang	7 September 1991	1 January 1994
Senior Parliamentary Secretary for National Development	Lee Yiok Seng	7 September 1991	1 January 1994
Senior Parliamentary Secretary for National Development	Matthias Yao	2 January 1994	24 January 1997
Ministry of Trade and Industry
Office	Name	Term start	Term end
Minister for Trade and Industry	**Lee Hsien Loong**	7 September 1991	6 December 1992
Minister for Trade and Industry	**S. Dhanabalan**	7 December 1992	1 January 1994
Minister for Trade and Industry	**Yeo Cheow Tong**	2 January 1994	24 January 1997
Second Minister for Trade and Industry	**Lim Boon Heng**	27 July 1993	10 October 1993
Senior Minister for Trade and Industry	Lim Boon Heng	7 September 1991	26 July 1993
Minister of State for Trade and Industry	Goh Chee Wee	11 October 1993	24 January 1997
