= GovTech Singapore =

Statutory board of the Singapore government

Agency overview
- Formed: 1 October 2016; 10 years ago
- Preceding agency: National Computer Board (NCB) Telecommunication Authority of Singapore (TAS) Infocomm Development Authority of Singapore (IDA)
- Jurisdiction: Government of Singapore
- Headquarters: 82 Punggol Way, Singapore 829910
- Annual budget: S$238.93 million (2017)
- Minister responsible: Jasmin Lau, (Minister In Charge of GovTech) Minister of State for Digital Development and Information & Minister of State for Education
- Agency executives: Joseph Leong, Chairman; Goh Wei Boon, CEO; Chang Sau Sheong, Deputy Chief Executive (Product and Engineering, TMO / CODE); Henry Chang, Deputy Chief Executive (Services, Governance and Cybersecurity)
- Parent agency: Ministry of Digital Development and Information
- Website: tech.gov.sg
- Agency ID: T16GB0002G

The Government Technology Agency of Singapore (GovTech Singapore) is a statutory board of the Government of Singapore, under the Ministry of Digital Development and Information (MDDI). It was restructured from Infocomm Development Authority of Singapore (IMDA) in 2016, and officially legislated in Parliament on 18 August that year.

== Overview ==
GovTech is responsible for the delivery of the Singapore government's digital services to the public. It is the agency that provides the infrastructure to support the implementation of the country's Smart Nation initiative to utilise infocomm technologies, networks and big data to create tech-enabled solutions.

The Government Chief Information Office (GCIO) is under GovTech.

Its sub-unit Open Government Products (OGP) develops pieces of software for the government. As of 2022, Lee Hsien Loong's son Li Hongyi serves as the director of OGP.

== History ==
On 1 May 2017, GovTech was moved from the Ministry of Communications and Information (MCI) to the Prime Minister's Office (PMO) as the implementing agency of the newly formed Smart Nation and Digital Government Office (SNDGO); together they formed the Smart Nation and Digital Government Group (SNDGG).

On 1 June 2023, Goh Wei Boon replaced Kok Ping Soon as the chief executive of GovTech. Goh was previously the CEO of the Centre for Strategic Infocomm Technologies.

In September 2023, following claims on Reddit that GovTech had made offers of employment to about 60 former Indeed employees who had recently been laid off at "inflated" salaries and that the new hires had "no deliverables", GovTech confirmed that it had hired 60 former employees of Indeed. It explained that it had taken "a more agile hiring approach that balances speed with responsible hiring" and that every candidate had been interviewed as part of the hiring process and the remuneration offered took into consideration the candidates' equivalent grades within Indeed.

In October 2023, SNDGG merged with MCI's digital development functions to form an enlarged Smart Nation group, which remained part of the PMO but was administered by MCI. The status of statutory boards under both entities, including GovTech, was unchanged. On 8 July 2024, MCI was renamed the Ministry of Digital Development and Information (MDDI), under which GovTech is a statutory board.

In July 2026, GovTech announced a two-year workforce restructuring as it shifted from a project-delivery model to one focused on continuous product ownership. The agency said that 7 to 9 per cent of its workforce would be affected. In the first phase, 93 officers left the agency, while more than 200 others were retained, redeployed or placed on full-pay apprenticeships.

== See also ==
- Info-communications Media Development Authority
- Cyber Security Agency (Singapore)
