= Second Lee Hsien Loong Cabinet =

Cabinet of Singapore from 2006 to 2011

- 14th Cabinet of Singapore
- 2006–2011
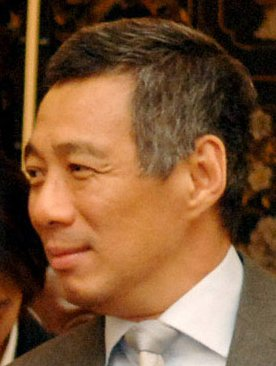
- Date formed: 30 May 2006
- Date dissolved: 20 May 2011

People and organisations
- Head of state: S. R. Nathan
- Head of government: Lee Hsien Loong
- Member party: People's Action Party
- Status in legislature: Supermajority
- Opposition party: Workers' Party
- Opposition leader: Low Thia Khiang

History
- Election: 6 May 2006
- Legislature term: 11th
- Predecessor: First Lee Hsien Loong Cabinet
- Successor: Third Lee Hsien Loong Cabinet

The Second Cabinet of Lee Hsien Loong of the Government of Singapore was sworn into office on 30 May 2006, following the 2006 general election for the 11th Parliament. As was the case previously, the Cabinet was made up exclusively of Members of Parliament from the governing People's Action Party (PAP).

== Cabinet ==
=== August 2006 – March 2008 ===
Prime Minister Lee Hsien Loong made few changes in his administration. In the only change at the ministerial level, Raymond Lim was promoted to be the Minister for Transport replacing Yeo Cheow Tong. Five new faces were sworn into political office, namely Lui Tuck Yew, Lee Yi Shyan, Grace Fu, Teo Ser Luck and Masagos Zulkifli. They hold the roles of Minister of State or Parliamentary secretaries in political office. Minister for Education Tharman Shanmugaratnam was given another role as Second Minister for Finance. Transport Minister Raymond Lim relinquished his roles as Second Minister for Finance and Minister in the Prime Minister's Office. Minister for Community Development, Youth and Sports Vivian Balakrishnan also had a second post as Second Minister for Information, Communications and the Arts as he relinquished his Second Minister for Trade and Industry portfolio.

The Cabinet of Singapore 2006 consisted of the following persons:

Portfolio	Portrait	Name	Term
Prime Minister	Lee Hsien Loong	Lee Hsien Loong	12 August 2004 – 15 May 2024
Minister for Finance	Lee Hsien Loong	Lee Hsien Loong	10 November 2001 – 30 November 2007
Senior Minister	Goh Chok Tong	Goh Chok Tong	12 August 2004 – 20 May 2011
Minister Mentor	Lee Kuan Yew	Lee Kuan Yew	12 August 2004 – 20 May 2011
Deputy Prime Minister	S. Jayakumar	S. Jayakumar	12 August 2004 – 31 March 2009
Coordinating Minister for National Security	S. Jayakumar	S. Jayakumar	1 September 2005 – 31 October 2010
Minister for Law	S. Jayakumar	S. Jayakumar	12 September 1988 – 30 April 2008
Deputy Prime Minister	Wong Kan Seng	Wong Kan Seng	1 September 2005 – 20 May 2011
Minister for Home Affairs	Wong Kan Seng	Wong Kan Seng	2 January 1994 – 31 October 2010
Minister for Foreign Affairs	George Yeo	George Yeo	12 August 2004 – 20 May 2011
Minister for Information, Communications and the Arts		Lee Boon Yang	12 May 2003 – 31 March 2009
Minister for National Development	Mah Bow Tan	Mah Bow Tan	2 June 1999 – 20 May 2011
Minister in the Prime Minister's Office	Lim Boon Heng	Lim Boon Heng	23 November 2001 – 20 May 2011
Minister for Trade and Industry	Lim Hng Kiang	Lim Hng Kiang	12 August 2004 – 30 September 2015
Minister for Defence	Teo Chee Hean	Teo Chee Hean	1 August 2003 – 20 May 2011
Minister in the Prime Minister's Office	Lim Swee Say	Lim Swee Say	12 August 2004 – 3 May 2015
Minister for the Environment and Water Resources	Yaacob Ibrahim	Yaacob Ibrahim	12 August 2004 – 20 May 2011
Minister-in-charge of Muslim Affairs	Yaacob Ibrahim	Yaacob Ibrahim	25 March 2002 – 30 April 2018
Minister for Health	Khaw Boon Wan	Khaw Boon Wan	12 August 2004 – 20 May 2011
Minister for Education	Tharman Shanmugaratnam	Tharman Shanmugaratnam	12 August 2004 – 31 March 2008
Minister for Finance	Tharman Shanmugaratnam	Tharman Shanmugaratnam	1 December 2007 – 30 September 2015
Second Minister for Finance	Tharman Shanmugaratnam	Tharman Shanmugaratnam	30 May 2006 – 30 November 2007
Minister for Manpower	Ng Eng Hen	Ng Eng Hen	12 August 2004 – 31 March 2008
Second Minister for Defence	Ng Eng Hen	Ng Eng Hen	1 July 2005 – 20 May 2011
Minister for Community Development, Youth and Sports	Vivian Balakrishnan	Vivian Balakrishnan	1 April 2005 – 20 May 2011
Second Minister for Information, Communications and the Arts	Vivian Balakrishnan	Vivian Balakrishnan	30 May 2006 – 31 March 2008
Minister for Transport		Raymond Lim	30 May 2006 – 20 May 2011
Second Minister for Foreign Affairs		Raymond Lim	1 April 2005 – 20 May 2011

=== April 2008 – March 2009 ===
A Cabinet reshuffle took place effective as of April 2008.

Portfolio	Portrait	Name	Term
Prime Minister	Lee Hsien Loong	Lee Hsien Loong	12 August 2004 – 15 May 2024
Senior Minister	Goh Chok Tong	Goh Chok Tong	12 August 2004 – 20 May 2011
Minister Mentor	Lee Kuan Yew	Lee Kuan Yew	12 August 2004 – 20 May 2011
Deputy Prime Minister	S. Jayakumar	S. Jayakumar	12 August 2004 – 31 March 2009
Coordinating Minister for National Security	S. Jayakumar	S. Jayakumar	1 September 2005 – 31 October 2010
Minister for Law	S. Jayakumar	S. Jayakumar	12 September 1988 – 30 April 2008
Deputy Prime Minister	Wong Kan Seng	Wong Kan Seng	1 September 2005 – 20 May 2011
Minister for Home Affairs	Wong Kan Seng	Wong Kan Seng	2 January 1994 – 31 October 2010
Minister for Foreign Affairs	George Yeo	George Yeo	12 August 2004 – 20 May 2011
Minister for Information, Communications and the Arts		Lee Boon Yang	12 May 2003 – 31 March 2009
Minister for National Development	Mah Bow Tan	Mah Bow Tan	2 June 1999 – 20 May 2011
Minister in the Prime Minister's Office	Lim Boon Heng	Lim Boon Heng	23 November 2001 – 20 May 2011
Minister for Trade and Industry	Lim Hng Kiang	Lim Hng Kiang	12 August 2004 – 30 September 2015
Minister for Defence	Teo Chee Hean	Teo Chee Hean	1 August 2003 – 20 May 2011
Minister in the Prime Minister's Office	Lim Swee Say	Lim Swee Say	12 August 2004 – 3 May 2015
Minister for the Environment and Water Resources	Yaacob Ibrahim	Yaacob Ibrahim	12 August 2004 – 20 May 2011
Minister-in-charge of Muslim Affairs	Yaacob Ibrahim	Yaacob Ibrahim	25 March 2002 – 30 April 2018
Minister for Health	Khaw Boon Wan	Khaw Boon Wan	12 August 2004 – 20 May 2011
Minister for Finance	Tharman Shanmugaratnam	Tharman Shanmugaratnam	1 December 2007 – 30 September 2015
Minister for Education	Ng Eng Hen	Ng Eng Hen	1 April 2008 – 20 May 2011
Second Minister for Defence	Ng Eng Hen	Ng Eng Hen	1 July 2005 – 20 May 2011
Minister for Community Development, Youth and Sports	Vivian Balakrishnan	Vivian Balakrishnan	1 April 2005 – 20 May 2011
Minister for Transport		Raymond Lim	30 May 2006 – 20 May 2011
Second Minister for Foreign Affairs		Raymond Lim	1 April 2005 – 20 May 2011
Minister for Law	K. Shanmugam	K. Shanmugam	1 May 2008 – 22 May 2025
Second Minister for Home Affairs	K. Shanmugam	K. Shanmugam	1 May 2008 – 31 October 2010
Acting Minister for Manpower	Gan Kim Yong	Gan Kim Yong	1 April 2008 – 31 March 2009

=== April 2009 – October 2010 ===
A Cabinet reshuffle took place effective as of April 2009. Professor S. Jayakumar relinquished his post of Deputy Prime Minister, and was replaced by Teo Chee Hean. Gan Kim Yong was appointed Minister for Manpower after a year as Acting Minister, and Lim Hwee Hua took up the post of Minister in the Prime Minister's Office, becoming the first woman in Singapore to become a full minister.

As of 1 April 2009, the Cabinet of Singapore consisted of the following persons:

Portfolio	Portrait	Name	Term
Prime Minister	Lee Hsien Loong	Lee Hsien Loong	12 August 2004 – 15 May 2024
Senior Minister	Goh Chok Tong	Goh Chok Tong	12 August 2004 – 20 May 2011
Minister Mentor	Lee Kuan Yew	Lee Kuan Yew	12 August 2004 – 20 May 2011
Senior Minister	S. Jayakumar	S. Jayakumar	1 April 2009 – 20 May 2011
Coordinating Minister for National Security	S. Jayakumar	S. Jayakumar	1 September 2005 – 31 October 2010
Deputy Prime Minister	Wong Kan Seng	Wong Kan Seng	1 September 2005 – 20 May 2011
Minister for Home Affairs	Wong Kan Seng	Wong Kan Seng	2 January 1994 – 31 October 2010
Deputy Prime Minister	Teo Chee Hean	Teo Chee Hean	1 April 2009 – 30 April 2019
Minister for Defence	Teo Chee Hean	Teo Chee Hean	1 August 2003 – 20 May 2011
Minister for Foreign Affairs	George Yeo	George Yeo	12 August 2004 – 20 May 2011
Minister for National Development	Mah Bow Tan	Mah Bow Tan	2 June 1999 – 20 May 2011
Minister in the Prime Minister's Office	Lim Boon Heng	Lim Boon Heng	23 November 2001 – 20 May 2011
Minister for Trade and Industry	Lim Hng Kiang	Lim Hng Kiang	12 August 2004 – 30 September 2015
Minister in the Prime Minister's Office	Lim Swee Say	Lim Swee Say	12 August 2004 – 3 May 2015
Minister for the Environment and Water Resources	Yaacob Ibrahim	Yaacob Ibrahim	12 August 2004 – 20 May 2011
Minister-in-charge of Muslim Affairs	Yaacob Ibrahim	Yaacob Ibrahim	25 March 2002 – 30 April 2018
Minister for Health	Khaw Boon Wan	Khaw Boon Wan	12 August 2004 – 20 May 2011
Minister for Finance	Tharman Shanmugaratnam	Tharman Shanmugaratnam	1 December 2007 – 30 September 2015
Minister for Education	Ng Eng Hen	Ng Eng Hen	1 April 2008 – 20 May 2011
Second Minister for Defence	Ng Eng Hen	Ng Eng Hen	1 July 2005 – 20 May 2011
Minister for Community Development, Youth and Sports	Vivian Balakrishnan	Vivian Balakrishnan	1 April 2005 – 20 May 2011
Minister for Transport		Raymond Lim	30 May 2006 – 20 May 2011
Second Minister for Foreign Affairs		Raymond Lim	1 April 2005 – 20 May 2011
Minister for Law	K. Shanmugam	K. Shanmugam	1 May 2008 – 22 May 2025
Second Minister for Home Affairs	K. Shanmugam	K. Shanmugam	1 May 2008 – 31 October 2010
Minister for Manpower	Gan Kim Yong	Gan Kim Yong	1 April 2009 – 20 May 2011
Minister in the Prime Minister's Office	Lim Hwee Hua	Lim Hwee Hua	1 April 2009 – 20 May 2011
Second Minister for Finance	Lim Hwee Hua	Lim Hwee Hua	1 April 2009 – 20 May 2011
Second Minister for Transport	Lim Hwee Hua	Lim Hwee Hua	1 April 2009 – 20 May 2011
Acting Minister for Information, Communications and the Arts	Lui Tuck Yew	Lui Tuck Yew	1 April 2009 – 31 October 2010

=== November 2010 – May 2011 ===
In October 2010, a further "minor adjustment" was announced. Senior Minister S. Jayakumar relinquished his post of Co-ordinating Minister for National Security, which was taken up by Deputy Prime Minister Wong Kan Seng. In turn, Wong gave up his Home Affairs portfolio in favour of Minister for Law K. Shanmugam. Lui Tuck Yew was promoted to full minister in the Ministry of Information, Communications and the Arts. Thus, as of 1 November 2010, the Cabinet of Singapore consisted of the persons listed in the table below.

Portfolio	Portrait	Name	Term
Prime Minister	Lee Hsien Loong	Lee Hsien Loong	12 August 2004 – 15 May 2024
Senior Minister	Goh Chok Tong	Goh Chok Tong	12 August 2004 – 20 May 2011
Minister Mentor	Lee Kuan Yew	Lee Kuan Yew	12 August 2004 – 20 May 2011
Senior Minister	S. Jayakumar	S. Jayakumar	1 April 2009 – 20 May 2011
Deputy Prime Minister	Wong Kan Seng	Wong Kan Seng	1 September 2005 – 20 May 2011
Coordinating Minister for National Security	Wong Kan Seng	Wong Kan Seng	1 November 2010 – 20 May 2011
Deputy Prime Minister	Teo Chee Hean	Teo Chee Hean	1 April 2009 – 30 April 2019
Minister for Defence	Teo Chee Hean	Teo Chee Hean	1 August 2003 – 20 May 2011
Minister for Foreign Affairs	George Yeo	George Yeo	12 August 2004 – 20 May 2011
Minister for National Development	Mah Bow Tan	Mah Bow Tan	2 June 1999 – 20 May 2011
Minister in the Prime Minister's Office	Lim Boon Heng	Lim Boon Heng	23 November 2001 – 20 May 2011
Minister for Trade and Industry	Lim Hng Kiang	Lim Hng Kiang	12 August 2004 – 30 September 2015
Minister in the Prime Minister's Office	Lim Swee Say	Lim Swee Say	12 August 2004 – 3 May 2015
Minister for the Environment and Water Resources	Yaacob Ibrahim	Yaacob Ibrahim	12 August 2004 – 20 May 2011
Minister-in-charge of Muslim Affairs	Yaacob Ibrahim	Yaacob Ibrahim	25 March 2002 – 30 April 2018
Minister for Health	Khaw Boon Wan	Khaw Boon Wan	12 August 2004 – 20 May 2011
Minister for Finance	Tharman Shanmugaratnam	Tharman Shanmugaratnam	1 December 2007 – 30 September 2015
Minister for Education	Ng Eng Hen	Ng Eng Hen	1 April 2008 – 20 May 2011
Second Minister for Defence	Ng Eng Hen	Ng Eng Hen	1 July 2005 – 20 May 2011
Minister for Community Development, Youth and Sports	Vivian Balakrishnan	Vivian Balakrishnan	1 April 2005 – 20 May 2011
Minister for Transport		Raymond Lim	30 May 2006 – 20 May 2011
Second Minister for Foreign Affairs		Raymond Lim	1 April 2005 – 20 May 2011
Minister for Home Affairs	K. Shanmugam	K. Shanmugam	1 November 2010 – 20 May 2011
Minister for Law	K. Shanmugam	K. Shanmugam	1 May 2008 – 22 May 2025
Minister for Manpower	Gan Kim Yong	Gan Kim Yong	1 April 2009 – 20 May 2011
Minister in the Prime Minister's Office	Lim Hwee Hua	Lim Hwee Hua	1 April 2009 – 20 May 2011
Second Minister for Finance	Lim Hwee Hua	Lim Hwee Hua	1 April 2009 – 20 May 2011
Second Minister for Transport	Lim Hwee Hua	Lim Hwee Hua	1 April 2009 – 20 May 2011
Minister for Information, Communications and the Arts	Lui Tuck Yew	Lui Tuck Yew	1 November 2010 – 20 May 2011

== List of office holders ==
The following is the list of appointments in the Second Lee Hsien Loong Cabinet. Cabinet members are listed in bold.

Prime Minister's Office
Office	Name	Term start	Term end
Prime Minister	**Lee Hsien Loong**	30 May 2006	20 May 2011
Senior Minister	**Goh Chok Tong**	30 May 2006	20 May 2011
Senior Minister	**S. Jayakumar**	1 April 2009	20 May 2011
Minister Mentor	**Lee Kuan Yew**	30 May 2006	20 May 2011
Deputy Prime Minister	**S. Jayakumar**	30 May 2006	31 March 2009
Deputy Prime Minister	**Wong Kan Seng**	30 May 2006	20 May 2011
Deputy Prime Minister	**Teo Chee Hean**	1 April 2009	20 May 2011
Coordinating Minister for National Security	**S. Jayakumar**	30 May 2006	31 October 2010
Coordinating Minister for National Security	**Wong Kan Seng**	1 November 2010	20 May 2011
Minister in the Prime Minister's Office	**Lim Boon Heng**	30 May 2006	20 May 2011
Minister in the Prime Minister's Office	**Lim Swee Say**	30 May 2006	20 May 2011
Minister in the Prime Minister's Office	**Lim Hwee Hua**	1 April 2009	20 May 2011
Minister of State in the Prime Minister's Office	Heng Chee How	1 April 2008	20 May 2011
Minister for Community Development, Youth and Sports
Office	Name	Term start	Term end
Minister for Community Development, Youth and Sports	**Vivian Balakrishnan**	30 May 2006	20 May 2011
Minister of State for Community Development, Youth and Sports	Yu-Foo Yee Shoon	30 May 2006	20 May 2011
Senior Parliamentary Secretary for Community Development, Youth and Sports	Teo Ser Luck	1 April 2008	20 May 2011
Parliamentary Secretary for Community Development, Youth and Sports	Teo Ser Luck	30 May 2006	31 March 2008
Ministry of Defence
Office	Name	Term start	Term end
Minister for Defence	**Teo Chee Hean**	30 May 2006	20 May 2011
Second Minister for Defence	**Ng Eng Hen**	30 May 2006	20 May 2011
Minister of State for Defence	Koo Tsai Kee	30 May 2006	20 May 2011
Ministry of Education
Office	Name	Term start	Term end
Minister for Education	**Tharman Shanmugaratnam**	30 May 2006	31 March 2008
Minister for Education	**Ng Eng Hen**	1 April 2008	20 May 2011
Senior Minister of State for Education	Lui Tuck Yew	1 April 2008	31 March 2009
Senior Minister of State for Education	S. Iswaran	1 April 2009	20 May 2011
Minister of State for Education	Gan Kim Yong	30 May 2006	31 March 2008
Minister of State for Education	Lui Tuck Yew	30 May 2006	31 March 2008
Minister of State for Education	Masagos Zulkifli	1 November 2010	20 May 2011
Senior Parliamentary Secretary for Education	Masagos Zulkifli	30 May 2006	31 October 2010
Ministry of the Environment and Water Resources
Office	Name	Term start	Term end
Minister for the Environment and Water Resources	**Yaacob Ibrahim (Note: Yaacob Ibrahim was concurrently the Minister-in-charge of Muslim Affairs.)**	30 May 2006	20 May 2011
Minister of State for the Environment	Amy Khor	1 November 2010	20 May 2011
Senior Parliamentary Secretary for the Environment	Amy Khor	30 May 2006	31 October 2010
Ministry of Finance
Office	Name	Term start	Term end
Minister for Finance	**Lee Hsien Loong**	30 May 2006	30 November 2007
Minister for Finance	**Tharman Shanmugaratnam**	1 December 2007	20 May 2011
Second Minister for Finance	**Tharman Shanmugaratnam**	30 May 2006	30 November 2007
Second Minister for Finance	**Lim Hwee Hua**	1 April 2009	20 May 2011
Senior Minister of State for Finance	Lim Hwee Hua	1 April 2008	31 March 2009
Minister of State for Finance	Lim Hwee Hua	30 May 2006	31 March 2008
Ministry of Foreign Affairs
Office	Name	Term start	Term end
Minister for Foreign Affairs	**George Yeo**	30 May 2006	20 May 2011
Second Minister for Foreign Affairs	**Raymond Lim**	30 May 2006	20 May 2011
Senior Minister of State for Foreign Affairs	Balaji Sadasivan	30 May 2006	27 September 2010
Senior Minister of State for Foreign Affairs	Zainul Abidin	30 May 2006	20 May 2011
Ministry of Health
Office	Name	Term start	Term end
Minister for Health	**Khaw Boon Wan**	30 May 2006	20 May 2011
Minister of State for Health	Heng Chee How	30 May 2006	31 March 2008
Senior Parliamentary Secretary for Health	Hawazi Daipi	1 April 2008	20 May 2011
Ministry of Home Affairs
Office	Name	Term start	Term end
Minister for Home Affairs	**Wong Kan Seng**	30 May 2006	31 October 2010
Minister for Home Affairs	**K. Shanmugam**	1 November 2010	20 May 2011
Second Minister for Home Affairs	**K. Shanmugam**	1 May 2008	31 October 2010
Senior Minister of State for Home Affairs	Ho Peng Kee	30 May 2006	20 May 2011
Minister of State for Home Affairs	Masagos Zulkifli	1 November 2010	20 May 2011
Senior Parliamentary Secretary for Education	Masagos Zulkifli	1 April 2008	31 October 2010
Minister for Information, Communications and the Arts
Office	Name	Term start	Term end
Minister for Information, Communications and the Arts	**Lee Boon Yang**	30 May 2006	31 March 2009
Minister for Information, Communications and the Arts	**Lui Tuck Yew** (Note: In an acting capacity until 31 October 2010.)	1 April 2009	20 May 2011
Second Minister for Information, Communications and the Arts	**Vivian Balakrishnan**	30 May 2006	31 March 2008
Senior Minister of State for Information, Communications and the Arts	Balaji Sadasivan	30 May 2006	31 March 2008
Senior Minister of State for Information, Communications and the Arts	Lui Tuck Yew	1 April 2008	31 October 2010
Senior Parliamentary Secretary for Information, Communications and the Arts	Sam Tan	1 November 2010	20 May 2011
Parliamentary Secretary for Information, Communications and the Arts	Sam Tan	1 July 2009	31 October 2010
Ministry of Law
Office	Name	Term start	Term end
Minister for Law	**S. Jayakumar**	30 May 2006	30 April 2008
Minister for Law	**K. Shanmugam**	1 May 2008	20 May 2011
Senior Minister of State for Law	Ho Peng Kee	30 May 2006	20 May 2011
Minister for Manpower
Office	Name	Term start	Term end
Minister for Manpower	**Ng Eng Hen**	30 May 2006	31 March 2008
Minister for Manpower	**Gan Kim Yong** (Note: In an acting capacity until 31 March 2009.)	1 April 2008	20 May 2011
Senior Minister of State for Manpower	Gan Kim Yong	1 April 2008	31 March 2009
Minister of State for Manpower	Gan Kim Yong	30 May 2006	31 March 2008
Minister of State for Manpower	Lee Yi Shyan	1 April 2009	20 May 2011
Senior Parliamentary Secretary for Manpower	Hawazi Daipi	30 May 2006	20 May 2011
Ministry of National Development
Office	Name	Term start	Term end
Minister for National Development	**Mah Bow Tan**	30 May 2006	20 May 2011
Minister of State for National Development	Grace Fu	1 August 2006	20 May 2011
Senior Parliamentary Secretary for National Development	Maliki Osman	1 November 2010	20 May 2011
Parliamentary Secretary for National Development	Maliki Osman	30 May 2006	31 October 2010
Ministry of Trade and Industry
Office	Name	Term start	Term end
Minister for Trade and Industry	**Lim Hng Kiang**	30 May 2006	20 May 2011
Senior Minister of State for Trade and Industry	S. Iswaran	1 April 2008	20 May 2011
Minister of State for Trade and Industry	S. Iswaran	1 July 2006	31 March 2008
Minister of State for Trade and Industry	Lee Yi Shyan	30 May 2006	20 May 2011
Senior Parliamentary Secretary for Trade and Industry	Sam Tan	1 November 2010	20 May 2011
Parliamentary Secretary for Trade and Industry	Sam Tan	1 July 2009	31 October 2010
Ministry of Transport
Office	Name	Term start	Term end
Minister for Transport	**Raymond Lim**	30 May 2006	20 May 2011
Second Minister for Transport	**Lim Hwee Hua**	1 April 2009	20 May 2011
Senior Minister of State for Transport	Lim Hwee Hua	1 April 2008	31 March 2009
Minister of State for Transport	Lim Hwee Hua	30 May 2006	31 March 2008
Senior Parliamentary Secretary for Transport	Teo Ser Luck	1 April 2008	20 May 2011
