= Third Goh Chok Tong Cabinet =

- 11th Cabinet of Singapore

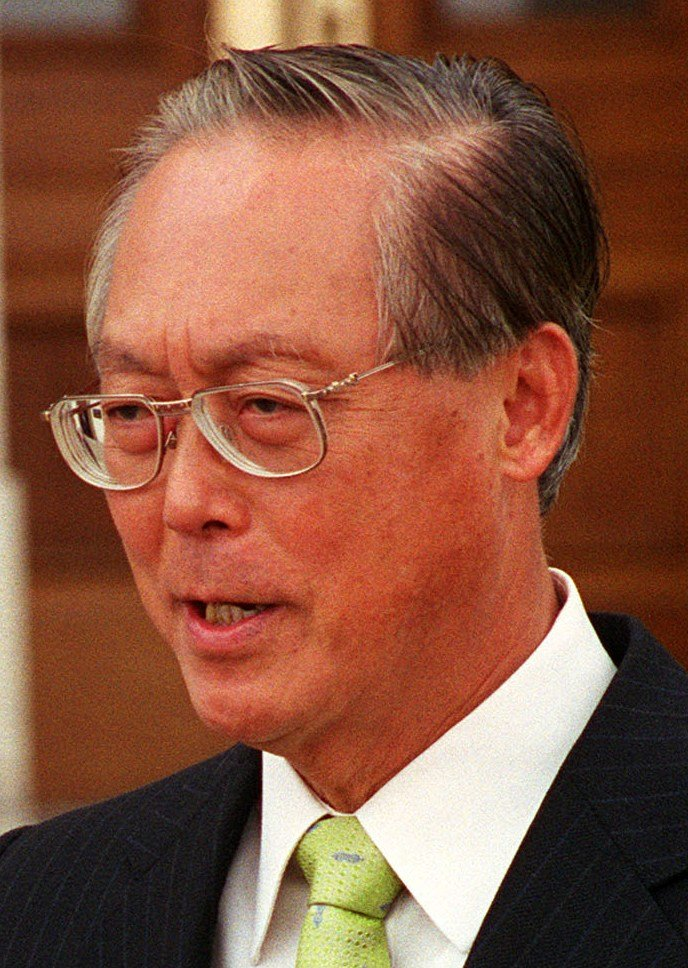
- Date formed: 25 January 1997
- Date dissolved: 22 November 2001

People and organisations
- Head of state: Ong Teng Cheong (until 1 September 1999); S. R. Nathan (from 1 September 1999)
- Head of government: Goh Chok Tong
- Deputy head of government: Lee Hsien Loong; Tony Tan
- Member party: People's Action Party
- Status in legislature: Supermajority
- Opposition party: Worker's Party; Singapore People's Party
- Opposition leader: Chiam See Tong

History
- Election: 1997
- Legislature term: 9th Parliament of Singapore
- Predecessor: Second Goh Chok Tong Cabinet
- Successor: Fourth Goh Chok Tong Cabinet

The Third Goh Chok Tong Cabinet is the Cabinet of Singapore formed by Prime Minister Goh Chok Tong following the 1997 general election which governed the country until prior to the 2001 general election.

== Cabinet ==
The Third Goh Chok Tong Cabinet is composed of the following members.

| Portfolio | Name | Term |
|---|---|---|
| Prime Minister | Goh Chok Tong | 28 November 1990 – 12 August 2004 |
| Senior Minister | Lee Kuan Yew | 28 November 1990 – 21 May 2011 |
| Deputy Prime Minister | Lee Hsien Loong | 28 November 1990 – 12 August 2004 |
| Deputy Prime Minister | Tony Tan | 1 August 1995 – 1 September 2005 |
| Minister without portfolio | Lim Boon Heng | 10 October 1993 – 22 November 2001 |
| Minister for Defence | Tony Tan | 1 August 1995 – 31 July 2003 |
| Second Minister for Defence | Teo Chee Hean | 15 January 1996 – 31 July 2003 |
| Minister for Law | S. Jayakumar | 13 September 1988 – 30 April 2008 |
| Minister for Foreign Affairs | S. Jayakumar | 2 January 1994 – 11 August 2004 |
| Second Minister for Foreign Affairs | Lim Hng Kiang | 17 April 1995 – 22 November 2001 |
| Minister for Finance | Richard Hu | 7 May 1985 – 9 November 2001 |
| Minister for Finance | Lee Hsien Loong | 10 November 2001 – 30 November 2007 |
| Second Minister for Finance | Lee Yock Suan | 25 January 1997 – 31 March 1998 |
| Second Minister for Finance | Lim Hng Kiang | 1 April 1998 – 11 August 2004 |
| Minister for Trade and Industry | Lee Yock Suan | 25 January 1997 – 2 June 1999 |
| Minister for Trade and Industry | George Yeo | 3 June 1999 – 11 August 2004 |
| Second Minister for Trade and Industry | George Yeo | 25 January 1997 – 2 June 1999 |
| Minister for Home Affairs | Wong Kan Seng | 2 January 1994 – 31 October 2010 |
| Minister for Health | Yeo Cheow Tong | 25 January 1997 – 2 June 1999 |
| Minister for Health | Lim Hng Kiang | 3 June 1999 – 31 July 2003 |
| Minister for the Environment | Yeo Cheow Tong | 25 January 1997 – 2 June 1999 |
| Minister for the Environment | Lee Yock Suan | 3 June 1999 – 30 September 2000 |
| Minister for the Environment | Lim Swee Say | 1 October 2000 – 22 November 2001 (acting) |
| Minister for Information and the Arts | George Yeo | 1 July 1991 – 2 June 1999 |
| Minister for Information and the Arts | Lee Yock Suan | 3 June 1999 – 22 November 2001 |
| Minister for Labour | Lee Boon Yang | 2 January 1992 – 31 March 1998 |
| Minister for Manpower | Lee Boon Yang | 1 April 1998 – 11 May 2003 |
| Minister for Communications | Mah Bow Tan | 7 September 1991 – 2 June 1999 |
| Minister for Communications and Information Technology | Yeo Cheow Tong | 3 June 1999 – 22 November 2001 |
| Minister for National Development | Lim Hng Kiang | 17 April 1995 – 2 June 1999 |
| Minister for National Development | Mah Bow Tan | 2 June 1999 – 20 May 2011 |
| Minister for Community Development | Abdullah Tarmugi | 15 January 1996 – 31 March 2000 |
| Minister for Community Development and Sports | Abdullah Tarmugi | 1 April 2000 – 24 March 2002 |
| Minister-in-charge of Muslim Affairs | Abdullah Tarmugi | 1 July 1993 – 24 March 2002 |
| Minister for Education | Teo Chee Hean | 25 January 1997 – 31 July 2003 |

== List of ministers ==
The following is the list of ministers in the Third Goh Chok Tong Cabinet. Cabinet members are listed in bold.

Prime Minister's Office
| Office | Name | Term start | Term end |
|---|---|---|---|
| Prime Minister | **Goh Chok Tong** | 25 January 1997 | 22 November 2001 |
| Senior Minister | **Lee Kuan Yew** | 25 January 1997 | 22 November 2001 |
| Deputy Prime Minister | **Lee Hsien Loong** | 25 January 1997 | 22 November 2001 |
| Deputy Prime Minister | **Tony Tan** | 25 January 1997 | 22 November 2001 |
| Minister without portfolio | **Lim Boon Heng** | 25 January 1997 | 22 November 2001 |
| Minister of State without portfolio | Matthias Yao | 3 June 1999 | 22 November 2001 |
| Senior Parliamentary Secretary for the Prime Minister's Office | Chan Soo Sen | 1 May 2001 | 22 November 2001 |
| Parliamentary Secretary for the Prime Minister's Office | Chan Soo Sen | 25 January 1997 | 30 April 2001 |
Ministry of Communications (until 2 June 1999)
| Office | Name | Term start | Term end |
| Minister for Communications | **Mah Bow Tan** | 25 January 1997 | 2 June 1999 |
| Minister of State for Communications | John Chen | 1 March 1997 | 2 June 1999 |
| Parliamentary Secretary for Communications | Yaacob Ibrahim | 1 July 1998 | 2 June 1999 |
Ministry for Communications and Information Technology (from 3 June 1999)
| Office | Name | Term start | Term end |
| Minister for Communications and Information Technology | **Yeo Cheow Tong** | 3 June 1999 | 22 November 2001 |
| Minister of State for Communications and Information Technology | John Chen | 3 June 1999 | 22 November 2001 |
| Minister of State for Communications and Information Technology | Lim Swee Say | 3 June 1999 | 22 November 2001 |
| Senior Parliamentary Secretary for Communications and Information Technology | Yaacob Ibrahim | 1 May 2001 | 22 November 2001 |
| Parliamentary Secretary for Communications and Information Technology | Yaacob Ibrahim | 3 June 1999 | 30 April 2001 |
Ministry of Community Development (until 31 March 2000)
| Office | Name | Term start | Term end |
| Minister for Community Development | **Abdullah Tarmugi** | 25 January 1997 | 31 March 2000 |
| Senior Parliamentary Secretary for Community Development | Yu-Foo Yee Shoon | 3 June 1999 | 31 March 2000 |
| Parliamentary Secretary for Community Development | Chan Soo Sen | 25 January 1997 | 2 June 1999 |
Minister for Community Development and Sports (from 1 April 2000)
| Office | Name | Term start | Term end |
| Minister for Community Development and Sports | **Abdullah Tarmugi** | 1 April 2000 | 22 November 2001 |
| Senior Parliamentary Secretary for Community Development and Sports | Yu-Foo Yee Shoon | 1 April 2000 | 22 November 2001 |
Ministry of Defence
| Office | Name | Term start | Term end |
| Minister for Defence | **Tony Tan** | 25 January 1997 | 22 November 2001 |
| Second Minister for Defence | **Teo Chee Hean** | 25 January 1997 | 22 November 2001 |
| Minister of State for Defence | Matthias Yao | 25 January 1997 | 2 June 1999 |
| Minister of State for Defence | David Lim | 15 June 1998 | 22 November 2001 |
Ministry of Education
| Office | Name | Term start | Term end |
| Minister for Education | **Teo Chee Hean** | 25 January 1997 | 22 November 2001 |
| Senior Minister of State for Education | Aline Wong | 25 January 1997 | 22 November 2001 |
| Senior Minister of State for Education | Peter Chen | 25 January 1997 | 22 November 2001 |
| Senior Parliamentary Secretary for Education | Mohamad Maidin Packer | 1 May 2001 | 22 November 2001 |
| Parliamentary Secretary for Education | Mohamad Maidin Packer | 25 January 1997 | 30 April 2001 |
Ministry of the Environment
| Office | Name | Term start | Term end |
| Minister for the Environment | **Yeo Cheow Tong** | 25 January 1997 | 2 June 1999 |
| Minister for the Environment | **Lee Yock Suan** | 3 June 1999 | 30 September 2000 |
| Minister for the Environment | **Lim Swee Say** (Note: In an acting capacity.) | 1 October 2000 | 22 November 2001 |
| Senior Minister of State for the Environment | Sidek Saniff | 25 January 1997 | 22 November 2001 |
Ministry of Finance
| Office | Name | Term start | Term end |
| Minister for Finance | **Richard Hu** | 25 January 1997 | 9 November 2001 |
| Minister for Finance | **Lee Hsien Loong** | 10 November 2001 | 22 November 2001 |
| Second Minister for Finance | Lee Yock Suan | 25 January 1997 | 31 March 1998 |
| Second Minister for Finance | Lim Hng Kiang | 1 April 1998 | 22 November 2001 |
Ministry of Foreign Affairs
| Office | Name | Term start | Term end |
| Minister for Foreign Affairs | **S. Jayakumar** | 25 January 1997 | 22 November 2001 |
| Second Minister for Foreign Affairs | **Lim Hng Kiang** | 25 January 1997 | 22 November 2001 |
| Minister of State for Foreign Affairs | Ow Chin Hock | 1 March 1997 | 22 November 2001 |
| Senior Parliamentary Secretary for Foreign Affairs | Zainul Abidin | 1 July 1998 | 22 November 2001 |
Ministry of Health
| Office | Name | Term start | Term end |
| Minister for Health | **Yeo Cheow Tong** | 25 January 1997 | 2 June 1999 |
| Minister for Health | **Lim Hng Kiang** | 3 June 1999 | 22 November 2001 |
| Senior Minister of State for Health | Aline Wong | 25 January 1997 | 2 June 1999 |
| Senior Parliamentary Secretary for Health | Chan Soo Sen | 1 May 2001 | 22 November 2001 |
| Parliamentary Secretary for Health | Chan Soo Sen | 3 June 1999 | 30 April 2001 |
Ministry of Home Affairs
| Office | Name | Term start | Term end |
| Minister for Home Affairs | **Wong Kan Seng** | 25 January 1997 | 22 November 2001 |
| Minister of State for Home Affairs | Ho Peng Kee | 25 January 1997 | 22 November 2001 |
Ministry for Information and the Arts
| Office | Name | Term start | Term end |
| Minister for Information and the Arts | **George Yeo** | 25 January 1997 | 2 June 1999 |
| Minister for Information and the Arts | **Lee Yock Suan** | 3 June 1999 | 22 November 2001 |
| Minister of State for Information and the Arts | David Lim | 3 June 1999 | 22 November 2001 |
| Senior Parliamentary Secretary for Information and the Arts | Yatiman Yusof | 25 January 1997 | 22 November 2001 |
Ministry of Labour (until 31 March 1998)
| Office | Name | Term start | Term end |
| Minister for Labour | **Lee Boon Yang** | 25 January 1997 | 31 March 1998 |
| Minister of State for Labour | Othman Haron Eusofe | 25 January 1997 | 31 March 1998 |
Ministry of Law
| Office | Name | Term start | Term end |
| Minister for Law | **S. Jayakumar** | 25 January 1997 | 22 November 2001 |
| Minister of State for Law | Ho Peng Kee | 25 January 1997 | 22 November 2001 |
Minister for Manpower (from 1 April 1998)
| Office | Name | Term start | Term end |
| Minister for Manpower | **Lee Boon Yang** | 1 April 1998 | 22 November 2001 |
| Minister of State for Labour | Othman Haron Eusofe | 1 April 1998 | 22 November 2001 |
Ministry of National Development
| Office | Name | Term start | Term end |
| Minister for National Development | **Lim Hng Kiang** | 25 January 1997 | 2 June 1999 |
| Minister for National Development | **Mah Bow Tan** | 3 June 1999 | 22 November 2001 |
| Minister of State for National Development | John Chen | 3 June 1999 | 22 November 2001 |
| Senior Parliamentary Secretary for National Development | Koo Tsai Kee | 3 June 1999 | 22 November 2001 |
| Parliamentary Secretary for National Development | Koo Tsai Kee | 25 January 1997 | 2 June 1999 |
Ministry of Trade and Industry
| Office | Name | Term start | Term end |
| Minister for Trade and Industry | **Lee Yock Suan** | 25 January 1997 | 2 June 1999 |
| Minister for Trade and Industry | **George Yeo** | 3 June 1999 | 22 November 2001 |
| Second Minister for Trade and Industry | **George Yeo** | 25 January 1997 | 2 June 1999 |
| Senior Minister of State for Trade and Industry | Peter Chen | 1 October 2000 | 22 November 2001 |
| Minister of State for Trade and Industry | Lim Swee Say | 3 June 1999 | 30 September 2001 |
| Senior Parliamentary Secretary for Trade and Industry | Tang Guan Seng | 25 January 1997 | 30 September 2001 |
