= Fourth Goh Chok Tong Cabinet =

- 12th Cabinet of Singapore

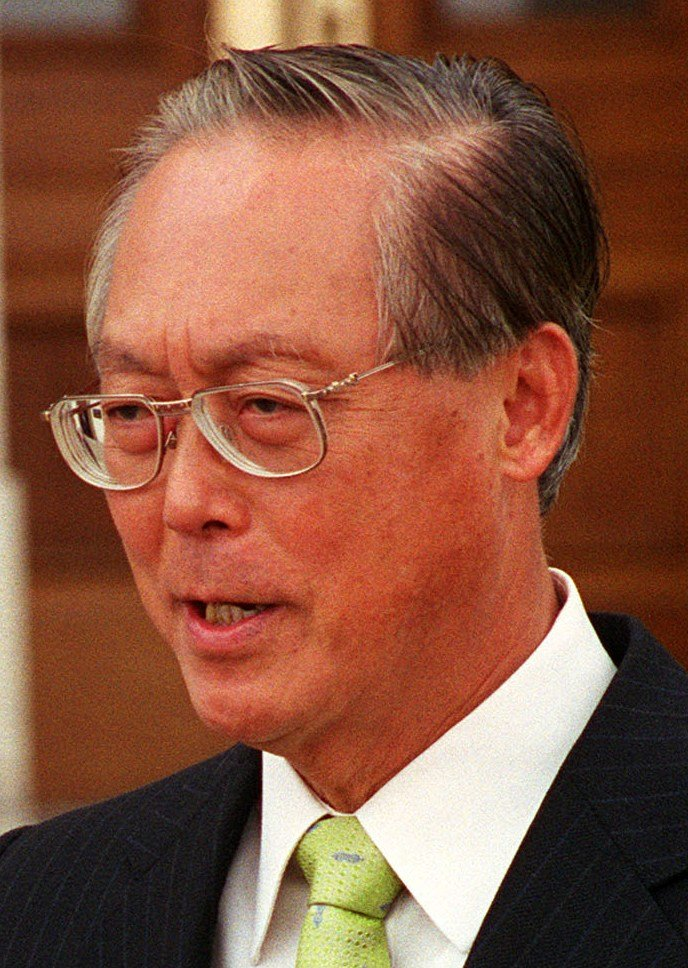
- Date formed: 23 November 2001
- Date dissolved: 11 August 2004

People and organisations
- Head of state: S. R. Nathan
- Head of government: Goh Chok Tong
- Deputy head of government: Lee Hsien Loong; Tony Tan
- Member party: People's Action Party
- Status in legislature: Supermajority
- Opposition party: Singapore Democratic Alliance; Worker's Party
- Opposition leader: Chiam See Tong

History
- Election: 2001
- Legislature term: 10th Parliament of Singapore
- Predecessor: Third Goh Chok Tong Cabinet
- Successor: First Lee Hsien Loong Cabinet

The Fourth Goh Chok Tong Cabinet is the Cabinet of Singapore formed by Prime Minister Goh Chok Tong following the 2001 general election which governed the country until Goh was succeeded as prime minister by Lee Hsien Loong in 2004.

== Cabinet ==
The Fourth Goh Chok Tong Cabinet is composed of the following members.

Portfolio	Name	Term
Prime Minister	Goh Chok Tong	28 November 1990 – 12 August 2004
Senior Minister	Lee Kuan Yew	28 November 1990 – 21 May 2011
Deputy Prime Minister	Lee Hsien Loong	28 November 1990 – 12 August 2004
Deputy Prime Minister	Tony Tan	1 August 1995 – 1 September 2005
Coordinating Minister for Security and Defence	Tony Tan	1 August 2003 – 1 September 2005
Minister in the Prime Minister's Office	Lee Yock Suan	23 November 2001 – 11 August 2004
Minister in the Prime Minister's Office	Lim Boon Heng	23 November 2001 – 20 May 2011
Minister in the Prime Minister's Office	Lim Hng Kiang	1 August 2003 – 11 August 2004
Minister for Finance	Lee Hsien Loong	10 November 2001 – 30 November 2007
Second Minister for Finance	Lim Hng Kiang	1 April 1998 – 11 August 2004
Minister for Defence	Tony Tan	1 August 1995 – 31 July 2003
Minister for Defence	Teo Chee Hean	1 August 2003 – 20 May 2011
Second Minister for Defence	Teo Chee Hean	15 January 1996 – 31 July 2003
Minister for Law	S. Jayakumar	13 September 1988 – 30 April 2008
Minister for Foreign Affairs	S. Jayakumar	2 January 1994 – 11 August 2004
Second Minister for Foreign Affairs	Lee Yock Suan	23 November 2001 – 11 August 2004
Minister for Home Affairs	Wong Kan Seng	2 January 1994 – 31 October 2010
Minister for Transport	Yeo Cheow Tong	23 November 2001 – 29 May 2006
Minister for Trade and Industry	George Yeo	3 June 1999 – 11 August 2004
Minister for Manpower	Lee Boon Yang	1 April 1998 – 11 May 2003
Minister for Manpower	Ng Eng Hen	12 May 2003 – 11 August 2004 (acting)
Minister for National Development	Mah Bow Tan	2 June 1999 – 20 May 2011
Minister for Health	Lim Hng Kiang	3 June 1999 – 31 July 2003
Minister for Health	Khaw Boon Wan	1 August 2003 – 11 August 2004 (acting)
Minister for Community Development and Sports	Abdullah Tarmugi	1 April 2000 – 24 March 2002
Minister for Community Development and Sports	Yaacob Ibrahim	25 March 2002 – 11 May 2003 (acting), 12 May 2003 – 11 August 2004
Minister-in-charge of Muslim Affairs	Abdullah Tarmugi	1 July 1993 – 24 March 2002
Minister-in-charge of Muslim Affairs	Yaacob Ibrahim	25 March 2002 – 30 April 2018
Minister for Education	Teo Chee Hean	25 January 1997 – 31 July 2003
Minister for Education	Tharman Shanmugaratnam	1 August 2003 – 11 August 2004 (acting)
Minister for the Environment	Lim Swee Say	23 November 2001 – 11 August 2004
Minister for Information, Communications and the Arts	David Lim	23 November 2001 – 11 May 2003 (acting)
Minister for Information, Communications and the Arts	Lee Boon Yang	12 May 2003 – 31 March 2009

== List of office holders ==
The following is the list of office holders in the Fourth Goh Chok Tong Cabinet. Cabinet members are listed in bold.

Prime Minister's Office
Office	Name	Term start	Term end
Prime Minister	**Goh Chok Tong**	23 November 2001	11 August 2004
Senior Minister	**Lee Kuan Yew**	23 November 2001	11 August 2004
Deputy Prime Minister	**Lee Hsien Loong**	23 November 2001	11 August 2004
Deputy Prime Minister	**Tony Tan**	23 November 2001	11 August 2004
Coordinating Minister for Security and Defence	**Tony Tan**	1 August 2003	11 August 2004
Minister in the Prime Minister's Office	**Lee Yock Suan**	23 November 2001	11 August 2004
Minister in the Prime Minister's Office	**Lim Boon Heng**	23 November 2001	11 August 2004
Minister in the Prime Minister's Office	**Lim Hng Kiang**	1 August 2003	11 August 2004
Senior Minister of State for the Prime Minister's Office	Matthias Yao	23 November 2001	11 August 2004
Minister of State for the Prime Minister's Office	Chan Soo Sen	23 November 2001	31 July 2003
Minister for Community Development and Sports
Office	Name	Term start	Term end
Minister for Community Development and Sports	**Abdullah Tarmugi**	23 November 2001	24 March 2002
Minister for Community Development and Sports	**Yaacob Ibrahim** (Note: In an acting capacity until 11 May 2003.)	25 March 2002	11 August 2004
Minister of State for Community Development and Sports	Chan Soo Sen	23 November 2001	11 August 2004
Minister of State for Community Development and Sports	Yaacob Ibrahim	23 November 2001	24 March 2002
Ministry of Defence
Office	Name	Term start	Term end
Minister for Defence	**Tony Tan**	23 November 2001	31 July 2003
Minister for Defence	**Teo Chee Hean**	1 August 2003	11 August 2004
Second Minister for Defence	**Teo Chee Hean**	23 November 2001	31 July 2003
Senior Minister of State for Defence	David Lim	23 November 2001	30 April 2002
Minister of State for Defence	Cedric Foo	1 April 2002	11 August 2004
Senior Parliamentary Secretary for Defence	Koo Tsai Kee	23 November 2001	11 August 2004
Ministry of Education
Office	Name	Term start	Term end
Minister for Education	**Teo Chee Hean**	23 November 2001	31 July 2003
Minister for Education	**Tharman Shanmugaratnam** (Note: In an acting capacity.)	1 August 2003	11 August 2004
Senior Minister of State for Education	Tharman Shanmugaratnam	23 November 2001	31 July 2003
Minister of State for Education	Ng Eng Hen	1 January 2002	11 August 2004
Minister of State for Education	Chan Soo Sen	1 August 2003	11 August 2004
Parliamentary Secretary for Education	Hawazi Daipi	23 November 2001	11 August 2004
Ministry of the Environment
Office	Name	Term start	Term end
Minister for the Environment	**Lim Swee Say**	23 November 2001	11 August 2004
Minister of State for the Environment	Balaji Sadasivan	23 November 2001	11 May 2003
Senior Parliamentary Secretary for the Environment	Mohamad Maidin Packer	12 May 2003	11 August 2004
Ministry of Finance
Office	Name	Term start	Term end
Minister for Finance	**Lee Hsien Loong**	23 November 2001	11 August 2004
Second Minister for Finance	**Lim Hng Kiang**	23 November 2001	11 August 2004
Senior Minister of State for Finance	Khaw Boon Wan	1 August 2003	11 August 2004
Ministry of Foreign Affairs
Office	Name	Term start	Term end
Minister for Foreign Affairs	**S. Jayakumar**	23 November 2001	11 August 2004
Second Minister for Foreign Affairs	**Lee Yock Suan**	23 November 2001	11 August 2004
Minister of State for Foreign Affairs	Raymond Lim	1 December 2001	11 August 2004
Ministry of Health
Office	Name	Term start	Term end
Minister for Health	**Lim Hng Kiang**	23 November 2001	31 July 2003
Minister for Health	**Khaw Boon Wan**	1 August 2003	11 August 2004
Minister of State for Health	Balaji Sadasivan	23 November 2001	11 August 2004
Ministry of Home Affairs
Office	Name	Term start	Term end
Minister for Home Affairs	**Wong Kan Seng**	23 November 2001	11 August 2004
Senior Minister of State for Home Affairs	Ho Peng Kee	23 November 2001	11 August 2004
Senior Parliamentary Secretary for Home Affairs	Mohamad Maidin Packer	23 November 2001	11 August 2004
Minister for Information, Communications and the Arts
Office	Name	Term start	Term end
Minister for Information, Communications and the Arts	**David Lim**	23 November 2001	11 May 2003
Minister for Information, Communications and the Arts	**Lee Boon Yang**	12 May 2003	11 August 2004
Senior Minister of State for Information, Communications and the Arts	Khaw Boon Wan	23 November 2001	31 July 2003
Senior Parliamentary Secretary for Information, Communications and the Arts	Yatiman Yusof	23 November 2001	11 August 2004
Ministry of Law
Office	Name	Term start	Term end
Minister for Law	**S. Jayakumar**	23 November 2001	11 August 2004
Senior Minister of State for Law	Ho Peng Kee	23 November 2001	11 August 2004
Minister for Manpower
Office	Name	Term start	Term end
Minister for Manpower	**Lee Boon Yang**	23 November 2001	11 May 2003
Minister for Manpower	**Ng Eng Hen**	12 May 2003	11 August 2004
Minister of State for Manpower	Ng Eng Hen	1 January 2002	11 May 2003
Parliamentary Secretary for Manpower	Hawazi Daipi	12 May 2003	11 August 2004
Ministry of National Development
Office	Name	Term start	Term end
Minister for National Development	**Mah Bow Tan**	23 November 2001	11 August 2004
Minister of State for National Development	Vivian Balakrishnan	1 January 2002	11 August 2004
Senior Parliamentary Secretary for National Development	Koo Tsai Kee	23 November 2001	22 November 2001
Ministry of Trade and Industry
Office	Name	Term start	Term end
Minister for Trade and Industry	**George Yeo**	23 November 2001	11 August 2004
Senior Minister of State for Trade and Industry	Tharman Shanmugaratnam	23 November 2001	11 August 2004
Minister of State for Trade and Industry	Raymond Lim	1 December 2001	11 August 2004
Minister of State for Trade and Industry	Vivian Balakrishnan	1 August 2003	11 August 2004
Ministry of Transport
Office	Name	Term start	Term end
Minister for Transport	**Yeo Cheow Tong**	23 November 2001	11 August 2004
Senior Minister of State for Transport	Khaw Boon Wan	23 November 2001	31 July 2003
Minister of State for Transport	Balaji Sadasivan	12 May 2003	11 August 2004
