= REACH (Singapore) =

REACH (Reaching Everyone for Active Citizenry@Home)

Agency overview
- Formed: 12 October 2006; 19 years ago
- Preceding agency: Feedback Unit (FBU) (formed on 15 April 1985; 41 years ago)
- Jurisdiction: Government of Singapore
- Headquarters: 140 Hill Street, Old Hill Street Police Station, Singapore 179369
- Ministers responsible: Josephine Teo, Minister for Digital Development and Information; Tan Kiat How, Senior Minister of State for Digital Development and Information; Janil Puthucheary, Senior Minister of State for Digital Development and Information
- Agency executives: Tan Kiat How, Chairman; Eric Chua, Deputy Chairman; Rahayu Mahzam, Deputy Chairman; Patrick Tay, Deputy Chairman
- Parent agency: Ministry of Digital Development and Information
- Website: www.reach.gov.sg

REACH (Reaching Everyone for Active Citizenry@Home, Chinese: 民情联系组) is a department under the Ministry of Digital Development and Information (MDDI). It is involved in connecting with citizens and gathering feedback on major issues.

It was a division under the Ministry of Community Development, Youth & Sports (MCYS), which was restructured on 1 November 2012. REACH was assimilated into then MCI.

== History ==
REACH was launched on 12 October 2006 when the Feedback Unit was restructured to move beyond gathering public feedback, to become the lead agency for engaging and connecting with citizens. REACH was also appointed as the Singapore government's e-engagement platform in January 2009.
