= Prime Minister of Singapore =

Head of the government

Prime Minister of the Republic of Singapore
- Coat of arms of Singapore

- Flag of Singapore

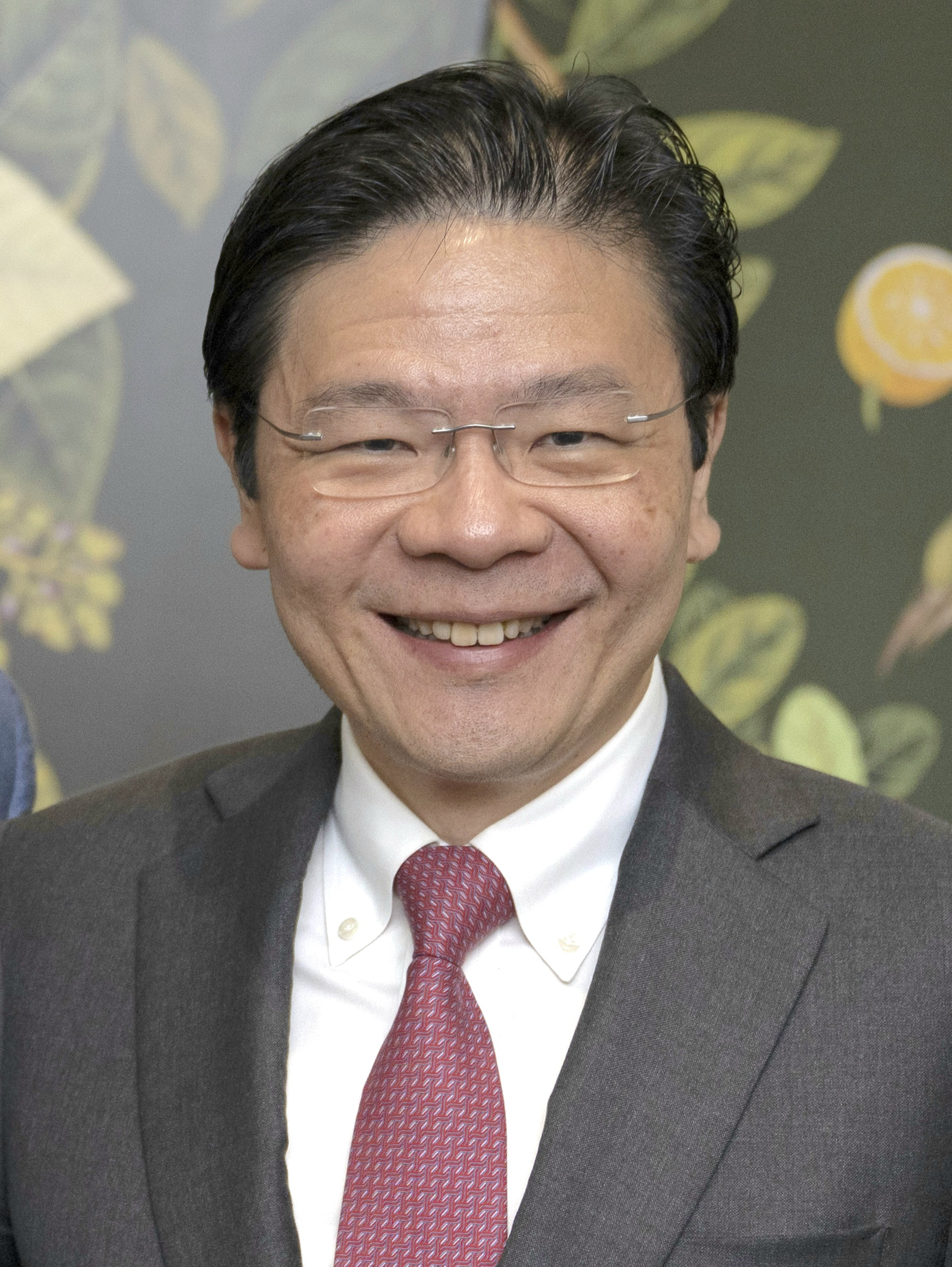
- Incumbent; Lawrence Wong since 15 May 2024
- Government of Singapore; Prime Minister's Office
- Style: Prime Minister (informal); The Honourable (formal); His Excellency (diplomatic)
- Type: Head of government
- Abbreviation: PM
- Residence: Sri Temasek
- Appointer: President
- Term length: At the pleasure of the president, based on the officeholder ability to command a parliamentary majority
- Precursor: Chief Minister of Singapore
- Inaugural holder: Lee Kuan Yew
- Formation: 3 June 1959; 67 years ago
- Deputy: Deputy Prime Minister
- Salary: S$3,600,000/US$2,846,000 annually (including S$259,900 MP salary) (Note: The increment from S$2.2 million to S$3.6 million will take effect fom 15 October 2026.)
- Website: www.pmo.gov.sg

The prime minister of Singapore (Note: Malay: Perdana Menteri Republik Singapura, Chinese: 新加坡共和國總理; pinyin: Xīnjiāpō Gònghéguó Zǒnglǐ, Tamil: சிங்கப்பூர் குடியரசின் பிரதமர், romanized: Ciṅkappūr Kuṭiyaraciṉ Piratamar) is the head of government of Singapore. The president appoints the prime minister on the advice and consent of the Cabinet of Singapore. The incumbent prime minister is Lawrence Wong, an MP for Marsiling–Yew Tee Group Representation Constituency from the governing People's Action Party, who took office on 15 May 2024.

Singapore is modelled after the Westminster system. The prime minister only governs with the confidence of the majority in Parliament; as such, the prime minister typically sits as a member of Parliament (MP) and leads the largest party or a coalition of parties. In practice, the prime minister is the leader of the majority party in Parliament.

== History ==
The office of prime minister succeeded the office of chief minister in 1959 after Singapore had attained self-governance from the United Kingdom, as the State of Singapore, with Lee Kuan Yew being sworn in as the first prime minister on 5 June 1959.

Concerning Singapore's autonomous status in the Malaysia Agreement, the title of prime minister remained unchanged after Singapore's merger with Malaya, Sarawak and North Borneo to form Malaysia in 1963, despite the existence of the prime minister of Malaysia for the entire federation of which Singapore was briefly a part.

Following the independence of Singapore in 1965, the office of Prime Minister was retained, with the president of Singapore becoming a ceremonial head of state. In 1991, amendments to the Constitution of Singapore vested executive powers in the presidency, along with discretionary veto powers over the government. The Constitution also vests "general direction and control of the government" in the Cabinet, with the president almost always bound to act on the advice of the Cabinet or any minister acting under the Cabinet authority. Thus, in practice, most of the actual work of governing is done by the prime minister and Cabinet.

Under Article 26(4)(a) of the Constitution of Singapore, the prime minister may appoint a Cabinet minister, subject to presidential approval, as acting prime minister if the prime minister is on medical leave, away from Singapore or is granted a leave of absence under Article 32 of the Constitution. The deputy prime minister or senior minister will usually become the acting prime minister. Still, any Cabinet minister may be appointed to the role.

== Authority ==
Under the Constitution, executive power is nominally vested in the president. However, the president can only exercise that authority on the advice of the Cabinet or a minister acting under general Cabinet authority. Hence, in practice, the prime minister, as the Cabinet's leader, does most of the actual work of governing.

The prime minister is responsible for overseeing the government's day-to-day affairs and executing government policy. As leader of the majority party in Parliament, the prime minister is also responsible for passing legislation through Parliament.

The prime minister also nominates the speaker of Parliament and leader of the house, who are responsible for arranging government business and organising legislative programmes, usually under the directive of the prime minister and the Cabinet.

The prime minister chooses the other members of the Cabinet by advising the president; the president must exercise their powers in accordance with the advice of the prime minister. The prime minister may change, retain, or revoke any sitting minister's appointment under their prerogative. The prime minister also advises the president on appointments, such as Attorney-General, and Permanent Secretary of a ministry.

The prime minister can advise the president to make a Proclamation of Emergency; the president issues the Proclamation if satisfied.

The prime minister can declare a defence or security measure, and has executive authority over the Singapore Armed Forces (SAF) through the Armed Forces Council, which consists of Minister for Defence, Permanent Secretaries of the Ministry of Defence (MINDEF), Chief of Defence Force, Chief of Army, Chief of Air Force and Chief of Navy; all of whom are appointed by the president under the prime minister's advice.

== Privileges ==
Sri Temasek is the prime minister's official residence, though none of the prime ministers have ever lived there. The Istana is the working office of the prime minister. Since 2024 however, Sri Temasek has been the working office of the Prime Minister due to the ongoing renovations at The Istana, as confirmed by Lawrence Wong in his National Day Address. The prime minister is protected by the Specialised Security Command of the Singapore Police Force (SPF), who also ensure the protection of the president, cabinet ministers and visiting foreign dignitaries.

The annual salary package the prime minister would receive, including the 13th-month bonus, Annual Variable Component, and National Bonus, which is twice the MR4 benchmark, stands at S$2.2 million. As there is no one to decide on the annual performance bonus for the prime minister, the prime minister's bonus will be based only on the National Bonus. The prime minister is also on the Medisave-cum-Subsidised Outpatient (MSO) scheme—where an additional 2% of their gross monthly salary will be credited into their Medisave account.

The prime minister's annual salary was S$3.07 million before a salary review in 2011. On 21 May 2011, a committee was set by Prime Minister Lee Hsien Loong, to review the salaries of the prime minister as well as the president, ministers, members of Parliament and other political officeholders. After the recommended wage reductions by the committee were accepted in Parliament, the prime minister's salary was reduced by 36%—including the removal of his pension to S$2.2 million or approximately US$1.7 million at that time. A further revision of the salary on 8 September 2026 further increased their annual salary to S$3.6 million (approximately US$2.8 million), which becomes effective starting 15 October. Nonetheless, the Prime Minister's salary remains the highest for a politician worldwide to date.

Unlike many heads of government, Singapore's prime minister does not have a dedicated government aircraft and instead travels on commercial flights. When representing the government abroad, they typically fly with Singapore Airlines or, for less prominent destinations, with its budget subsidiary Scoot.

== List of prime ministers of Singapore ==
Political parties

People's Action Party (PAP)

No.	Portrait	Name Constituency (Birth–Death)	Term of office			Election	Political party	Cabinet	Head of state (Note: The following served as head of state of Singapore: Monarch of the United Kingdom (until 1963); King of Malaysia (1963–1965); President of Singapore (from 1965)) (Tenure)
No.	Portrait	Name Constituency (Birth–Death)	Took office	Left office	Time in office	Election	Political party	Cabinet	Head of state (Tenure)
1		Lee Kuan Yew; MP for Tanjong Pagar SMC (1923–2015)	5 June 1959	28 November 1990	31 years, 176 days	1959	PAP	Lee K. I	Elizabeth II (1959–1963)
1		Lee Kuan Yew; MP for Tanjong Pagar SMC (1923–2015)	5 June 1959	28 November 1990	31 years, 176 days	1959	PAP	Lee K. I	Putra of Perlis (1963–1965)
1		Lee Kuan Yew; MP for Tanjong Pagar SMC (1923–2015)	5 June 1959	28 November 1990	31 years, 176 days	1963	PAP	Lee K. II	Putra of Perlis (1963–1965)
1		Lee Kuan Yew; MP for Tanjong Pagar SMC (1923–2015)	5 June 1959	28 November 1990	31 years, 176 days	1963	PAP	Lee K. II	Yusof Ishak (1965–1970)
1		Lee Kuan Yew; MP for Tanjong Pagar SMC (1923–2015)	5 June 1959	28 November 1990	31 years, 176 days	1968	PAP	Lee K. III	Yusof Ishak (1965–1970)
1		Lee Kuan Yew; MP for Tanjong Pagar SMC (1923–2015)	5 June 1959	28 November 1990	31 years, 176 days	1968	PAP	Lee K. III	Benjamin Sheares (1971–1981)
1		Lee Kuan Yew; MP for Tanjong Pagar SMC (1923–2015)	5 June 1959	28 November 1990	31 years, 176 days	1972	PAP	Lee K. IV	Benjamin Sheares (1971–1981)
1		Lee Kuan Yew; MP for Tanjong Pagar SMC (1923–2015)	5 June 1959	28 November 1990	31 years, 176 days	1976	PAP	Lee K. V	Benjamin Sheares (1971–1981)
1		Lee Kuan Yew; MP for Tanjong Pagar SMC (1923–2015)	5 June 1959	28 November 1990	31 years, 176 days	1980	PAP	Lee K. VI	Benjamin Sheares (1971–1981)
1		Lee Kuan Yew; MP for Tanjong Pagar SMC (1923–2015)	5 June 1959	28 November 1990	31 years, 176 days	1980	PAP	Lee K. VI	Devan Nair (1981–1985)
1		Lee Kuan Yew; MP for Tanjong Pagar SMC (1923–2015)	5 June 1959	28 November 1990	31 years, 176 days	1984	PAP	Lee K. VII	Devan Nair (1981–1985)
1		Lee Kuan Yew; MP for Tanjong Pagar SMC (1923–2015)	5 June 1959	28 November 1990	31 years, 176 days	1984	PAP	Lee K. VII	Wee Kim Wee (1985–1993)
1		Lee Kuan Yew; MP for Tanjong Pagar SMC (1923–2015)	5 June 1959	28 November 1990	31 years, 176 days	1988	PAP	Lee K. VIII	Wee Kim Wee (1985–1993)
2		Goh Chok Tong; MP for Marine Parade GRC (born 1941)	28 November 1990	12 August 2004	13 years, 258 days	—	PAP	Goh I	Wee Kim Wee (1985–1993)
2		Goh Chok Tong; MP for Marine Parade GRC (born 1941)	28 November 1990	12 August 2004	13 years, 258 days	1991	PAP	Goh II	Wee Kim Wee (1985–1993)
2		Goh Chok Tong; MP for Marine Parade GRC (born 1941)	28 November 1990	12 August 2004	13 years, 258 days	1991	PAP	Goh II	Ong Teng Cheong (1993–1999)
2		Goh Chok Tong; MP for Marine Parade GRC (born 1941)	28 November 1990	12 August 2004	13 years, 258 days	1997	PAP	Goh III	Ong Teng Cheong (1993–1999)
2		Goh Chok Tong; MP for Marine Parade GRC (born 1941)	28 November 1990	12 August 2004	13 years, 258 days	1997	PAP	Goh III	S. R. Nathan (1999–2011)
2		Goh Chok Tong; MP for Marine Parade GRC (born 1941)	28 November 1990	12 August 2004	13 years, 258 days	2001	PAP	Goh IV	S. R. Nathan (1999–2011)
3		Lee Hsien Loong; MP for Ang Mo Kio GRC (born 1952)	12 August 2004	15 May 2024	19 years, 277 days	—	PAP	Lee H. I	S. R. Nathan (1999–2011)
3		Lee Hsien Loong; MP for Ang Mo Kio GRC (born 1952)	12 August 2004	15 May 2024	19 years, 277 days	2006	PAP	Lee H. II	S. R. Nathan (1999–2011)
3		Lee Hsien Loong; MP for Ang Mo Kio GRC (born 1952)	12 August 2004	15 May 2024	19 years, 277 days	2011	PAP	Lee H. III	S. R. Nathan (1999–2011)
3		Lee Hsien Loong; MP for Ang Mo Kio GRC (born 1952)	12 August 2004	15 May 2024	19 years, 277 days	2011	PAP	Lee H. III	Tony Tan (2011–2017)
3		Lee Hsien Loong; MP for Ang Mo Kio GRC (born 1952)	12 August 2004	15 May 2024	19 years, 277 days	2015	PAP	Lee H. IV	Tony Tan (2011–2017)
3		Lee Hsien Loong; MP for Ang Mo Kio GRC (born 1952)	12 August 2004	15 May 2024	19 years, 277 days	2015	PAP	Lee H. IV	Halimah Yacob (2017–2023)
3		Lee Hsien Loong; MP for Ang Mo Kio GRC (born 1952)	12 August 2004	15 May 2024	19 years, 277 days	2020	PAP	Lee H. V	Halimah Yacob (2017–2023)
3		Lee Hsien Loong; MP for Ang Mo Kio GRC (born 1952)	12 August 2004	15 May 2024	19 years, 277 days	2020	PAP	Lee H. V	Tharman Shanmugaratnam (2023–present)
4		Lawrence Wong; MP for Marsiling–Yew Tee GRC (born 1972)	15 May 2024	Incumbent	2 years, 187 days	—	PAP	Wong I	Tharman Shanmugaratnam (2023–present)
4		Lawrence Wong; MP for Marsiling–Yew Tee GRC (born 1972)	15 May 2024	Incumbent	2 years, 187 days	2025	PAP	Wong II	Tharman Shanmugaratnam (2023–present)

== See also ==
- Prime Minister's Office (PMO)
- Deputy Prime Minister
- Cabinet of Singapore
- Leader of the Opposition
- Politics of Singapore
