= Ministry of Digital Development and Information =

Singaporean government ministry

Coordinates: 1°17′26.61″N 103°50′53.31″E

Agency overview
- Formed: 8 July 2024; 2 years ago
- Preceding agencies: Ministry of Information, Communications and the Arts (MICA); Ministry of Communications and Information (MCI)
- Jurisdiction: Government of Singapore
- Headquarters: 140 Hill Street #01-01A, Old Hill Street Police Station, Singapore 179369
- Employees: 2,651 (2018)
- Annual budget: S$1.04 billion (2019)
- Ministers responsible: Josephine Teo, Minister, Minister-in-charge of Cyber Security and Smart Nation; Tan Kiat How, Senior Minister of State; Jasmin Lau, Senior Minister of State, Minister-in-charge of GovTech; Rahayu Mahzam, Minister of State
- Agency executives: Joseph Leong, Permanent Secretary (Digital Development and Information); Chng Kai Fong, Permanent Secretary (Development); Tan Chye Hee, Permanent Secretary (Information and Development); Yap Neng Jye, Chief of Government Communications; David Koh, Chief Executive of CSA and Chief of Digital Security and Technology; Poon Hong Yuen, Deputy Secretary (Digital Economy and International); Sim Feng Ji, Deputy Secretary (Digital Government); Gwenda Fong, Deputy Secretary (Digital Society and Development)
- Child agencies: Cyber Security Agency; Infocomm Media Development Authority; Government Technology Agency; National Library Board; Personal Data Protection Commission; REACH
- Website: mddi.gov.sg
- Agency ID: T08GA0017L

The Ministry of Digital Development and Information (MDDI; Malay: Kementerian Penerangan dan Pembangunan Digital; Chinese: 数码发展及新闻部; Tamil: தகவல், மின்னிலக்க மேம்பாட்டு அமைச்சு) is a ministry of the Government of Singapore responsible for regulating communications, news media, and the government's public communication. It is also responsible for administering the national library, national archives, and public libraries.

== History ==
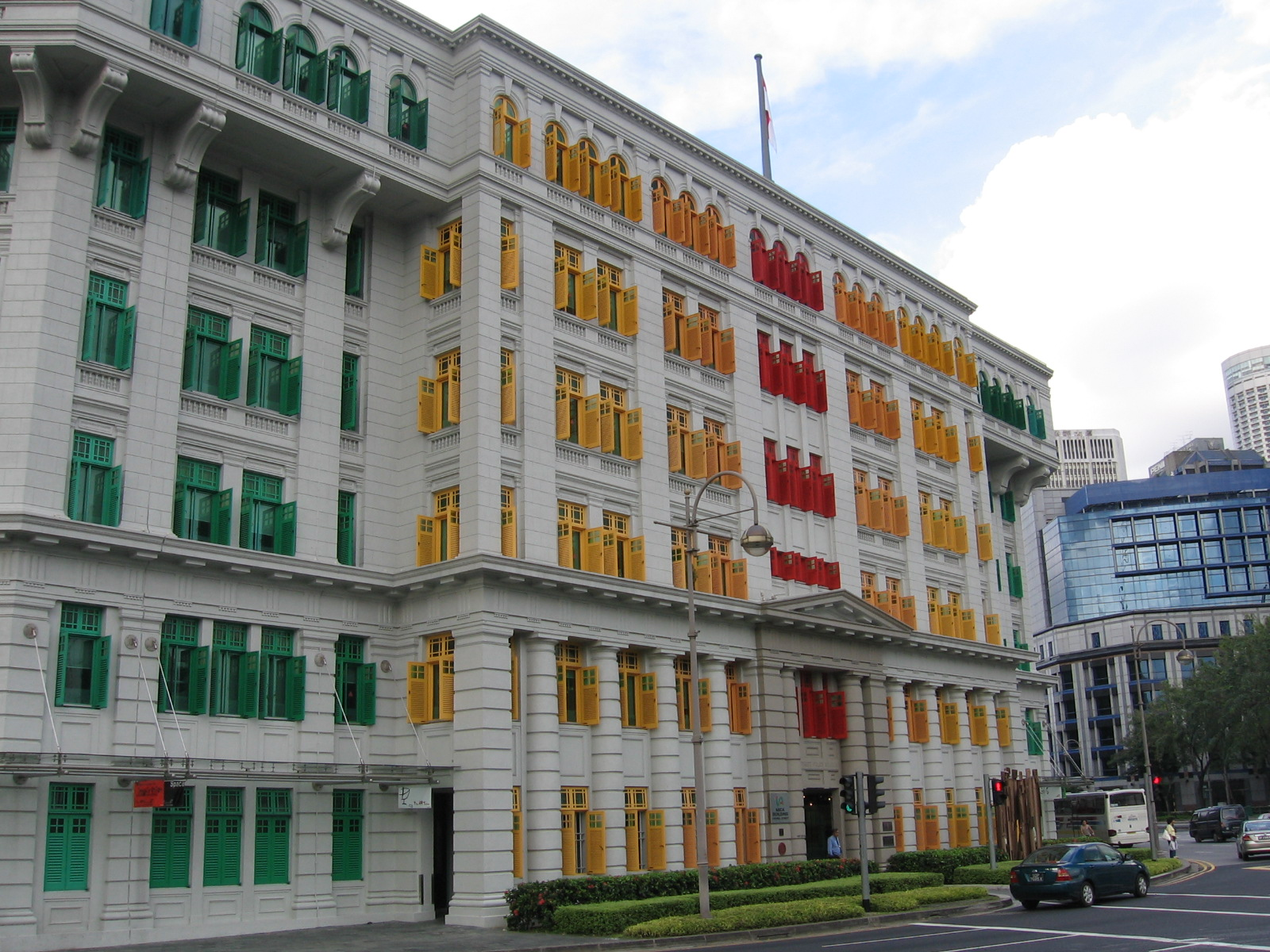
The Old Hill Street Police Station is currently the headquarters of the Ministry of Digital Development and Information

Former logo of MCI until 2024

On 5 June 1959, the Ministry of Culture came into being with the swearing-in and appointments of ministers of the new Government of Singapore. On 1 February 1980, the Broadcasting Division of the Ministry of Culture became a statutory board, the Singapore Broadcasting Corporation.

1985 saw the dissolution of the Ministry of Culture. Its Information Division came under the new Ministry of Communications and Information (MCI). Its arts promotion component was assimilated into the Ministry of Community Development (MCD) as the Cultural Affairs Division.

Five years later, on 28 November 1990, the Information Division of the MCI and the Cultural Affairs Division of MCD, together with other associated departments and statutory boards, reunited to form the Ministry of Information and the Arts (MITA).

On 1 September 1991, the Festival of Arts Secretariat, Singapore Cultural Foundation, the Arts Division of MITA, and the National Theatre Trust merged to form the National Arts Council (NAC).

On 1 October 1994, the Singapore Broadcasting Authority (SBA) was formed as a statutory board under MITA to oversee and promote the broadcasting industry in Singapore.

On 23 November 2001, the information and communications technology (ICT) functions under the Ministry of Communications and Information Technology came under MITA. The expanded ministry was renamed the Ministry of Information, Communications and the Arts, but retained the acronym MITA. In that year, Infocomm Development Authority (IDA) became one of MITA's statutory boards.

On 1 January 2003, the Singapore Broadcasting Authority, Singapore Films Commission and Films and Publications Department (previously under the MITA headquarters) merged to form the Media Development Authority (MDA). On 13 August 2004, the ministry's acronym was changed from "MITA" to "MICA".

On 1 November 2012, MICA was renamed the Ministry of Communications and Information (MCI). The move followed the restructuring of two previous ministries – MICA and the Ministry of Community Development, Youth and Sports (MCYS) – into MCI, the Ministry of Culture, Community and Youth (MCCY) and the Ministry of Social and Family Development (MSF). REACH (Reaching Everyone for Active Citizenry @ Home) was assimilated into MCI while the resilience, arts and heritage portfolios became part of MCCY. MCI oversees the development of the information and communications technology, media and design sectors, public libraries, and the Government's information and public communication policies.

On 18 January 2016, MCI announced that the Infocomm Development Authority of Singapore (IDA) and the Media Development Authority (MDA) will be restructured into two new entities: The Info-communications Media Development Authority (IMDA) and the Government Technology Organisation (GTO) (now Government Technology Agency; GovTech), in the second half of 2016. The new statutory boards were formed on 1 October 2016.

On 8 July 2024, MCI was renamed the Ministry of Digital Development and Information (MDDI). It aims to recognise a landscape where digital solutions will become more common.

== Organisational structure ==
MDDI has two statutory boards, the Infocomm Media Development Authority (IMDA) and the National Library Board (NLB).

MDDI also manages the Cyber Security Agency, a national agency overseeing cybersecurity strategy, operations, education, outreach, and ecosystem development and the Personal Data Protection Commission, Singapore's primary data protection authority.

== Ministers ==
The ministry is headed by the Minister for Digital Development and Information, who is appointed as part of the Cabinet of Singapore. The incubment Minister is Josephine Teo, an MP for Jalan Besar GRC from the People's Action Party.

=== Minister for Culture (1959–1985) ===
Minister	Took office	Left office	Party	Cabinet
S. Rajaratnam; MP for Kampong Glam (1915–2006)	5 June 1959	11 August 1965	PAP	Lee K. I
S. Rajaratnam; MP for Kampong Glam (1915–2006)	5 June 1959	11 August 1965	PAP	Lee K. II
Othman Wok; MP for Pasir Panjang (1924–2017)	12 August 1965	15 April 1968	PAP	Lee K. II
Jek Yeun Thong; MP for Queenstown (1930–2018)	16 April 1968	25 September 1977	PAP	Lee K. III
Jek Yeun Thong; MP for Queenstown (1930–2018)	16 April 1968	25 September 1977	PAP	Lee K. IV
Jek Yeun Thong; MP for Queenstown (1930–2018)	16 April 1968	25 September 1977	PAP	Lee K. V
Ong Teng Cheong; MP for Kim Keat (1936–2002); Acting	26 September 1977	5 January 1981	PAP	Lee K. V
S. Dhanabalan; MP for Kallang (born 1937)	6 January 1981	1 January 1985	PAP	Lee K. VI

=== Minister for Communications (1968–1985) ===
Minister	Took office	Left office	Party	Cabinet
Yong Nyuk Lin; MP for Geylang West (1918–2012)	16 April 1968	31 July 1975	PAP	Lee K. III
Yong Nyuk Lin; MP for Geylang West (1918–2012)	16 April 1968	31 July 1975	PAP	Lee K. IV
Lim Kim San; MP for Cairnhill (1916–2006)	1 August 1975	30 June 1978	PAP	Lee K. IV
Lim Kim San; MP for Cairnhill (1916–2006)	1 August 1975	30 June 1978	PAP	Lee K. V
Ong Teng Cheong; MP for Kim Keat (1936–2002)	1 July 1978	8 May 1983	PAP	Lee K. V
Ong Teng Cheong; MP for Kim Keat (1936–2002)	1 July 1978	8 May 1983	PAP	Lee K. VI
Ong Pang Boon; MP for Telok Ayer (born 1929)	9 May 1983	6 September 1983	PAP	Lee K. VI
Yeo Ning Hong (Note: Yeo Ning Hong served as acting minister from 7 September 1983 until 31 May 1984.); MP for Kim Seng (born 1943)	7 September 1983	31 May 1984	PAP	Lee K. VI
Yeo Ning Hong; MP for Kim Seng (born 1943)	1 June 1984	1 January 1985	PAP	Lee K. VI

=== Minister for Communications and Information (1985–1990) ===
Minister	Took office	Left office	Party	Cabinet
Yeo Ning Hong; MP for Kim Seng SMC (born 1943)	2 January 1985	27 November 1990	PAP	Lee K. VII
Yeo Ning Hong; MP for Kim Seng SMC (born 1943)	2 January 1985	27 November 1990	PAP	Lee K. VIII

=== Minister for Communications (1990–1999) ===
Minister	Took office	Left office	Party	Cabinet
Yeo Ning Hong; MP for Kim Seng SMC (born 1943)	28 November 1990	30 June 1991	PAP	Goh I
Mah Bow Tan (Note: Mah Bow Tan served as acting minister from 1 July until 6 September 1991.); MP for Tampines GRC (born 1948)	1 July 1991	6 September 1991	PAP	Goh I
Mah Bow Tan; MP for Tampines GRC (born 1948)	7 September 1991	2 June 1999	PAP	Goh II
Mah Bow Tan; MP for Tampines GRC (born 1948)	7 September 1991	2 June 1999	PAP	Goh III

=== Minister for Information and the Arts (1990–2001) ===
Minister	Took office	Left office	Party	Cabinet
George Yeo (Note: George Yeo served as acting minister from 28 November 1990 until 30 June 1991.); MP for Aljunied GRC (born 1954)	28 November 1990	30 June 1991	PAP	Goh I
George Yeo; MP for Aljunied GRC (born 1954)	1 July 1991	2 June 1999	PAP	Goh I
George Yeo; MP for Aljunied GRC (born 1954)	1 July 1991	2 June 1999	PAP	Goh II
George Yeo; MP for Aljunied GRC (born 1954)	1 July 1991	2 June 1999	PAP	Goh III
Lee Yock Suan; MP for Cheng San GRC (born 1946)	3 June 1999	22 November 2001	PAP	Goh III

=== Minister for Communications and Information Technology (1999–2001) ===
Minister	Took office	Left office	Party	Cabinet
Yeo Cheow Tong; MP for Hong Kah GRC (born 1948)	3 June 1999	22 November 2001	PAP	Goh III

=== Minister for Information, Communications and the Arts (2001–2012) ===
Minister	Took office	Left office	Party	Cabinet
David Lim; MP for Holland-Bukit Panjang GRC; Acting	23 November 2001	11 May 2003	PAP	Goh IV
Lee Boon Yang; MP for Jalan Besar GRC (born 1947)	12 May 2003	31 March 2009	PAP	Goh IV
Lee Boon Yang; MP for Jalan Besar GRC (born 1947)	12 May 2003	31 March 2009	PAP	Lee H. I
Lee Boon Yang; MP for Jalan Besar GRC (born 1947)	12 May 2003	31 March 2009	PAP	Lee H. II
Lui Tuck Yew (Note: Lui Tuck Yew served as acting minister from 1 April 2009 until 31 October 2010.); MP for Tanjong Pagar GRC (until 2011) and Moulmein-Kallang GRC (from 2011) (born 1961)	1 April 2009	31 October 2010	PAP	Lee H. II
Lui Tuck Yew; MP for Tanjong Pagar GRC (until 2011) and Moulmein-Kallang GRC (from 2011) (born 1961)	1 November 2010	20 May 2011	PAP	Lee H. II
Yaacob Ibrahim; MP for Moulmein–Kallang GRC (born 1955)	21 May 2011	31 October 2012	PAP	Lee H. III

=== Minister for Communications and Information (2012–2024) ===
Minister	Took office	Left office	Party	Cabinet
Yaacob Ibrahim; MP for Moulmein–Kallang GRC (until 2015) and Jalan Besar GRC (from 2015) (born 1955)	1 November 2012	30 April 2018	PAP	Lee H. III
Yaacob Ibrahim; MP for Moulmein–Kallang GRC (until 2015) and Jalan Besar GRC (from 2015) (born 1955)	1 November 2012	30 April 2018	PAP	Lee H. IV
S. Iswaran; MP for West Coast GRC (born 1962)	1 May 2018	14 May 2021	PAP	Lee H. IV
S. Iswaran; MP for West Coast GRC (born 1962)	1 May 2018	14 May 2021	PAP	Lee H. V
Josephine Teo; MP for Jalan Besar GRC (born 1968)	15 May 2021	7 July 2024	PAP	Lee H. V
Josephine Teo; MP for Jalan Besar GRC (born 1968)	15 May 2021	7 July 2024	PAP	Wong I

=== Minister for Digital Development and Information (2024–present) ===
Minister	Took office	Left office	Party	Cabinet
Josephine Teo; MP for Jalan Besar GRC (born 1968)	8 July 2024	Incumbent	PAP	Wong I
Josephine Teo; MP for Jalan Besar GRC (born 1968)	8 July 2024	Incumbent	PAP	Wong II
