= Lim Hwee Hua =

Singaporean politician

- 林陈惠华
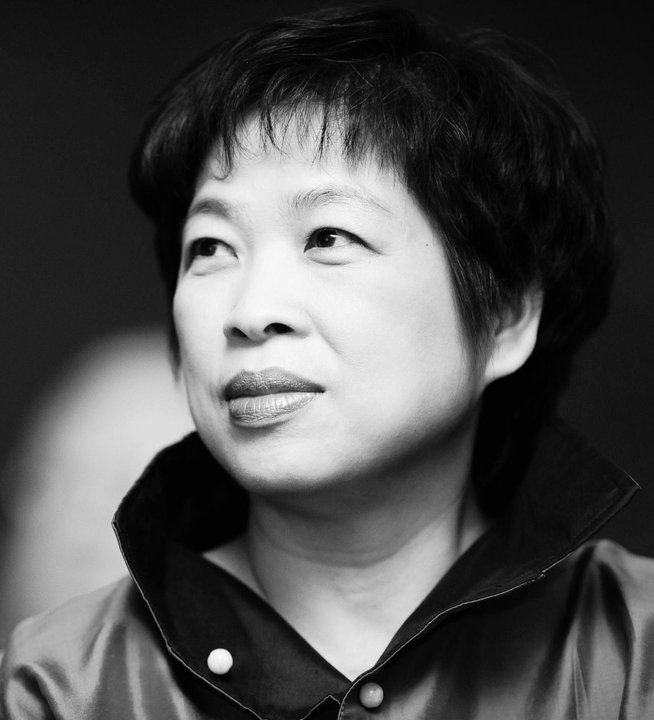
- Lim in 2010

Minister in the Prime Minister's Office
- In office 1 April 2009 – 20 May 2011 Serving with Lim Boon Heng and Lim Swee Say
- Prime Minister: Lee Hsien Loong
- Succeeded by: S. Iswaran; Grace Fu

Second Minister for Finance
- In office 1 April 2009 – 20 May 2011
- Prime Minister: Lee Hsien Loong
- Minister: Tharman Shanmugaratnam
- Succeeded by: Lawrence Wong

Second Minister for Transport
- In office 1 April 2009 – 20 May 2011
- Prime Minister: Lee Hsien Loong
- Minister: Raymond Lim
- Succeeded by: Ng Chee Meng

Senior Minister of State for Finance
- In office 1 April 2008 – 1 April 2009
- Prime Minister: Lee Hsien Loong
- Minister: Tharman Shanmugaratnam

Senior Minister of State for Transport
- In office 1 April 2008 – 1 April 2009
- Prime Minister: Lee Hsien Loong
- Minister: Raymond Lim

Minister of State for Finance
- In office 12 August 2004 – 1 April 2008
- Prime Minister: Lee Hsien Loong
- Minister: Lee Hsien Loong; Tharman Shanmugaratnam
- Succeeded by: Josephine Teo

Minister of State for Transport
- In office 12 August 2004 – 1 April 2008
- Prime Minister: Lee Hsien Loong
- Minister: Yeo Cheow Tong
- Succeeded by: Josephine Teo

Deputy Speaker of Parliament
- In office 1 April 2002 – 11 August 2004
- Prime Minister: Goh Chok Tong
- Preceded by: Eugene Yap Giau Cheng
- Succeeded by: Chew Heng Chin

Member of Parliament for Aljunied GRC
- In office 6 May 2006 – 7 May 2011
- Preceded by: PAP held
- Succeeded by: WP gain
- Majority: 12,460 (12.18%)

Member of Parliament for Marine Parade GRC
- In office 23 December 1996 – 6 May 2006
- Preceded by: PAP held
- Succeeded by: PAP held
- Majority: 1997: N/A (walkover); 2001: N/A (walkover)

Personal details
- Born: Tan Hwee Hua; 26 February 1959 (age 67) Colony of Singapore
- Other political affiliations: People's Action Party (1996–2011)
- Spouse: Andy Lim
- Children: 3
- Education: Girton College, Cambridge; University of California, Los Angeles

Lim-Tan Hwee Hua (Note: Chinese: 陈惠华; Pe̍h-ōe-jī: Lîm-Tân Hūi-hôa; pinyin: Lín-Chén Huìhuá) (née Tan; born 26 February 1959) is a Singaporean businesswoman and former politician. A former member of the governing People's Action Party (PAP), Lim was a Member of Parliament (MP) for Marine Parade Group Representation Constituency (GRC) from 1996 to 2006, and for Aljunied GRC from 2006 to 2011.

Lim has served as Minister in the Prime Minister's Office, Second Minister for Finance and Second Minister for Transport concurrently between 2009 and 2011. She has served as served as Deputy Speaker of Parliament between 2002 and 2004, Senior Minister of State for Finance and Senior Minister of State for Transport concurrently between 2008 and 2009, and Minister of State for Finance and Minister of State for Transport concurrently between 2004 and 2008.

== Early life and career ==
Lim was educated at Raffles Institution, before graduating from Girton College at the University of Cambridge in 1981, majoring in mathematics and engineering, under the Overseas Merit Scholarship.

She subsequently went on to complete a Master of Business Administration degree in finance at Anderson School of Management at the University of California, Los Angeles in 1989.

Lim began her career as an administrative officer in the Ministry of Finance (MOF), Ministry of Education (MOE) and the Ministry of Law (MinLaw).

In 1989, she joined Swiss Bank Corporation as an investment analyst before moving on to Jardine Fleming in 1992, where she served as Head of Research and Director of Business Development.

In 2000, she joined Temasek Holdings as Managing Director of Corporate Stewardship and later, Managing Director of Strategic Relations. While she was at Temasek Holdings, she sat on boards including Port of Singapore Authority, Keppel Corporation and Mapletree.

== Political career ==
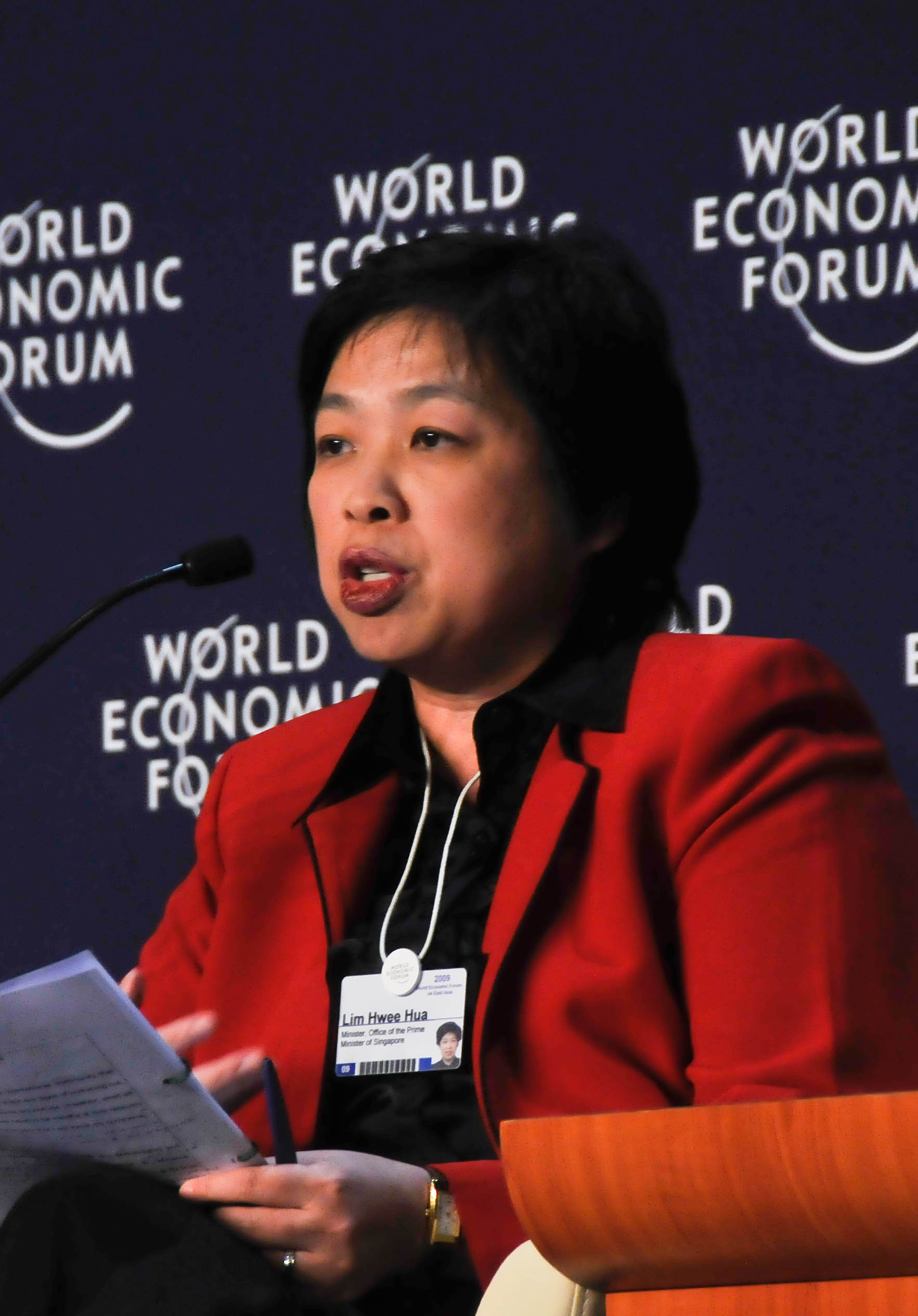
Lim in 2009

Lim made her political debut in Marine Parade GRC at the 1997 general election as part of a six-member PAP team, which won in a walkover; she became a MP. In the 2001 general election, she remained in the GRC as part of a six-member team, experiencing a second walkover. From 1 April 2002 to 11 August 2004, she was the Deputy Speaker of Parliament and Chairperson of the Public Accounts Committee. Lim was appointed the Minister of State for Finance and Transport on 12 August 2004.

At the 2006 general election, after her Serangoon division was shifted to Aljunied GRC, Lim contested in said GRC as part of a five-member PAP team; they defeated the Workers' Party (WP) with 56.09% of the vote. She was promoted to Senior Minister of State for Finance and Transport on 1 April 2008.

On 1 April 2009, Lim become the first woman to serve in Singapore's Cabinet when she was made a Minister in the Prime Minister's Office, Second Minister for Finance and Second Minister for Transport.

Between 2002 and 2011, Lim was a member of the Central Executive Committee of the PAP, and the Chairman of the party's Women's Wing. She was inducted into the Singapore Council of Women's Organisation (SCWO) Hall of Fame on 31 March 2010, and she received the Her World Woman of the Year Award on 23 April 2010.

In the 2011 general election, Lim led the PAP team for Aljunied GRC alongside fellow minister George Yeo, but lost to the WP with 45.28% of the vote. She subsequently stepped down from the Central Executive Committee (CEC) of the PAP and announced her retirement from politics, saying she was surprised by the depth of resentment felt by citizens towards the government.

== Post-political career ==
Following her retirement from politics, Lim was appointed Non-Executive Director at Jardine Cycle & Carriage in July 2011. In October 2011, Lim was appointed as a senior advisor at Kohlberg Kravis Roberts. In November 2011, Lim was appointed Independent Non-Executive Director on the Global Advisory Council at Ernst & Young. She published a book, Government In Business: Friend Or Foe?, with the Straits Times Press in 2013. She had also served as Honorary Chairman of the Securities Investors Association Singapore between 2013 and 2017.

== Personal life ==
Lim grew up in family of nine children in Tiong Bahru. Her father was a tea merchant. Lim is married to Andy Lim, a partner and founder of Tembusu Partners, a private equity firm. They have a son and two daughters.
