= Lee Boon Yang =

Singaporean politician

- 李文献
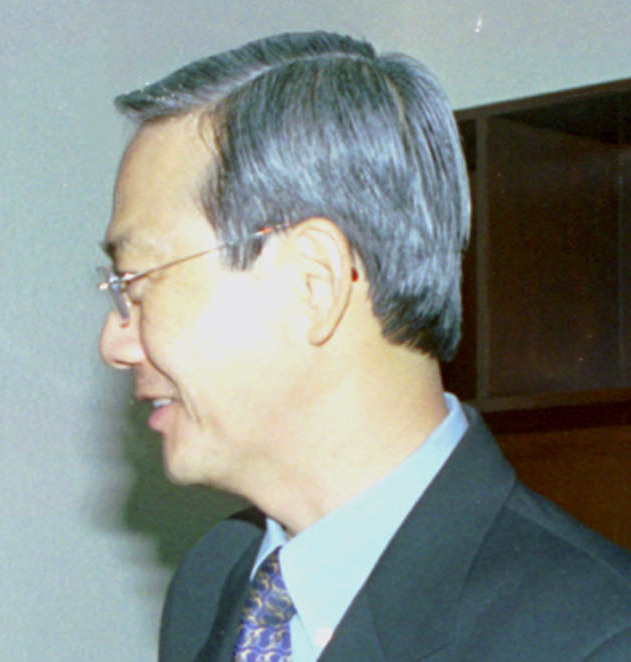
- Lee in 2005

Minister for Information, Communications and the Arts
- In office 12 May 2003 – 31 March 2009
- Prime Minister: Goh Chok Tong; Lee Hsien Loong
- Second Minister: Vivian Balakrishnan (2006–2008)
- Preceded by: David Lim
- Succeeded by: Lui Tuck Yew

Minister for Defence
- In office 2 July 1994 – 31 July 1995; 2nd Minister: 7 September 1991-1 July 1994
- Prime Minister: Goh Chok Tong
- Preceded by: Yeo Ning Hong
- Succeeded by: Tony Tan

Minister for Manpower
- In office 2 January 1992 – 12 May 2003
- Prime Minister: Goh Chok Tong
- Preceded by: Lee Yock Suan
- Succeeded by: Ng Eng Hen

Minister in the Prime Minister's Office
- In office 1 July 1991 – 1 January 1992
- Prime Minister: Goh Chok Tong

Party Whip of the People's Action Party
- In office 13 September 1988 – 31 March 2007
- Preceded by: Lee Yiok Seng
- Succeeded by: Lim Swee Say

Member of the Singapore Parliament for Jalan Besar GRC
- In office 3 September 1988 – 18 April 2011
- Preceded by: Constituency established
- Succeeded by: Constituency abolished

Member of the Singapore Parliament for Jalan Besar Constituency
- In office 22 December 1984 – 17 August 1988
- Preceded by: Chan Chee Seng
- Succeeded by: Constituency abolished

Personal details
- Born: Lee Boon Yang; 1 October 1947 (age 79) Colony of Singapore
- Party: People's Action Party (1984–2011)
- Spouse: Yap Mee Mee
- Children: 1
- Relatives: Lee Boon Wang (brother); Chua Mia Tee (brother-in-law)
- Education: University of Queensland (BVSc)

Lee Boon Yang (Note: Chinese: 李文献; Pe̍h-ūe-jī: Lí Bûng-hiàng; pinyin: Lǐ Wénxiàn) (born 1 October 1947) is a Singaporean former politician who served as Minister for Information, Communications and the Arts between 2003 and 2009, Minister for Manpower between 1992 and 2003, and Minister for Defence in 1994 and 1995. A former member of the governing People's Action Party (PAP), he was the Member of Parliament (MP) for Jalan Besar Constituency between 1984 and 1988, and the Jalan Besar division of Jalan Besar Group Representation Constituency (GRC) between 1988 and 2011.

Lee retired from politics in 2011, and served as Chairman of Singapore Press Holdings between 2011 and 2022.

== Education ==
Lee was awarded a Colombo Plan scholarship to study veterinary science at the University of Queensland, where he graduated with a Bachelor of Veterinary Science degree in 1971.

In 2015, Lee was conferred an honorary doctorate by the University of Queensland.

== Career ==
Lee began his career as a veterinary surgeon and worked as a research and development officer in the Singapore Government's Primary Production Department between 1972 and 1981.

Lee subsequently worked at the US Feed Grains Council as Assistant Regional Director and later Senior Project Manager for Primary Industries Enterprise between 1981 and 1984.

=== Political career ===
Lee was first elected to Parliament in 1984.

He was subsequently appointed Parliamentary Secretary in 1985, and went on to hold positions in the Ministry of the Environment, Ministry of Communications and Information, Ministry of Finance and the Ministry of Home Affairs.

Lee was appointed Minister in the Prime Minister's Office in 1991. He served as Minister for Labour between 1992 and 2003. He simultaneously also served as Minister for Defence in 1994 and 1995. He was subsequently appointed Minister for Information, Communications and the Arts in 2003, where he served until 2009.

Lee resigned from the Cabinet in 2009 but remained as a Member of Parliament on the backbenches until his retirement from politics in 2011.

=== Post-political career ===
Lee was appointed Chairman of the Board of Keppel Corporation in 2009, after resigning from the Cabinet, where he served until 2021.

He also served as Chairman of Singapore Press Holdings between 2011 and 2022, before he was succeeded by Christopher Lim.

== Personal life ==
Lee has an elder brother Lee Boon Wang, a landscape painter, and a sister Lee Boon Ngan.

Lee is married to Yap Mee Mee and they have a daughter.

== Notes ==
Political offices
Preceded by Lee Yock Suan as Minister for Labour	Minister for Labour; 2 January 1992 – 31 March 1998	Succeeded by Ng Eng Hen as Acting Minister for Manpower
Preceded by Lee Yock Suan as Minister for Labour	Minister for Manpower; 1 April 1998 – 12 May 2003	Succeeded by Ng Eng Hen as Acting Minister for Manpower
Preceded by Yeo Ning Hong	Minister for Defence; 2 July 1994 – 1 August 1995	Succeeded by Tony Tan
Preceded by David Lim	Minister for Information, Communications and the Arts; 12 May 2003 – 1 April 2009	Succeeded by Lui Tuck Yew
