= Prime Minister's Office (Singapore) =

Agency overview
- Jurisdiction: Government of Singapore
- Headquarters: The Istana
- Motto: Together We Lead
- Employees: 1312 (2025)
- Annual budget: ▲ S$1.18 billion (2025)
- Ministers responsible: Lawrence Wong, Prime Minister & Minister for Finance; Gan Kim Yong, Deputy Prime Minister & Minister for Trade and Industry; Lee Hsien Loong, Senior Minister; K Shanmugam, Senior Minister & Coordinating Minister for National Security; Chan Chun Sing, Coordinating Minister for Public Services; Ong Ye Kung, Coordinating Minister for Social Policies; Indranee Rajah, Minister in the Prime Minister's Office; Ng Chee Meng, Minister in the Prime Minister's Office
- Agency executives: Chan Heng Kee, Head of the Civil Service, Permanent Secretary (Prime Minister's Office); Chow Choi Foon, Permanent Secretary (PMO) (Strategy); Lai Chung Han, Permanent Secretary (Prime Minister's Office)(Special Duties)
- Child agencies: Civil Service College; Corrupt Practices Investigation Bureau; Cyber Security Agency; Elections Department of Singapore; Monetary Authority of Singapore; National Research Foundation; National Security Coordination Secretariat; Public Service Division; Smart Nation and Digital Government Group; Strategy Group
- Website: www.pmo.gov.sg
- Agency ID: T08GA0024F

The Prime Minister's Office (PMO; Malay: Pejabat Perdana Menteri; Chinese: 总理公署; Tamil: பிரதமர் அலுவலகம்) forms a part of the executive branch of the Government of Singapore, tasked with overseeing other ministries and managing key political matters of national significance, such as combating corruption, conducting elections and overseeing financial regulations.

The PMO is led by the prime minister alongside other appointed ministers. It operates from The Istana, which also serves as the official residence and office of the President of Singapore. In the context of Singapore's Westminster parliamentary system, the PMO functions similarly to a minister without portfolio. This was formerly an official Cabinet designation, referring to a minister who holds Cabinet rank without heading a specific ministry.

== Statutory boards ==
The PMO oversees 14 statutory boards including

- Corrupt Practices Investigation Bureau (CPIB)
- Monetary Authority of Singapore (MAS)
- Civil Service College (CSC)
- Elections Department Singapore (ELD)
- Public Service Division (PSD)

== See also ==
- Government of Singapore
- Cabinet of Singapore
- Prime Minister of Singapore
