= Leader of the House (Singapore) =

Officer of the Parliament of Singapore

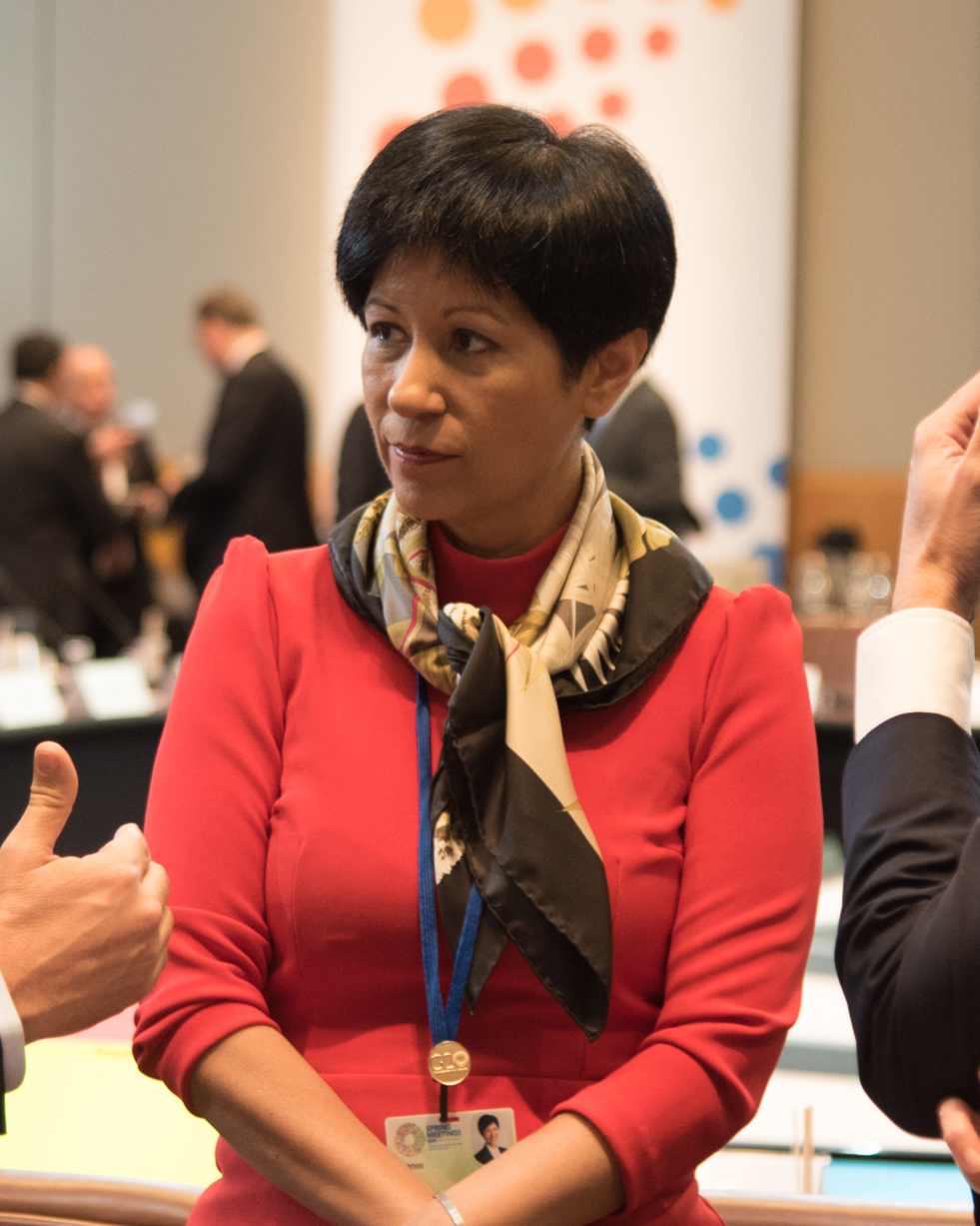
- Incumbent; Indranee Rajah since 24 August 2020
- Parliament of Singapore
- Style: Leader of the House (informal); The Honourable (formal)
- Nominator: Prime Minister of Singapore
- Appointer: Prime Minister of Singapore
- Term length: No term limit
- Formation: 5 June 1959; 67 years ago
- First holder: Toh Chin Chye
- Deputy: Deputy Leader of the House

The leader of the House is a position responsible for arranging government business in the Parliament of Singapore. The leader of the House initiate motions concerning the business of the House during parliamentary sittings, such as actions to be taken on procedural matters and extending sitting times. The incumbent leader of the House is Pasir Ris–Changi GRC MP, Indranee Rajah.

== List of Leaders of the House ==
No.	Portrait	Name Constituency (Birth–Death)	Took office	Left office	Party	Parliament
1		Toh Chin Chye; MP for Rochore (1921–2012)	5 June 1959	15 April 1968	PAP	2nd Legislative Assembly
1		Toh Chin Chye; MP for Rochore (1921–2012)	5 June 1959	15 April 1968	PAP	3rd Legislative Assembly
1		Toh Chin Chye; MP for Rochore (1921–2012)	5 June 1959	15 April 1968	PAP	1st
2		E. W. Barker; MP for Tanglin (1920–2001)	16 April 1968	1 January 1985	PAP	2nd
2		E. W. Barker; MP for Tanglin (1920–2001)	16 April 1968	1 January 1985	PAP	3rd
2		E. W. Barker; MP for Tanglin (1920–2001)	16 April 1968	1 January 1985	PAP	4th
2		E. W. Barker; MP for Tanglin (1920–2001)	16 April 1968	1 January 1985	PAP	5th
3		S. Dhanabalan; MP for Kallang (born 1937)	2 January 1985	24 February 1987	PAP	6th
4		Wong Kan Seng; MP for Kuo Chuan (until 1988), Toa Payoh GRC (1988–1991), Thomson GRC (1991–1997) and Bishan–Toa Payoh GRC (from 1997) (born 1946)	25 February 1987	31 March 2007	PAP	6th
4		Wong Kan Seng; MP for Kuo Chuan (until 1988), Toa Payoh GRC (1988–1991), Thomson GRC (1991–1997) and Bishan–Toa Payoh GRC (from 1997) (born 1946)	25 February 1987	31 March 2007	PAP	7th
4		Wong Kan Seng; MP for Kuo Chuan (until 1988), Toa Payoh GRC (1988–1991), Thomson GRC (1991–1997) and Bishan–Toa Payoh GRC (from 1997) (born 1946)	25 February 1987	31 March 2007	PAP	8th
4		Wong Kan Seng; MP for Kuo Chuan (until 1988), Toa Payoh GRC (1988–1991), Thomson GRC (1991–1997) and Bishan–Toa Payoh GRC (from 1997) (born 1946)	25 February 1987	31 March 2007	PAP	9th
4		Wong Kan Seng; MP for Kuo Chuan (until 1988), Toa Payoh GRC (1988–1991), Thomson GRC (1991–1997) and Bishan–Toa Payoh GRC (from 1997) (born 1946)	25 February 1987	31 March 2007	PAP	10th
4		Wong Kan Seng; MP for Kuo Chuan (until 1988), Toa Payoh GRC (1988–1991), Thomson GRC (1991–1997) and Bishan–Toa Payoh GRC (from 1997) (born 1946)	25 February 1987	31 March 2007	PAP	11th
5		Mah Bow Tan; MP for Tampines GRC (born 1948)	1 April 2007	30 May 2011	PAP	11th
6		Ng Eng Hen; MP for Bishan–Toa Payoh GRC (born 1958)	31 May 2011	30 September 2015	PAP	12th
7		Grace Fu; MP for Yuhua SMC (born 1964)	1 October 2015	23 August 2020	PAP	13th
8		Indranee Rajah; MP for Tanjong Pagar GRC (until 2025) and Pasir Ris–Changi GRC (from 2025) (born 1963)	24 August 2020	Incumbent	PAP	14th
8		Indranee Rajah; MP for Tanjong Pagar GRC (until 2025) and Pasir Ris–Changi GRC (from 2025) (born 1963)	24 August 2020	Incumbent	PAP	15th

== List of Deputy Leaders of the House ==
No.	Portrait	Name Constituency (Birth–Death)	Took office	Left office	Party	Leader of the House	Parliament
1		Mah Bow Tan; MP for Tampines GRC (born 1948)	1 April 2002	31 March 2007	PAP	Wong Kan Seng	10th
1		Mah Bow Tan; MP for Tampines GRC (born 1948)	1 April 2002	31 March 2007	PAP	Wong Kan Seng	11th
2		Ng Eng Hen; MP for Bishan–Toa Payoh GRC (born 1958)	1 April 2007	30 May 2011	PAP	Mah Bow Tan	11th
3		Heng Chee How; MP for Whampoa SMC (born 1961)	31 May 2011	30 September 2015	PAP	Ng Eng Hen	12th
4		Desmond Lee; MP for Jurong GRC (born 1976)	1 October 2015	23 August 2020	PAP	Grace Fu	13th
5		Zaqy Mohamad; MP for Marsiling–Yew Tee GRC (born 1974)	24 August 2020	Incumbent	PAP	Indranee Rajah	14th
5		Zaqy Mohamad; MP for Marsiling–Yew Tee GRC (born 1974)	24 August 2020	Incumbent	PAP	Indranee Rajah	15th
