= Steve Chia =

Singaporean politician (born 1970)

- 谢镜丰

3rd Secretary-General of the Singapore People's Party
- Incumbent
- Assumed office 5 November 2019
- Chairman: Jose Raymond (2019–2020)
- Acting Chairman: Williamson Lee
- Preceded by: Chiam See Tong

Non-constituency Member of the 10th Parliament of Singapore
- In office 5 November 2001 – 18 April 2006
- Preceded by: J. B. Jeyaretnam
- Succeeded by: Sylvia Lim

1st Secretary-General of the National Solidarity Party
- In office 2001–2005
- Preceded by: Position established
- Succeeded by: Goh Meng Seng

Personal details
- Born: Steve Chia Kiah Hong; 3 November 1970 (age 55) Singapore
- Party: Singapore People's Party
- Other political affiliations: National Solidarity Party (1995–2017)
- Spouse: Doreen Chee (m. 1996; div. 2017)
- Children: 3
- Education: Bachelor of Arts from the National University of Singapore
- Occupation: Politician

Steve Chia Kiah Hong (Note: Chinese: 谢镜丰; Pe̍h-ōe-jī: Chiā Kiàⁿ-hong; pinyin: Xiè Jìngfēng) (born 3 November 1970) is a Singaporean politician. He was previously a Non-Constituency Member of Parliament (NCMP) between 2001 and 2006 and has been the Singapore People's Party secretary-general since 2019.

Chia started his political career when he joined the opposition National Solidarity Party (NSP) in 1995 and served as the party's secretary-general from 2001 to 2005. During this time, he contested in four general elections, as a NSP candidate in 1997 and 2011, and under the Singapore Democratic Alliance (SDA) banner in 2001 and 2006 when the NSP was part of the SDA. However, he lost in all four elections to candidates from the governing People's Action Party (PAP).

Chia withdrew from contesting in MacPherson SMC during the 2015 general election after he received online criticism for pushing the NSP to contest in a three-cornered fight in MacPherson against the PAP and the opposition Workers' Party. He left the NSP and joined the SPP in 2018 and became the party's secretary-general in the following year. During the 2020 general election and 2025 general election, he contested as part of a four-member SPP team in Bishan–Toa Payoh Group Representation Constituency, but they lost to the PAP team both times.

== Early life ==
In his youth, Chia was a delinquent who had vandalised school property and had been sent to a boys' home and placed under probation. After that, he went to junior college, where he was a student councillor. While serving his National Service, he got into the Officer Cadet School and served as a manpower officer in a reserve unit of the Singapore Armed Forces.

After completing his National Service, Chia read psychology and philosophy at the National University of Singapore (NUS). During his time in NUS, he was active in student politics and was elected president of the 15th NUS Student Union in this third year.

== Personal life ==
Chia met his wife, Doreen Chee, during a trip to climb Mount Ophir when they were both studying at the National University of Singapore in the early 1990s. They married in 1996 and have two sons and one daughter. They divorced later in 2017.

== Political career ==
=== 1997 General Election ===
After graduating from NUS in 1994, Chia met Tan Chee Kien, the president of the opposition National Solidarity Party (NSP). He joined the party around the end of 1994 and gradually rose to the position of the party's assistant secretary-general and eventually secretary-general. During the 1997 general election, Chia along with Patrick Kee, Tan Chee Kien, Wong Wee Nam and Yadzeth Bin Hairisto form a five-member NSP team to contest in Hong Kah Group Representation Constituency against the governing People's Action Party (PAP) but they lost after garnering 31% of the vote against the PAP team's 69%.

=== 2001 General Election ===
In June 2001, the NSP, under Chia's leadership, joined three other opposition parties (SPP, PKMS and SJP) to form the Singapore Democratic Alliance (SDA). In the general election that year, Chia contested as a solo candidate under the SDA banner in Chua Chu Kang Single Member Constituency. Although Chia ultimately lost to the PAP candidate Low Seow Chay with 34.66% of the vote against Low's 65.34%, he was offered a seat as a Non-constituency Member of Parliament (NCMP) in the 10th Parliament because he was one of the "best losers" in an election in which there were fewer than six elected opposition Members of Parliament. At the time, the 30-year-old Chia was the youngest parliamentarian.

During his term as a NCMP from 5 November 2001 to 18 April 2006, Chia posed questions in Parliament on various issues, including National Service, HDB flats for singles, bus and train fare subsidies, and organ transplants. Chia claimed in a 2020 interview with Mothership that he asked the highest number of questions among all the Members of Parliament in the 10th Parliament.

=== 2006 General Election ===
During the 2006 General Election, Chia contested in Chua Chu Kang SMC again as a SDA candidate, this time against PAP candidate Gan Kim Yong. He lost after garnering 39.63% of the vote against Gan's 60.37%.

=== 2011 General Election ===
The NSP withdrew from the SDA in 2007, so Chia contested under the NSP banner during the 2011 general election, this time in Pioneer Single Member Constituency. He lost after garnering 39.27% of the vote against the PAP candidate Cedric Foo, who won with 60.73%.

=== 2015 General Election ===
Ahead of the 2015 General Election, the NSP announced that it planned to field Chia as a candidate in MacPherson Single Member Constituency. This was a controversial decision as another opposition party, the Workers' Party, had already announced that they would have a candidate contesting against the PAP in MacPherson SMC. On 22 August 2015, Chia released a statement on Facebook announcing that he had decided not to contest in the 2015 general election because he had received a lot of online criticism for pushing the NSP to renege on its deal to avoid a three-cornered fight in MacPherson SMC.

=== 2020 General Election ===
Chia eventually left the NSP and joined another opposition party, the Singapore People's Party (SPP), and became its organising secretary. He was elected secretary-general of the SPP on 5 November 2019.

During the 2020 general election, Chia along with Williamson Lee, Melvyn Chiu and Osman Sulaiman contested in Bishan–Toa Payoh Group Representation Constituency against the PAP team of Ng Eng Hen, Chong Kee Hiong, Chee Hong Tat and Saktiandi Supaat. The SPP team lost with 32.77% of the vote against the PAP team's 67.23%.

=== 2025 General Election ===
In the 2025 General Election, Chia led a four-man team consisting of himself, Melvyn Chiu, Lim Rui Xian and Muhammad Norhakim at Bishan–Toa Payoh Group Representation Constituency, in a straight-fight against the incumbent PAP team. However, the SPP team lost, securing just 24.82% of the vote, or 21,944 votes.

== Legal challenges ==
=== 2003 nude photo scandal ===
In 2003, Chia's wife Doreen Chee, who was then pregnant with their first child, made a police report against her husband, alleging that he had molested their Indonesian domestic helper. The report came after she discovered photos of him and their helper, both naked, in the recycle bin of his computer. Their helper told the police that she was not forced into posing for the pictures, while Chia publicly admitted to taking the photos, confessing that he had an interest in nude photography. Chia also resigned from his positions as NSP secretary-general and SDA executive council member to save the NSP and SDA from further embarrassment, but remained a NCMP.

=== 2006 driving incident ===
In 2006, Chia was fined for driving his car across a traffic junction when the red light was on, resulting in a crash with a bus.

== Notes ==
Political offices
Parliament of Singapore
Preceded by J.B. Jeyaretnam	Non-Constituency Member of Parliament; 2001 – 2006	Succeeded by Sylvia Lim
