= Elysa Chen =

Singaporean politician

The Honourable Elysa Chen
- 陈诗韵
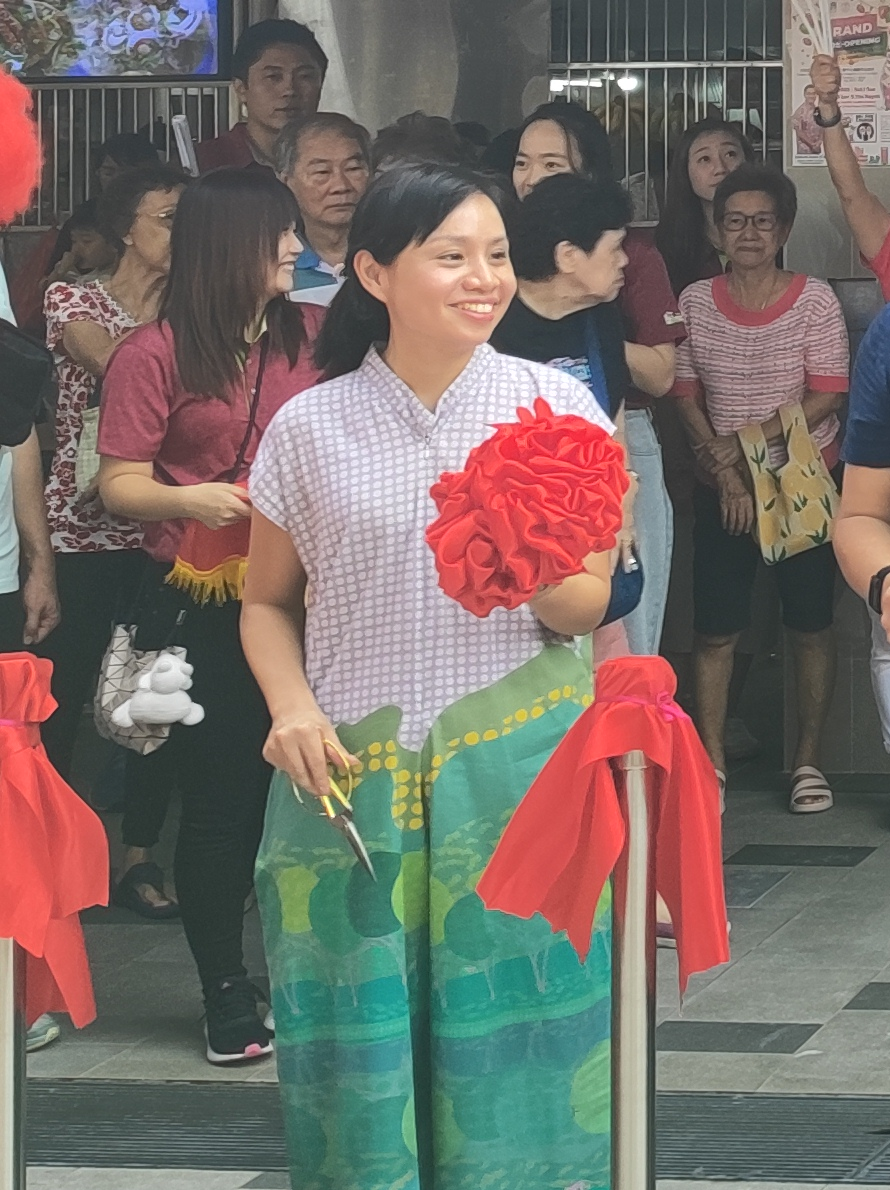
- Chen in 2025

Member of the Singapore Parliament for Bishan–Toa Payoh GRC
- Incumbent
- Assumed office 3 May 2025
- Preceded by: PAP held
- Majority: 44,511 (50.36%)

Personal details
- Born: Elysa Chen Shiyun; 29 February 1984 (age 42)
- Party: People's Action Party
- Spouse: Jonathan Huang
- Children: 1
- Education: Nanyang Technological University

Elysa Chen Shiyun (Note: Chinese: 陈诗韵; pinyin: Chén Shīyùn) (born 29 February 1984) is a Singaporean politician. A member of the governing People's Action Party (PAP), she has been the Member of Parliament (MP), as part of a PAP team, representing Bishan–Toa Payoh Group Representation Constituency (GRC) since 2025.

== Early life ==
When Chen was sixteen years old, her father died of cancer prior to her O-level (Note: Singapore-Cambridge GCE Ordinary Level.) examinations.

Chen was educated at Raffles Junior College before graduating from Nanyang Technological University with a bachelor's degree in communication and media studies. In 2016, Chen completed her studies at Trinity Theological College and received a Master of Divinity.

== Career ==
Chen began her career as a crime reporter with Singapore Press Holdings from 2007 to 2011. She later worked as a lecturer at Hwa Chong Institution and as a church pastor. Since 2018, Chen has been the Executive Director of CampusImpact, a youth-centred social service agency.

=== Political career ===
Chen began serving as a district councillor on the North West Community Development Council in 2020. In 2024, she joined the Punggol Coast Citizens' Consultative Committee.

Chen made her political debut in the 2025 general election, contesting the four-member Bishan–Toa Payoh GRC under the PAP banner. The PAP team defeated Steve Chia and his team representing the Singapore People's Party (SPP) with 75.18% of the vote. Chen has served as the Vice-Chairman of the Bishan-Toa Payoh Town Council (BTPTC) since 2025.

== Personal life ==
Chen is married to Jonathan Huang, Director of Administry at Wesley Methodist Church. They have a son.

== Notes ==
Parliament of Singapore
Preceded by Chong Kee Hiong; Chee Hong Tat; Ng Eng Hen; Saktiandi Supaat	Member of Parliament for Bishan–Toa Payoh GRC; 2025 – present Served alongside: (2025 – present): Chee Hong Tat, Cai Yinzhou, Saktiandi Supaat	Incumbent
