= Davinder Singh (lawyer) =

Singaporean politician and lawyer

Davinder Singh SC
- ਦਵਿੰਦਰ ਸਿੰਘ

Member of Parliament for Bishan–Toa Payoh GRC
- In office 2 January 1997 – 6 May 2006
- Preceded by: Constituency established
- Succeeded by: PAP held
- Majority: 1997: N/A (walkover); 2001: N/A (walkover)

Member of Parliament for Toa Payoh GRC
- In office 3 September 1988 – 16 December 1996
- Preceded by: Constituency established
- Succeeded by: Constituency abolished
- Majority: 1988: N/A (walkover); 1991: N/A (walkover)

Personal details
- Born: Davinder Singh Sachdev; 1 August 1957 (age 69) Colony of Singapore
- Other political affiliations: People's Action Party (1988—2006)
- Children: 2
- Education: National University of Singapore (LLB)
- Occupation: Lawyer

Davinder Singh Sachdev (Note: Punjabi: ਦਵਿੰਦਰ ਸਿੰਘ ਸੱਚਦੇਵ, romanized: Daviṅdar Siṅgh Sacdēv) (born 1 August 1957) is a Singaporean lawyer and former politician. A former member of the governing People's Action Party (PAP), he was the Member of Parliament (MP) representing the Toa Payoh division of Toa Payoh Group Representation Constituency (GRC) between 1988 and 1991 and the Toa Payoh East division of Bishan–Toa Payoh GRC between 1997 and 2006.

Singh has worked at the law firm Drew & Napier for 37 years, spending 17 years as its chief executive officer, and the last two as executive chairman. In 2019, Singh left Drew & Napier to start his own law firm, Davinder Singh Chambers. Singh is widely regarded as Singapore's top litigator, he is best known for representing Singapore prime ministers Lee Kuan Yew and Lee Hsien Loong in civil lawsuits, as well as acting for Singapore Press Holdings (SPH) in the National Kidney Foundation scandal.

In 1997, Singh was appointed to the first batch of Senior Counsels (SCs) in Singapore. He is the Chairman of the Singapore International Arbitration Centre.

Singh has been widely acknowledged as Singapore's top litigator and being without peer. Amongst the many honours and accolades he has received include winning the ALB South East Asia "Dispute Resolution Lawyer of the Year" award twice and being the first lawyer from the Asia-Pacific region to be inducted into the Benchmark Litigation Hall of Fame. Some others have called him "legendary" and "the best cross-examiner in Singapore".

== Early life and education ==
Singh's father, Amar Singh, was born in Quetta, British India (present-day Balochistan, Pakistan) and left for British Malaya as an economic migrant. His mother was born in Kuala Lumpur. Amar Singh moved first to Kuala Lumpur, and then moved again to early post-independence Singapore with his family, working as a travel agent. Davinder Singh grew up alongside two brothers and two sisters.

Singh completed his early education in the Lasallian Saint Michael's School, following in his two older brothers' footsteps. He went on to attend Saint Joseph's Institution, as was the normal progression of students at Saint Michael's School at that time. He was not focused on academics, and, to his parents' disappointment, entered the arts stream rather than the sciences stream after his Secondary 2 examinations. He nevertheless performed well in his GCE Ordinary Level examinations, enabling him entry into the newly-established National Junior College, then a prestigious government school in Singapore. Singh spent two years there, and then served his national service as an officer in the Singapore Army before attending the National University of Singapore, where he read law.

Singh's choice to read law was partially influenced by an event at Saint Joseph's Institution when his usual teacher was absent and his principal stood in as relief teacher. The principal set the students a test, and looking at Singh's paper, asked him whether his father was a lawyer. Singh answered no, but came away feeling that he must have impressed his principal very much to have earned such a remark. The idea stuck in Singh's head that he had a talent for argument. Singh's focus in law school was not academic. He described his view of university as "a great opportunity to experience varsity life", and treated the study of law as incidental to the experience.

In the first three years of his education, Singh did not give any thought to what he would do in practice. Internships and work placements were uncommon at that time. Singh, however, was attending law school on a scholarship from DBS Bank, which came with a job and a bond. One of the requirements of the scholarship was that he spent three weeks a year at the bank, which he did. In his third year, he decided that he did not enjoy the prospect of being in-house counsel at a bank. That year, he attempted the Philip C. Jessup International Law Moot Court Competition in Washington, D.C., with three friends, Steven Chong, V. K. Rajah and Jimmy Yim. The team became the first from the National University of Singapore to win the prestigious moot, and Singh was named the Best Oralist in the Championship round. Singh decided that he enjoyed advocacy, and charted his career accordingly.

== Legal career ==
=== Pupillage ===
By the end of law school, Singh had decided not to join DBS Bank as in-house counsel. He applied to various law firms for pupillage, but received rejections in various forms. Some of the reasons given included that he spoke no languages other than English. One firm informed him that DBS Bank was one of its clients and the firm did not want to displease them by offering a job to one of their bond-breakers. Singh ended up without alternatives, and approached one of his lecturers in banking law with his difficulty. This lecturer recommended him to Harry Elias, then a lawyer at Drew & Napier, who offered Singh pupillage at his firm.

Singh described pupillage as life-changing. He entered Drew & Napier in May 1983, one of a number of pupils. Through a stroke of administrative luck, he was assigned pupil to Joseph Grimberg, then a well-known advocate in Singapore, whose clients included Singapore's prime minister Lee Kuan Yew. Singh described his experience under Grimberg is transformational, filling him with the inspiration he had earlier lacked. He decided then that he wanted to be "the next Joe Grimberg".

Singh learnt through experience. Since Grimberg was a senior lawyer, he tended to be assigned complex cases. Singh also absorbed Grimberg's intellectual process and work ethic. When pupillage was complete, Grimberg retained Singh, making Singh his legal assistant and paying off Singh's bond. Singh, in turn, strived to make himself indispensable to Grimberg. Singh's early work was on a breadth of commercial disputes, which Grimberg focused on.

Singh was the defence counsel for former Minister S. Iswaran for his corruption charges, founder of Hin Leong, Lim Oon Kuin for cheating and forgery and Hyflux founder Olivia Lum for violations of Singapore's Securities and Futures Act. He also represented Ministers K. Shanmugam and Tan See Leng in their defamation suits against Terry Xu and Bloomberg.

=== Notable cases ===
==== 2005 National Kidney Foundation scandal ====
In 2005, Singh represented Singapore Press Holdings in a lawsuit brought against them by T. T. Durai, Chief Executive Officer of the National Kidney Foundation (NKF), for defamation in relation to an article written by one of their correspondents. Durai dropped the case on the second day of the trial.

==== 2014–15 Roy Ngerng defamation case ====
In 2014, Singh and three other lawyers from Drew & Napier represented Prime Minister Lee Hsien Loong in a defamation lawsuit against blogger Roy Ngerng, who was represented by M Ravi and Eugene Thuraisingam. On 7 November 2014, Justice Lee Seiu Kin found Ngerng to have defamed Lee Hsien Loong in an online article whose contents suggested that the Prime Minister was guilty of criminal misappropriation. In July 2015, during a hearing to assess the amount of damages he has to pay Lee Hsien Loong, Ngerng broke down in tears while he was being cross-examined by Singh. On 17 December 2015, the judge handed down a judgement ordering Ngerng to pay S$100,000 in general damages and S$50,000 in aggravated damages. Ngerng, through his lawyer Eugene Thuraisingam, proposed to pay the S$150,000 in instalments – a request granted by Lee Hsien Loong on the condition that Ngerng paid the S$30,000 in hearing costs immediately, i.e., by 16 March 2016. Ngerng is expected to repay $100 a month from 1 April 2016 onwards over five years until 1 April 2021 when instalments are increased to S$1,000 until the full sum has been paid by the year 2033.

== Political career ==
In 1987, Home Affairs Minister S. Jayakumar, who had taught Singh constitutional law when he was a lecturer at the National University of Singapore, asked Singh to consider becoming a Member of Parliament. Singh, at that time, had a busy practice and was focused on his career, and was not sure that he was prepared for the commitment. However, Singh decided to accept, for a number of reasons. Singh's parents were ardent admirers of Singapore's first prime minister, Lee Kuan Yew, and Singh knew that joining the PAP would make his mother and late father proud. Singh was himself an admirer of Lee. Once, when asked by Grimberg what he wanted to be in fifteen years, Singh replied, "I'd like to be Lee Kuan Yew's lawyer", to which Grimberg replied, "You will be." He also felt that contributing as a parliamentarian was a rare opportunity would add a valuable dimension to life.

Singh ran in the 1988 Singaporean general election and won in an walkover, and from 1988 to 2006, Singh served as a Member of Parliament for Bishan-Toa Payoh Group Representation Constituency. Singh was Singapore's first Sikh parliamentarian.

== Personal life ==
Singh has two sons, who work in his Chambers.

== Honours ==
- Sultan Hassanal Bolkiah Medal First Class (PHBS; 15 July 2010)

== Notes ==
Parliament of Singapore
New constituency	Member of Parliament for Toa Payoh GRC; 1988 – 1997; Served alongside: (1988 – 1991): Wong Kan Seng and Ho Tat Kin (1991 – 1997): S. Dhanabalan, Ho Tat Kin and Ong Teng Cheong	Constituency abolished
New constituency	Member of Parliament for Bishan–Toa Payoh GRC; 1997 – 2006; Served alongside: (1997 – 2001): Wong Kan Seng, Ibrahim Othman, Leong Horn Kee and Ho Tat Kin (2001 – 2006): Wong Kan Seng, Zainudin Nordin, Leong Horn Kee and Ng Eng Hen	Succeeded by Wong Kan Seng; Zainudin Nordin; Hri Kumar Nair; Ng Eng Hen; Josephine Teo
