= P. Selvadurai =

Singaporean former politician (1933–2024)

- பி. செல்வதுரை
- Selvadurai in 1968

Member of the Singapore Parliament for Bukit Panjang Constituency
- In office 1967 – 16 August 1972
- Preceded by: Ong Lian Teng
- Succeeded by: Lee Yiok Seng

Member of the Singapore Parliament for Kuo Chuan Constituency
- In office 12 October 1972 – 4 December 1984
- Preceded by: constituency established
- Succeeded by: Wong Kan Seng

Personal details
- Born: Pathmanaban Selvadurai; 9 June 1933 Singapore, Straits Settlements
- Died: 18 July 2024 (aged 91) Singapore
- Spouse: Vimala

Pathmanaban Selvadurai (Note: Tamil: பத்மநாபன் செல்வதுரை, romanized: Patmanāpaṉ Celvaturai) (9 June 1933 – 18 July 2024) was a Singaporean politician and lawyer. A former member of the People's Action Party (PAP), he served as the Member of Parliament (MP) representing Bukit Panjang Constituency from 1967 to 1972 and the MP representing Kuo Chuan Constituency from 1972 to 1984. Selvadurai died on 18 July 2024, at the age of 92.

== Early life and education ==
Selvadurai was born in the Straits Settlements (present-day Singapore) on 9 June 1933 to Ceylon Tamils. He studied at Monk's Hill Primary School and Raffles Institution. He also went to London University College and Middle Temple where he became a barrister-at-law. Before joining politics, he was a member of the governing board of NTUC's Research Unit and a referee of the Industrial Arbitration Court.

== Career ==
=== Political career ===
Selvadurai made his political debut at the 1967 by-elections, where he contested for Member of Parliament (MP) representing Bukit Panjang Constituency, being elected unopposed. At the 1968 general election, he contested for MP representing Bukit Panjang again, being elected unopposed again. That same year, Selvadurai was a part of a 4-member team that went to North Korea. In 1969, he opened Chestnut Drive Secondary School (now Greenridge Secondary School).

In the 1972 general election, Selvadurai contested for MP of Kuo Chuan Constituency instead of Bukit Panjang as then-new candidate Lee Yiok Seng was believed by the PAP to "muster support of the Chinese and Malays" due to his multilingualism. Selvadurai went against P. Manokaran of Barisan Sosialis (BS) and was elected with 73.69% of the vote. In 1974, Selvadurai and Chiang Hai Ding presented a private bill, the Roman Catholic Archbishop Bill, which was passed the following year.

In the 1976 general election, he contested for MP of Kuo Chuan Constituency again, against Ng Ah Chue of BS, and was elected with 74.42% of the vote. The following election, he contested for MP of Kuo Chuan Constituency again, against Sim Chit Giak of BS, and was elected with 75.92% of the vote. He announced his retirement from politics in 1984.

=== Law career ===
In 2008, Selvadurai joined Tan Rajah & Cheah as a consultant. He had previously served at Rodyk & Davidson as a partner and later consultant for over 40 years. He also served as a member of the Singapore National Eye Centre, the Singapore Arts School, and as president of the Indian Fine Arts Society.
