= Cai Yinzhou =

Singaporean politician

The Honourable Cai Yinzhou
- 蔡引舟
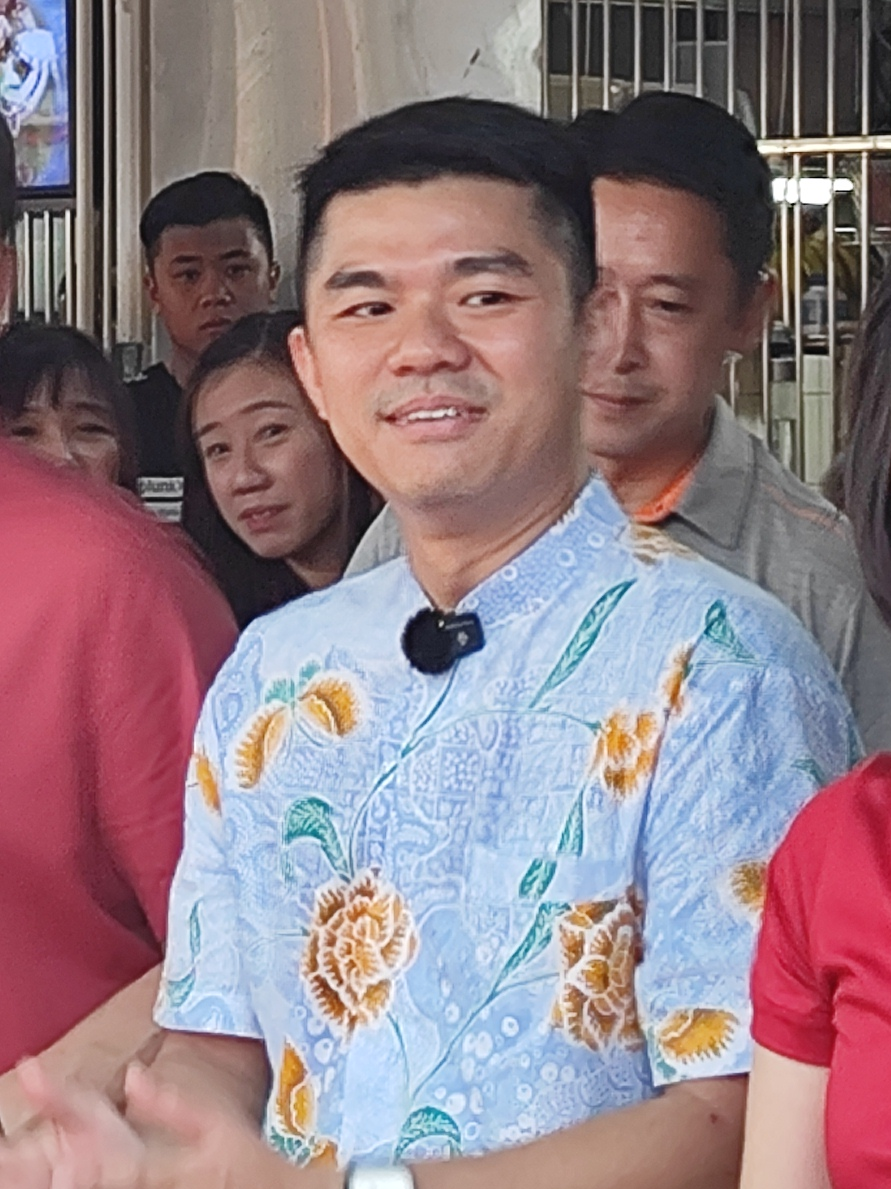
- Cai in 2025

Member of the Singapore Parliament for Bishan–Toa Payoh GRC
- Incumbent
- Assumed office 3 May 2025
- Preceded by: PAP held
- Majority: 44,511 (50.36%)

Personal details
- Born: 16 October 1990 (age 36)
- Party: People's Action Party

Cai Yinzhou (Note: Chinese: 蔡引舟; pinyin: Cài Yǐnzhōu) (born 16 October 1990) is a Singaporean politician who was elected to the Parliament of Singapore in the 2025 general election. A member of the governing People's Action Party (PAP), he has been the Member of Parliament (MP), as part of a PAP team, representing Bishan–Toa Payoh Group Representation Constituency (GRC) from 2025.

== Career ==
Prior to entering politics, Cai was a social entrepreneur and he was named as the 2020 Strait Times Singaporean of the Year.

=== Political career ===
In the 2025 general election, Cai was fielded in Bishan–Toa Payoh GRC led by Anchor Minister Chee Hong Tat to replace retiring Defence Minister Ng Eng Hen. His team would win with 75% of the vote. Cai has served as the Vice-Chairman of the Bishan-Toa Payoh Town Council (BTPTC) since 2025.

== Notes ==
Parliament of Singapore
Preceded by Chong Kee Hiong; Chee Hong Tat; Ng Eng Hen; Saktiandi Supaat	Member of Parliament for Bishan–Toa Payoh GRC; 2025 – present Served alongside: (2025 – present): Chee Hong Tat, Elysa Chen, Saktiandi Supaat	Incumbent
