= Wong Kan Seng =

Singaporean politician

Wong Kan Seng PPA(P)
- 黄根成
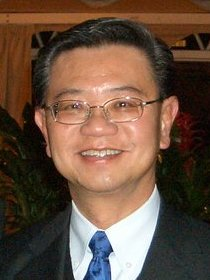
- Wong in 2006

5th Deputy Prime Minister of Singapore
- In office 1 September 2005 – 20 May 2011 Serving with S. Jayakumar (2004–2009) and Teo Chee Hean (2009–2019)
- Prime Minister: Lee Hsien Loong
- Preceded by: Tony Tan; Lee Hsien Loong
- Succeeded by: Tharman Shanmugaratnam; Teo Chee Hean

Coordinating Minister for National Security
- In office 1 November 2010 – 20 May 2011
- Prime Minister: Lee Hsien Loong
- Preceded by: S. Jayakumar
- Succeeded by: Teo Chee Hean

Minister for Home Affairs
- In office 2 January 1994 – 31 October 2010
- Prime Minister: Goh Chok Tong; Lee Hsien Loong
- Second Minister: K. Shanmugam (from 2008)
- Preceded by: S. Jayakumar
- Succeeded by: K. Shanmugam

Minister for Foreign Affairs
- In office 13 September 1988 – 1 January 1994
- Prime Minister: Lee Kuan Yew; Goh Chok Tong
- Preceded by: S. Dhanabalan
- Succeeded by: S. Jayakumar

Leader of the House
- In office 25 February 1987 – 31 March 2007
- Prime Minister: Lee Kuan Yew; Goh Chok Tong; Lee Hsien Loong
- Preceded by: S. Dhanabalan
- Succeeded by: Mah Bow Tan

Minister for Community Development
- In office 31 December 1986 – 29 June 1991; Acting: 18 February – 31 December 1986
- Prime Minister: Lee Kuan Yew; Goh Chok Tong
- Preceded by: S. Dhanabalan
- Succeeded by: Seet Ai Mee

Member of Parliament for Bishan–Toa Payoh GRC
- In office 23 December 1996 – 25 August 2015
- Preceded by: Constituency established
- Succeeded by: PAP held
- Majority: 1996: N/A (walkover); 2001: N/A (walkover); 2006: N/A (walkover); 2011: 12,180 (13.86%)

Member of Parliament for Thomson GRC
- In office 21 August 1991 – 16 December 1996
- Preceded by: Constituency established
- Succeeded by: Constituency abolished
- Majority: N/A (walkover)

Member of Parliament for Toa Payoh GRC
- In office 3 September 1988 – 14 August 1991
- Preceded by: Constituency established
- Succeeded by: PAP held
- Majority: N/A (walkover)

Member of Parliament for Kuo Chuan Constituency
- In office 22 December 1984 – 17 August 1988
- Preceded by: P. Selvadurai (PAP)
- Succeeded by: Constituency abolished
- Majority: 5,033 (29.10%)

Personal details
- Born: Wong Kan Seng; 8 September 1946 (age 80) Colony of Singapore
- Other political affiliations: People's Action Party (1984–2015)
- Spouse: Ruth Lee Hong Geok
- Children: 2
- Education: University of Singapore (BA); London Business School (MSc)
- Occupation: Business executive; politician; civil servant; teacher

Wong Kan Seng (born 8 September 1946; Chinese: 黄根成; Jyutping: Wong^{4} Gan^{1} Sing^{4}; pinyin: Huáng Gēnchéng) is a Singaporean former politician who served from 2005 to 2011 as the fifth Deputy Prime Minister of Singapore. He has been the chairman of UOB Bank (UOB) since 2017 and of CapitaLand Group since 2021.

As a Member of Parliament, Wong represented Kuo Chuan Single Member Constituency between 1984 and 1988, the Bishan East division of Thomson Group Representation Constituency between 1991 and 1997, and Bishan-Toa Payoh Group Representation Constituency between 1997 and 2015.

As a member of Singapore's governing People's Action Party (PAP), Wong served in the Singapore Cabinet as Minister for Community Development between 1987 and 1991, Leader of the House between 1987 and 2007, Minister for Foreign Affairs between 1988 and 1994, Minister for Home Affairs between 1994 and 2010, Deputy Prime Minister between 2005 and 2011, and Coordinating Minister for National Security between 2010 and 2011. He served as a Member of Parliament on the backbenches from 2011 until 2015.

== Education ==
Wong attended Rangoon Road Primary School, Outram Secondary School, and the Adult Education Board (now the Institute of Technical Education), before graduating in 1970 from the University of Singapore (now the National University of Singapore) with a Bachelor of Arts degree with honours in both History and English.

In 1979 Wong completed a Master of Science degree in business studies at the London Business School under a postgraduate scholarship conferred by the Singapore Government when he was a civil servant.

== Career ==
Prior to entering politics, Wong worked in the Ministry of Labour and Ministry of Defence as a civil servant before joining Hewlett Packard in 1981 as a personnel manager. He left in 1985 to take up his career in politics.

Wong made his political debut in the 1984 Singaporean general election as a candidate for PAP, winning the seat of Kuo Chuan Constituency. In 1988, Kuo Chuan Constituency was merged into Toa Payoh GRC and Wong was elected MP for the GRC unopposed. He stood in Thomson GRC during the 1991 general election before switching to Bishan-Toa Payoh GRC in the 1997 general election. He served as Leader of the House between 1991 and 2007.

=== Cabinet appointments ===
==== Minister for Community Development ====
Wong was appointed Acting Minister for Community Development in 1986, and was made a full member of the cabinet as Minister for Community Development by Prime Minister Lee Kuan Yew in 1987. He was appointed Minister for Foreign Affairs in 1988.

Wong was vocal in defending any criticisms of the PAP as being authoritarian, or that the political process was undemocratic with an advantage given to the governing party. He often described the opposition as being disorganised, weak, and driven by self-interest:

"The public has no sympathy for them. Neither do I. Why should I? I mean, they mess it up."

On opposition politician J. B. Jeyaretnam's proposal to establish an independent elections commission, Wong remarked, "It is absurd. I think we cannot be more democratic than we are now. We even allow a loser to be in Parliament and make speeches attacking the government. Where could you find such a democracy in other countries?"

During the 1993 World Conference on Human Rights Wong argued that democracy was interpreted differently in Singapore. He claimed that its citizens "do not agree that pornography is an acceptable manifestation of free expression or that homosexual relationships are just a matter of lifestyle choice". Wong also believed that excessive emphasis on individual rights over the rights of the community would retard progress.

==== Minister for Home Affairs ====
In 1994 Wong became Minister for Home Affairs, in charge of overseeing emergency planning, dealing with internal threats such as cults and terrorists, law and order, and rooting out criminals and illegal immigrants.

He was also responsible for co-ordinating the nationwide inter-ministerial effort to counter the SARS epidemic. Measures taken to contain the virus included mandatory home quarantine measures; health screening at immigration checkpoints, schools and hospitals; and public education programs. On 31 May 2003 Singapore was taken off the World Health Organization's list of SARS-affected countries.

==== Mas Selamat Kastari's escape ====
Alleged Jemaah Islamiyah leader Mas Selamat Kastari escaped from Whitley Road Detention Centre on 27 February 2008, resulting in the largest manhunt in Singapore history. Wong revealed that Mas Selamat had escaped when he was taken to the toilet before a meeting at the detention centre's family visit room, and expressed his regret in Parliament the next day:

"This should never have happened. I am sorry that it has."

Wong was criticised because news of Mas Selamat's escape was not disseminated to the public until four hours after its occurrence, and given the severity of the security lapse there were calls for Wong to step down. Mas Selamat was eventually recaptured by Malaysian authorities in Johor Bahru, Malaysia on 1 April 2009, over a year after his escape.

==== Other cabinet appointments ====
On 1 September 2005 Wong was appointed Deputy Prime Minister by Prime Minister Lee Hsien Loong, following the retirement of Tony Tan. On 1 November 2010 he was appointed Coordinating Minister for National Security and relinquished his Minister for Home Affairs portfolio.

Wong retired from the cabinet following the 2011 general election. He remained a Member of Parliament on the backbenches as well as the special adviser for economic cooperation to Prime Minister Lee Hsien Loong until 11 September 2015, when he finally retired from politics after 31 years in office.

== Professional career ==
After stepping down from the cabinet Wong returned to the private sector, and in 2011 was appointed chairman of Singbridge International, a Temasek Holdings unit dealing with the Sino-Singapore Guangzhou Knowledge City.

He was appointed as an independent non-executive director on the board of directors of the United Overseas Bank (UOB) in 2017, and was subsequently appointed chairman in 2018. At UOB he also held the positions of chairman of the Executive Committee and Member of the Board Risk Management Committee, Nominating Committee, and Remuneration and Human Capital Committee.

Wong was appointed as an independent director of CapitaLand in July 2017, and was serving as CapitaLand Group chairman by 2021.

== Personal life ==
Wong is of Cantonese descent. He is married to Ruth Lee Hong Geok and they have two children.

Political offices
Preceded by Tony Tan	Deputy Prime Minister of Singapore; 2005 - 2011	Succeeded by Tharman Shanmugaratnam
Preceded by S. Jayakumar	Co-ordinating Minister for National Security; 2010-2011	Succeeded by Teo Chee Hean
Preceded by S. Jayakumar	Minister for Home Affairs; 1994-2010	Succeeded by K. Shanmugam
Preceded by S. Dhanabalan	Minister for Foreign Affairs; 1988-1994	Succeeded by S. Jayakumar
Preceded by S. Dhanabalan	Minister for Community Development; 18 February 1986 – 31 August 1991	Succeeded by Seet Ai Mei
Parliament of Singapore
Preceded by P. Selvadurai	Member of Parliament for Kuo Chuan Constituency; 1984 – 1988	Constituency abolished
New constituency	Member of Parliament for Toa Payoh GRC; 1988 – 1991; Served alongside: Davinder Singh and Ho Tat Kin	Succeeded by S. Dhanabalan; Ho Tat Kin; Ong Teng Cheong
New constituency	Member of Parliament for Thomson GRC; 1991 – 1997; Served alongside: Lau Teik Soon, Ibrahim Othman and Leong Horn Kee	Constituency abolished
New constituency	Member of Parliament for Bishan–Toa Payoh GRC; 1997 – 2015; Served alongside: (1997 – 2001): Davinder Singh, Ibrahim Othman, Leong Horn Kee and Ho Tat Kin (2001 – 2006): Davinder Singh, Zainudin Nordin, Leong Horn Kee and Ng Eng Hen (2006 – 2011): Zainudin Nordin, Hri Kumar Nair, Ng Eng Hen and Josephine Teo (2011 – 2015): Josephine Teo, Hri Kumar Nair, Ng Eng Hen and Zainudin Nordin	Succeeded by Chong Kee Hiong; Josephine Teo; Chee Hong Tat; Ng Eng Hen; Saktiandi Supaat
