= Chee Hong Tat =

Singaporean politician (born 1973)

The Honourable Chee Hong Tat
- 徐芳达
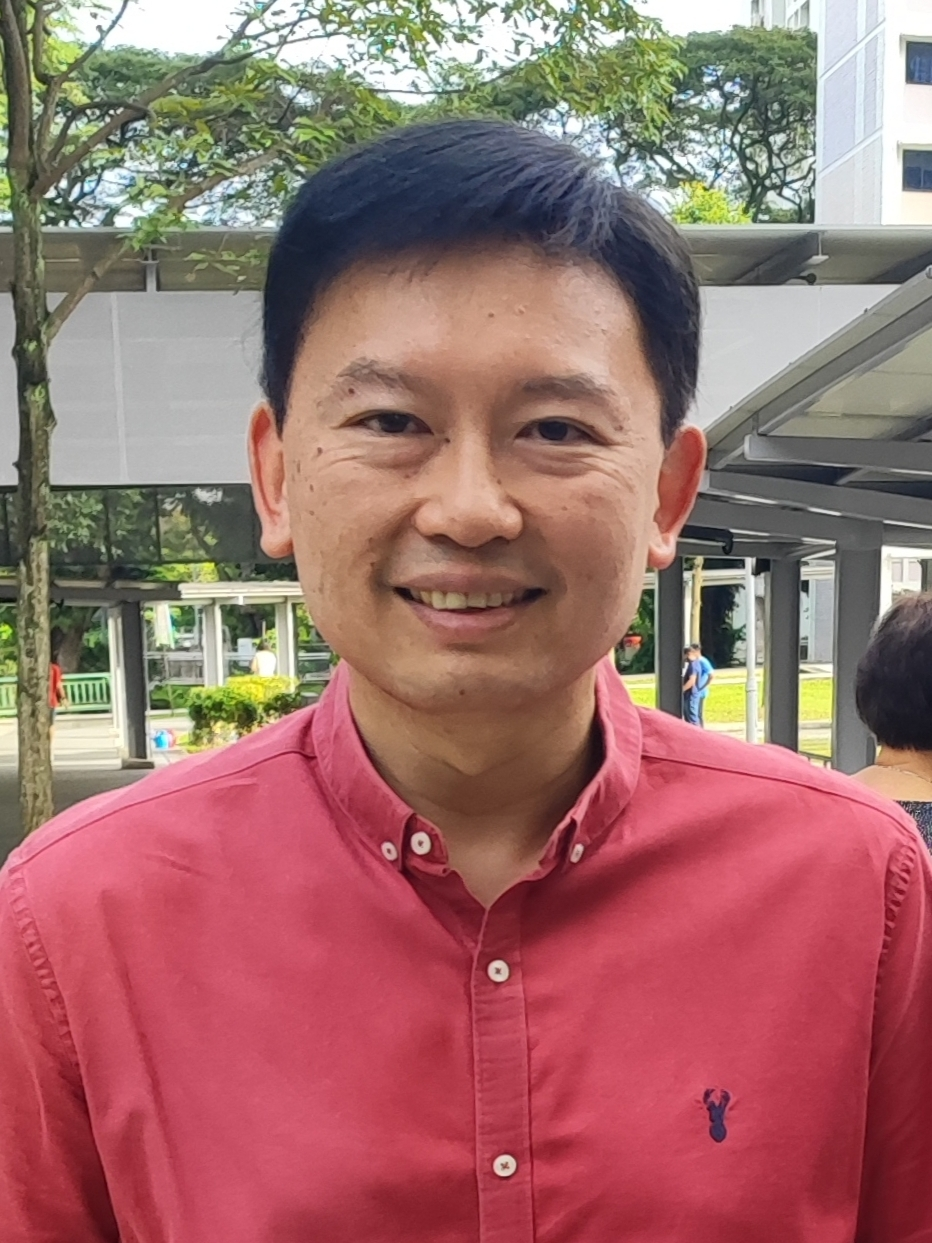
- Chee in 2025

Minister for National Development
- Incumbent
- Assumed office 23 May 2025
- Prime Minister: Lawrence Wong
- Second Minister: Indranee Rajah
- Preceded by: Desmond Lee

Assistant Treasurer of the People's Action Party
- Incumbent
- Assumed office 29 May 2025
- Prime Minister: Lawrence Wong
- Preceded by: Ong Ye Kung

Minister for Transport
- In office 18 January 2024 – 23 May 2025; Acting: 12 July 2023 – 17 January 2024
- Prime Minister: Lee Hsien Loong; Lawrence Wong
- Preceded by: S. Iswaran
- Succeeded by: Jeffrey Siow (Acting)

Second Minister for Finance
- In office 18 January 2024 – 23 May 2025 Serving with Indranee Rajah
- Prime Minister: Lee Hsien Loong; Lawrence Wong
- Minister: Lawrence Wong
- Preceded by: Lawrence Wong (2021)
- Succeeded by: Indranee Rajah

Deputy Secretary-General of the National Trades Union Congress
- In office 15 May 2021 – 12 June 2022
- Secretary-General: Ng Chee Meng
- Preceded by: Koh Poh Koon
- Succeeded by: Desmond Tan

Member of Parliament for Bishan–Toa Payoh GRC
- Incumbent
- Assumed office 11 September 2015
- Preceded by: PAP held
- Majority: 2015: 55,465 (47.18%); 2020: 32,287 (34.46%); 2025: 44,511 (50.36%)

Personal details
- Born: 4 November 1973 Singapore
- Party: People's Action Party
- Children: 4
- Education: University of California, Berkeley (BS, BA); University of Adelaide (MBA)

Chee Hong Tat (Note: Chinese: 徐芳达; Pe̍h-ōe-jī: Chhî Hong-ta̍t; pinyin: Xú Fāngdá) (born 4 November 1973) is a Singaporean politician and former civil servant who has been the Assistant Treasurer of the People's Action Party (PAP) since 2025 and has been Minister for National Development in 2025. A member of the governing PAP, he has been the Member of Parliament (MP) representing the Toa Payoh West–Thomson division of Bishan–Toa Payoh Group Representation Constituency (GRC) since 2015.

Prior to entering politics, Chee worked at the Ministry of Home Affairs (MHA), the Ministry of Finance (MOF), the Ministry of Transport (MOT), and the Ministry of Education (MOE), and was principal private secretary to Minister Mentor Lee Kuan Yew from 2008 to 2011. He subsequently was chief executive officer of the Energy Market Authority (EMA) between 2011 and 2015.

Chee made his political debut in the 2015 general election as part of a five-member PAP team contesting in Bishan–Toa Payoh GRC which won 73.59% of the vote. Chee was elected as the Member of Parliament representing the Toa Payoh West–Balestier division of Bishan–Toa Payoh GRC. Since then, he has retained his parliamentary seat in the 2020 general election and had been appointed Minister of State and subsequently Senior Minister of State. At the 2025 general election, Chee led PAP's team in Bishan–Toa Payoh GRC, as its new anchor minister.

== Education ==
Chee was educated at The Chinese High School and Raffles Junior College before graduating from the University of California, Berkeley in 1996 with a Bachelor of Science with highest honours degree in electrical engineering and computer science, as well as a Bachelor of Arts with highest honours degree in economics, under the Overseas Merit Scholarship awarded by the Singapore Government.

He subsequently went on to complete a Master of Business Administration degree at the University of Adelaide in 2006, and was awarded the Newmont Australia Prize for the Most Outstanding MBA Graduate.

== Public service career ==
=== Pre-politics ===
Chee joined the Singapore Administrative Service in 1998 and worked at various Ministries, including Home Affairs, Finance, Transport and Education.

From 9 May 2011 to 1 April 2014, Chee was the chief executive officer of the Energy Market Authority. He also was Second Permanent Secretary at the Ministry of Trade and Industry from 1 December 2014 to 11 August 2015.

=== Post-politics ===
On 2 May 2024, Chee was appointed as a director at the Monetary Authority of Singapore (MAS) Board of Directors with his term lasting from 1 June to 31 May 2027. On 29 July, it was announced that Chee would be appointed as deputy chairman of the MAS board of directors, taking over the role from Gan Kim Yong, who went on to become chairman. Chee's term as deputy chairman would last from 23 August in the same term as his tenure as director on the board of directors to 31 May 2027.

=== Response to advocacy of Chinese "dialects" ===
Before his political debut at the 2015 general election, Chee was personally close to Lee Kuan Yew in the latter's later years, having been his Principal Private Secretary during Lee's tenure as Minister Mentor from 2008 to 2011. A proponent of the Speak Mandarin Campaign, he attracted public attention during this period by writing a letter to The Straits Times forum on 7 March 2009. The letter was written in response to an appeal by Nanyang Technological University (NTU)'s Division of Linguistics and Multilingual Studies, then headed by Ng Bee Chin, which called for the reinstatement of non-Mandarin Chinese varieties.

In the letter, Chee wrote that "it would be stupid for any Singapore agency or NTU to advocate the learning of dialects, which must be at the expense of English and Mandarin". Lee later mentioned Chee's letter in his book My Lifelong Challenge: Singapore's Bilingual Journey and said that to return to the use of non-Mandarin Chinese varieties was a "daft call". During Lee's state funeral in 2015, Chee was one of the eight pallbearers.

== Political career ==
Chee resigned from the Singapore Administrative Service on 11 August 2015 to run for election in the 2015 general election as part of a five-member People's Action Party (PAP) team contesting in Bishan–Toa Payoh GRC after Wong Kan Seng, Hri Kumar and Zainudin Nordin stepped down from their respective wards and politics. Two years before that, he had been attending grassroots events in Bishan–Toa Payoh and Marine Parade GRCs. On 1 September 2015 (Nomination Day), Chee's fist-clenching and chest-thumping action in response to hecklers shocked a few observers and amused others. When he was asked about that, Chee replied, "I'm new to this, so there's much for me to learn. I'll certainly try to improve." On Polling Day, the PAP team won with 73.59% of the vote against the Singapore People's Party. Chee was elected Member of Parliament representing the Bishan–Toa Payoh GRC.

On 1 October 2015, Chee was appointed Minister of State at the Ministries of Health and Communications and Information.

Chee was promoted to Senior Minister of State on 1 May 2017 and was at the Ministries of Communications and Information and Health from May 2017 to April 2018. On 9 November 2017, he alleged in a Facebook post that Leon Perera, a Non-constituency Member of Parliament, had made false accusations about Mediacorp making partisan edits on the video of a parliamentary debate on Presidential Elections (Amendment) Bill in February 2017. In response, Perera refuted Chee's allegation and stated that his questions were about the ownership of the copyright to parliamentary video footage and why parliamentary video live feed cannot be made publicly available, as is the case in many other countries. Perera later apologised in Parliament.

On 10 March 2018, Chee was one of the PAP Members of Parliament who responded to Workers' Party Member of Parliament Sylvia Lim over her remark that the government had intended to raise the goods and services tax in the current term but backtracked due to negative public reaction. He chided the Workers' Party for using this issue to discredit the PAP government, saying that it was an attack on its integrity and not responding as strongly as they did would imply that the government is dishonest. Lim acknowledged that she "may have been wrong".

On 24 April 2018, Chee was redesignated as Senior Minister of State at the Ministries of Trade and Industry and Education.

In the 2020 general election, Chee contested in Bishan–Toa Payoh GRC as part of a four-member PAP team and they won with 67.26% of the vote against the Singapore People's Party. He thus retained his parliamentary seat of Bishan–Toa Payoh GRC. He is also a member of the Bishan–Toa Payoh Town Council and an advisor to the Bishan–Toa Payoh grassroots organisations. On 27 July 2020, he was appointed Senior Minister of State at the Ministries of Transport and Foreign Affairs. Following a Cabinet reshuffle, on 15 May 2021, his portfolio as Senior Minister of State for Foreign Affairs was dropped, but he remained Senior Minister of State for Transport as he was shifted to the Labour Movement following a request by PM Lee to send him in return for Koh Poh Koon. Chee was however appointed Senior Minister of State at the Ministry of Finance on 13 June 2022, he was replaced by Desmond Tan at NTUC.

During the 2025 general election, incumbent MPs Ng Eng Hen and Chong Kee Hiong announced their retirement from politics. Chee became the new leader of the PAP team, Saktiandi Supaat and two new candidates Cai Yinzhou and Elysa Chen, to contest the GRC against a SPP team led by Steve Chia. The PAP team won the contest with 75 percent of the vote.

On 29 May, Chee was promoted to Assistant Treasurer in the Party's Central Executive Committee, replacing Ong Ye Kung who took over as Party Treasurer from K. Shanmugam.

=== Minister of Transport (2023–2025) ===
On 12 July 2023, Chee was appointed Acting Minister for Transport after S. Iswaran was put on a leave of absence while he is under an investigation launched by the Corrupt Practices Investigation Bureau (CPIB).

On 18 January 2024, Chee was promoted as full Minister for Transport after resignation of S. Iswaran after the latter was charged for 27 counts related to bribery and corruption. He was also appointed Second Minister for Finance.

=== Minister for National Development (2025–present) ===
On 21 May 2025, Prime Minister Lawrence Wong announced that Chee would be taking over as Minister for National Development from Desmond Lee who moved to the Education Ministry and relinquished his Transport Portfolio to newly-elected MP Jeffrey Siow. He also stepped down from Second Minister for Finance. Chee assumed office as Minister for National Development on 23 May.

== Personal life ==
Chee is married with four children. He is Chinese Singaporean of partial Hokkien descent through both his paternal and maternal grandfathers.

== Incident ==
On 6 May 2025, three days after the general election, it was revealed that Chee, alongside fellow ministers Ong Ye Kung and Ng Chee Meng, had dined with convicted money launderer Su Haijin in a photo. This led to questions from online Singaporeans and news outlets about how they met Su, and whether there was a relationship between Su and the ministers. Chee and Ong said that they were invited by a friend and Su's presence was a coincidence, and did not interact with Su after learning about his conviction.

== Notes ==
Political offices
Preceded by S. Iswaran	Minister for Transport; 2024–2025	Succeeded by Jeffrey Siow (Acting)
Preceded by Desmond Lee	Minister for National Development; 2025–present	Incumbent
Parliament of Singapore
Preceded by Wong Kan Seng; Josephine Teo; Hri Kumar Nair; Ng Eng Hen; Zainudin Nordin	Member of Parliament for Bishan–Toa Payoh GRC; 2015–present Served alongside: (2015–2020): Chong Kee Hiong, Josephine Teo, Ng Eng Hen, Saktiandi Supaat (2020–2025): Chong Kee Hiong, Ng Eng Hen, Saktiandi Supaat (2025–present): Cai Yinzhou, Elysa Chen, Saktiandi Supaat	Incumbent
