= PAP Community Foundation =

Singaporean charitable foundation

- Founded: 1986; 40 years ago
- Founder: People's Action Party
- Type: Foundation
- Registration no.: 198601011Z
- Purpose: Kindergarten, eldercare, welfare, community services
- Location: Block 57B New Upper Changi Road #01-1402 PCF Building Singapore 463057
- Key people: Josephine Teo, Chair; Victor Bay, CEO; Chong Kee Hiong, Treasurer
- Website: www.pcf.org.sg

PAP Community Foundation (abbreviation: PCF) is a charitable foundation in Singapore founded by the governing People's Action Party (PAP). Its aim includes the social and charitable causes between Singaporeans and the PAP, especially in preschool education, eldercare and community services. It also includes offering financial assistance and promoting welfare of its citizens. Since 1986, the foundation has built many kindergartens and centres islandwide providing childcare, student care and aged care services. Centres are also built close to public housing estates, such that the centres are all within a close proximity. The incumbent Chair is Josephine Teo.

== History ==
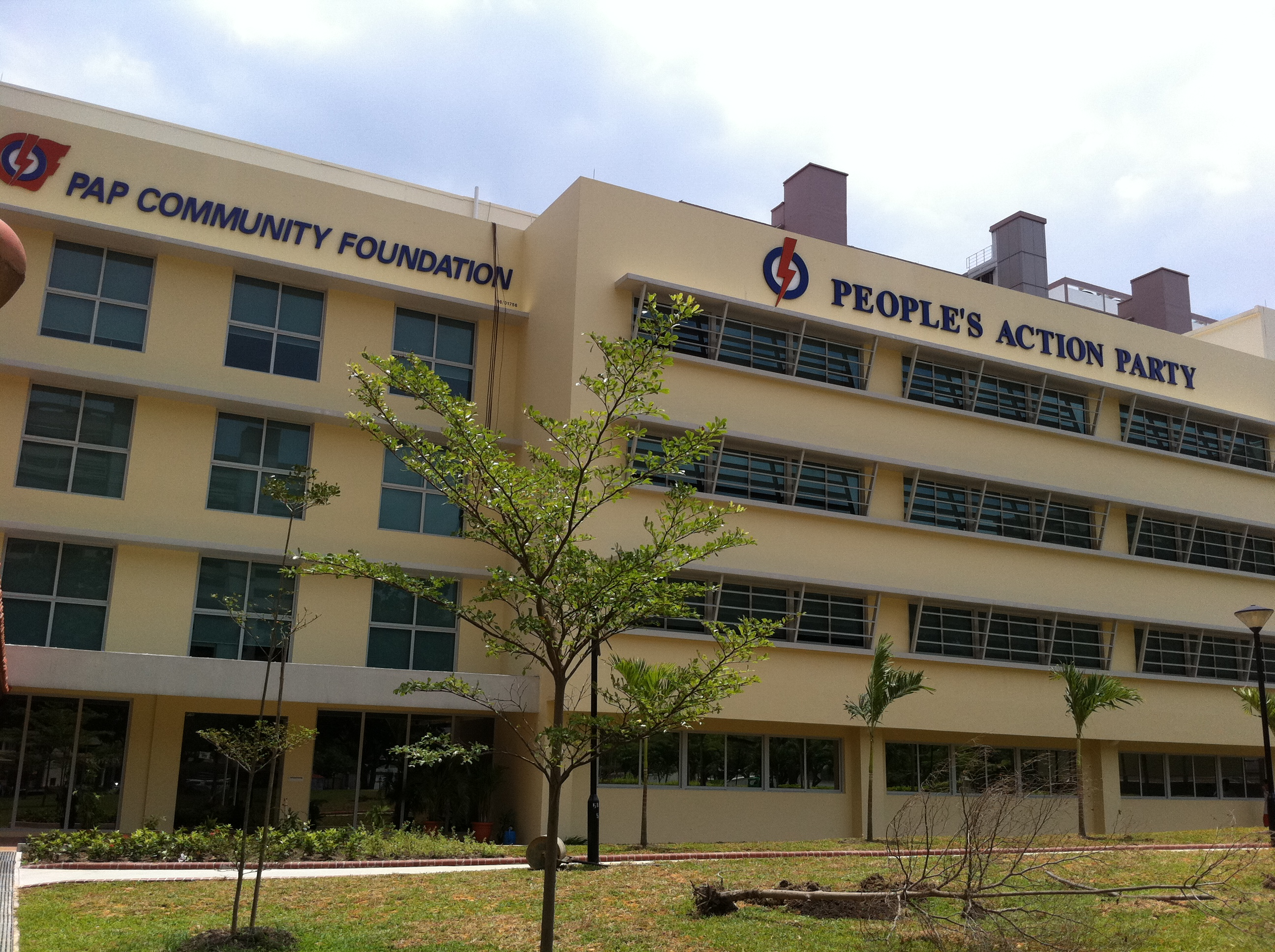
People's Action Party Headquarters in New Upper Changi Road, Singapore

The PAP Community Foundation was founded as a charity organization with roots in Singaporean origins and society, the first chairperson of the board was former Prime Minister Goh Chok Tong between 1986 and 1990, followed by former President of Singapore Tony Tan and Coordinating Minister for National Security Teo Chee Hean between 1990 and 1999, and 1999 and 2011 respectively. The foundation is headquartered in Upper Changi Road, Singapore. The mission statement state of the foundation is to "enhance the well-being of the community by providing quality educational services at affordable cost, as well as through welfare and community services". The organisation suggests a vision which will "nurture a multi-racial, fair, just and inclusive society by providing educational, welfare and community services." The group has grown to become a heartland centre, with approximately tens of thousands of children put through its centres in 87 locations.

Four notable purposes of PCF are Kindergarten, Child Care, Education, and Charity, with senior care proposed as the next series of implementations. The first senior care centre was opened in 2016 in Simei, and in 2023, PCF operates a total of 7 senior care centres.

The official website for the organization states that the organization started in the 1960s to help prepare children for entry into primary schools. Classes were conducted in any space available – from 'wayang' stages to shop-houses. In addition to the benefits of having a pre-school education for children, the People's Action Party also viewed it as a social outreach programme to gain the support of parents From then till 1986, these kindergartens were run by individual party branches in their respective constituency.

In 2012, the majority of pre-schoolers in Singapore attend one of the PCF-run kindergartens, and the PCF commands about half of Singapore's pre-school market. In 2022, there are more than 40,000 children enrolled in about 360 of PCF's preschools islandwide. The foundation is also notable in offering a variety of bursaries and scholarships.

In 2021, PCF was recognised as the best workplace in Asia according to Great Place to Work given good workplace and employee support programmes despite the COVID-19 pandemic.

Lawrence Wong was the council chairman from 2016 to 2022. Wong is expected to stand down as chairman on 12 June 2022 as he was slated to be Deputy Prime Minister of Singapore on 13 June. Josephine Teo was to take over as chairman from 13 June.
