= Zainudin Nordin =

Singaporean politician

- زاينودين نوردين
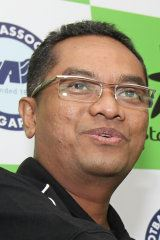
- Zainudin in 2012

Mayor of Central Singapore District
- In office 30 May 2006 – 26 May 2011
- Prime Minister: Lee Hsien Loong
- Preceded by: Heng Chee How
- Succeeded by: Sam Tan

Member of Parliament for Bishan–Toa Payoh GRC
- In office 25 October 2001 – 24 August 2015
- Preceded by: PAP held
- Succeeded by: PAP held
- Majority: 2001: N/A (walkover); 2006: N/A (walkover); 2011: 12,180 (13.86%)

Personal details
- Born: Zainudin bin Nordin; 3 July 1963 (age 63) Colony of Singapore
- Other political affiliations: People's Action Party (2001–2015)

Zainudin bin Nordin (Note: Jawi: زاينودين بن نوردين) (born 3 July 1963) is a Singaporean former politician who served as Mayor of Central Singapore District. A former member of the governing People's Action Party (PAP), he was the Member of Parliament (MP), as part of different PAP teams, representing Bishan–Toa Payoh Group Representation Constituency (GRC) between 2001 and 2015.

Zainudin was also formerly the president of the Football Association of Singapore (FAS) between 2009 and 2016. He is currently the chief strategy officer at food and beverage group, Iron Chef F&B.

== Political career ==
During the 2001 Singaporean general election, Zainudin was part of a five-member PAP team contesting Bishan–Toa Payoh GRC. The team was elected due to a walkover. Zainudin contested the same GRC during the 2006 Singaporean general election as part of the incumbent team of MPs and was elected again after another walkover.

Zainudin was the Mayor of Central Singapore District between 30 May 2006 to 26 May 2011.

During the 2011 general election, Chiam See Tong, the leader of the Singapore People's Party (SPP), left his stronghold of Potong Pasir Single Member Constituency (SMC) to lead a team of five in Bishan–Toa Payoh GRC. Led by Wong Kan Seng, an unchanged PAP team, consisting Zainudin, retained the GRC with 56.93% of the vote.

Zainudin retired from politics prior to the 2015 general election, citing his desire to spend more time with his family.

== Career ==
Zainudin served as president of the FAS between 2009 and 2016.

As of 2021, Zainudin is the chief strategy officer at food and beverage group, Iron Chef F&B.

== Personal life ==
During a parliamentary speech during the Budget 2013 Committee of Supply, Zainudin revealed he did not serve National Service (NS) as he was exempted per the National Service policy's exclusion of some Malays.

== Honours ==
- Chevalier in the National Order of Merit, awarded 25 April 2015 by the French Ambassador to Singapore.

== Notes ==
Parliament of Singapore
Preceded by Davinder Singh; Ibrahim Othman; Leong Horn Kee; Ho Tat Kin; Wong Kan Seng	Member of Parliament for Bishan–Toa Payoh GRC; 2001 – 2015; Served alongside: (2001 – 2006): Davinder Singh, Wong Kan Seng, Leong Horn Kee and Ng Eng Hen (2006 – 2011): Wong Kan Seng, Hri Kumar Nair, Ng Eng Hen and Josephine Teo (2011 – 2015): Josephine Teo, Hri Kumar Nair, Ng Eng Hen and Wong Kan Seng	Succeeded by Chong Kee Hiong; Josephine Teo; Chee Hong Tat; Ng Eng Hen; Saktiandi Supaat
Government offices
Preceded by Heng Chee How	Mayor of Central Singapore District; 30 May 2006 – 26 May 2011	Succeeded by Denise Phua
Sporting positions
Preceded by Ho Peng Kee	President of the Football Association of Singapore; 1 April 2009 – 2016	Succeeded by Lim Kia Tong
