= Josephine Teo =

Singaporean politician

The Honourable Josephine Teo
- 杨莉明
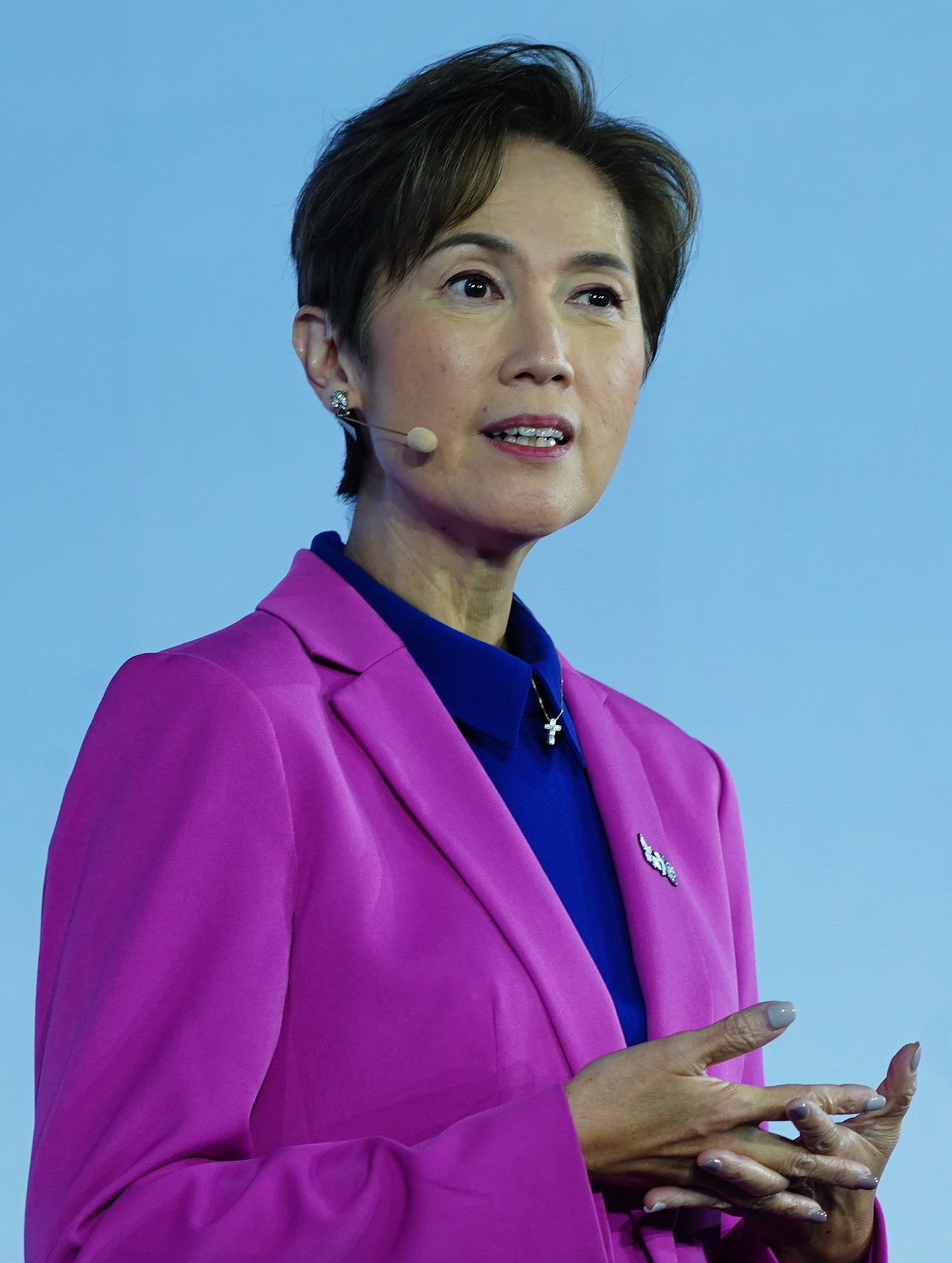
- Teo in 2024

Minister for Digital Development and Information
- Incumbent
- Assumed office 15 May 2021
- Prime Minister: Lee Hsien Loong; Lawrence Wong
- Preceded by: S. Iswaran (As Minister for Communications and Information)

Second Minister for Home Affairs
- In office 11 September 2017 – 23 May 2025
- Prime Minister: Lee Hsien Loong; Lawrence Wong
- Preceded by: Desmond Lee
- Succeeded by: Edwin Tong

Minister for Manpower
- In office 1 May 2018 – 14 May 2021
- Prime Minister: Lee Hsien Loong
- Preceded by: Lim Swee Say
- Succeeded by: Tan See Leng

Member of Parliament for Jalan Besar GRC
- Incumbent
- Assumed office 10 July 2020
- Preceded by: PAP held
- Majority: 2020: 64,631 (65.36%); 2025: 70,602 (75.21%)

Member of Parliament for Bishan-Toa Payoh GRC
- In office 2006–2020
- Preceded by: PAP held
- Succeeded by: PAP held
- Majority: 2006: N/A (walkover); 2011: 62,385 (56.93%); 2015: 86,701 (73.59%)

Personal details
- Born: Yong Li Min (Note: Following marriage, Teo executed a deed poll to adopt an English name (Josephine) and take on her husband's surname (Teo).); 8 July 1968 (age 58) Singapore
- Party: People's Action Party
- Spouse: Teo Eng Cheong
- Children: 3
- Education: National University of Singapore (BA, BSS); London School of Economics (MS)
- Occupation: Minister

Josephine Teo (born Yong Li Min (Note: Chinese: 杨莉明; Pha̍k-fa-sṳ: Yòng Li-mìn) on 8 July 1968) is a Singaporean politician who has been serving as Minister for Digital Development and Information since 2024, and the Minister-in-charge of the Cyber Security Agency and Smart Nation Initiative since 2021. A member of the governing People's Action Party (PAP), she has been the Member of Parliament (MP) representing the Kreta Ayer–Kim Seng division of Jalan Besar Group Representation Constituency (GRC) since 2020. She had previously represented the Toa Payoh East division of Bishan–Toa Payoh GRC from 2006 to 2020.

Prior to entering politics, Teo had worked at the Economic Development Board (EDB), Agency for Science, Technology and Research (A*STAR) and National Trades Union Congress (NTUC). She made her political debut in the 2006 general election as part of a five-member PAP team contesting in Bishan–Toa Payoh GRC and won in a walkover.

In 2022, Teo succeeded Lawrence Wong as Chair of the PAP Community Foundation.

In October 2025, Teo was listed by Fortune as one of its “Most Influential Women”, among 12 women from policymaking, pop culture and professional sports “who together show the diverse ways that power gets expressed across the Asia-Pacific.

== Education ==
Teo attended Dunman High School and Raffles Junior College before graduating from the National University of Singapore with a Bachelor of Arts degree in 1990 and a Bachelor of Social Sciences with honours degree in 1991.

During her studies in NUS, she was awarded several prizes, including the Rachel Meyer Book Prize, which is awarded to the best-performing female candidate in the Faculty of Arts and Social Sciences' final-year examinations.

She subsequently went on to complete a Master of Science degree in economics at the London School of Economics in 1992 under the Economic Development Board–Glaxo Scholarship Programme.

== Early career ==
Teo worked at the Economic Development Board (EDB) from 1992 to 2002. She began her career in enterprise development before she was posted to Suzhou as part of the EDB team working on the China-Singapore Suzhou Industrial Park, where she was responsible for marketing resources. Upon her return to Singapore, she became the EDB's Head of Human Resources.

From 2002 to 2006, Teo was the Head of Human Resources at the Agency for Science, Technology and Research (A*STAR).

In November 2005, Teo also took on the role of Director of Human Resources at the Administration and Research Unit of the National Trades Union Congress (NTUC). After she was elected to Parliament in 2006, Teo took on additional roles within the NTUC and the labour movement. She served as the Executive Secretary of the Singapore Industrial Services Employees' Union (2006–2011). At the Administration and Research Unit, she served as the Alignment Director (Youth Development) and Alignment Director (Organisation Development) (2007–11), and as the Centric Director (Staff) (2008–2011). She also served as the NTUC's Assistant Secretary-General from 2007 to 2011.

From 2009 to 2011, Teo also served as the Chief Executive Officer of Business China, an organisation aimed at improving cultural and economic ties between Singapore and China.

== Political career ==
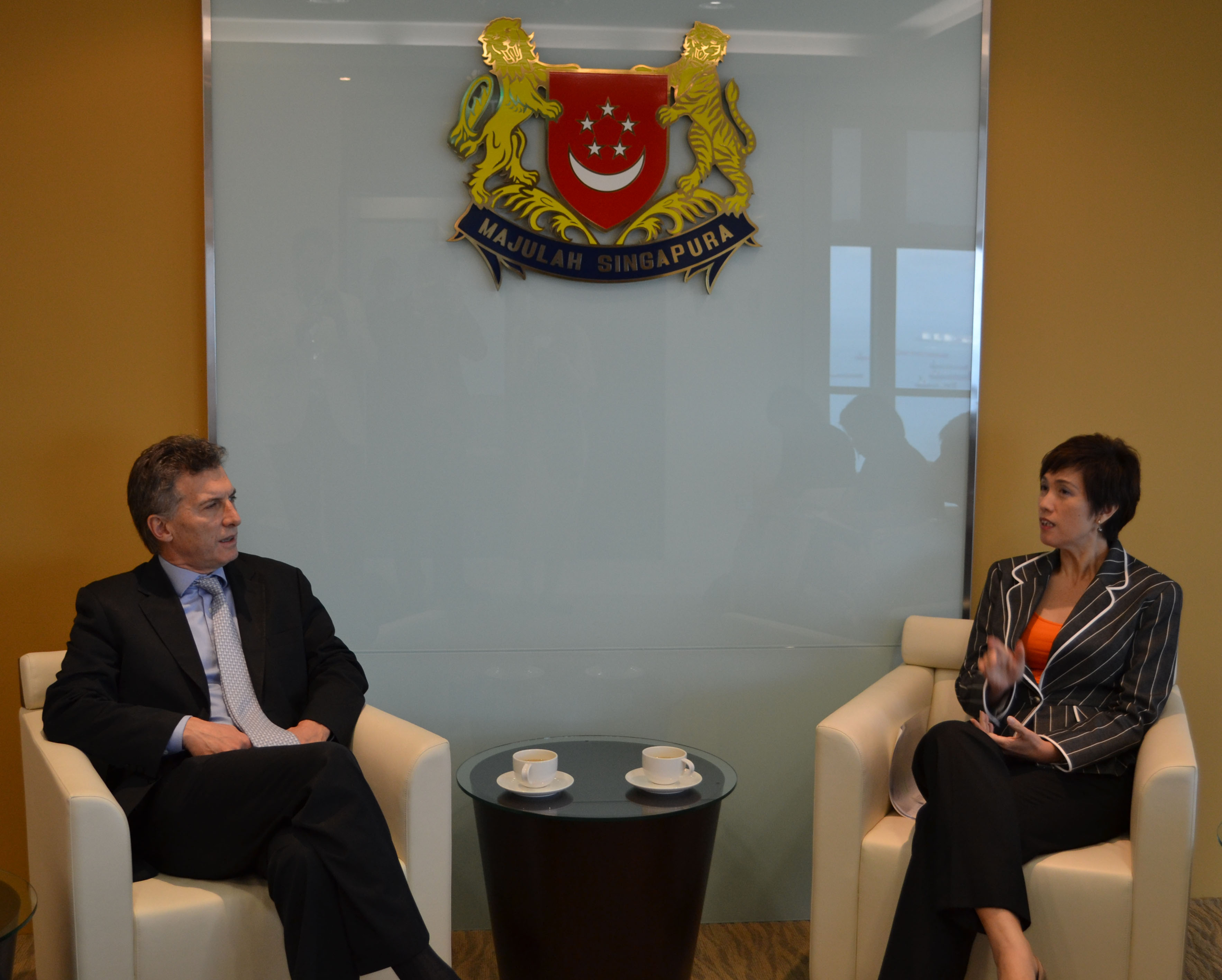
Teo meeting with Mauricio Macri, then the Chief of Government of Buenos Aires, in 2012

=== Early political career ===
Teo made her political debut in the 2006 general election when she contested in Bishan–Toa Payoh GRC as part of a five-member People's Action Party team. The PAP team won by an uncontested walkover and Teo became a Member of Parliament representing the Toa Payoh East ward of Bishan–Toa Payoh GRC.

During her first term in Parliament, Teo served as the Chair of the Government Parliamentary Committee for Education, and as a member of the Government Parliamentary Committee for Defence and Foreign Affairs.

Following the 2011 general election, Teo along with Wong Kan Seng, Hri Kumar, Ng Eng Hen and Zainudin Nordin contested in Bishan–Toa Payoh GRC and won about 57% - against the Singapore People's Party.

On 18 May 2011, Teo was appointed Minister of State at the Ministry of Finance and Ministry of Transport. She was promoted to Senior Minister of State at the Ministries of Finance and Transport on 1 September 2013, and switched to representing the Bishan North ward of Bishan–Toa Payoh GRC. She relinquished her position as Senior Minister of State at the Ministry of Finance on 30 September 2015.

Following the 2015 general election, Teo along with Chong Kee Hiong, Chee Hong Tat, Ng Eng Hen and Saktiandi Supaat contested in Bishan–Toa Payoh GRC and won about 74%, higher than the previous election against the Singapore People's Party.

=== As Minister ===
On 1 May 2017, Teo was promoted to full Minister and appointed Minister in the Prime Minister's Office, Second Minister for Manpower, and Second Minister for Foreign Affairs. She also oversaw the National Population and Talent Division, a department in the Prime Minister's Office. On 11 September 2017, she relinquished her portfolio as Second Minister for Foreign Affairs and became Second Minister for Home Affairs.

On 1 May 2018, Teo succeeded Lim Swee Say as Minister for Manpower and continued to hold the portfolio of Second Minister for Home Affairs.

During the COVID-19 pandemic in Singapore, despite effective handling of initial waves of infection, several serious outbreaks in April have brought the situation in Singapore out of control; many analysts points to poor conditions at foreign workers dormitories as a major factor of the failure.

The pandemic brought the living conditions at foreign worker dormitories to media attention. Dormitories were reported to be unsanitary and crowded, making preventive measures like social distancing difficult. Retired diplomat Tommy Koh criticised the living conditions, calling it "third world" and "a time bomb waiting to explode". Amnesty International called the situation a "recipe for disaster". Teo vowed to improve the living conditions of foreign workers after the quarantine was handled.

On 9 April, MOM said in a press release that it will improve quality of meals of foreign workers during quarantine and formed a task force to improve the living conditions of foreign workers. As of 25 April 25 dormitories have been gazetted as isolation areas. Some healthy workers are also progressively being moved to numerous empty premises such as SAF camps, HDB blocks, floating hotels and Changi Exhibition Centre. On 16 April, Teo said that there will be a "three-pronged strategy"; containing the spread, imposing lockdowns and separating workers in essential services.

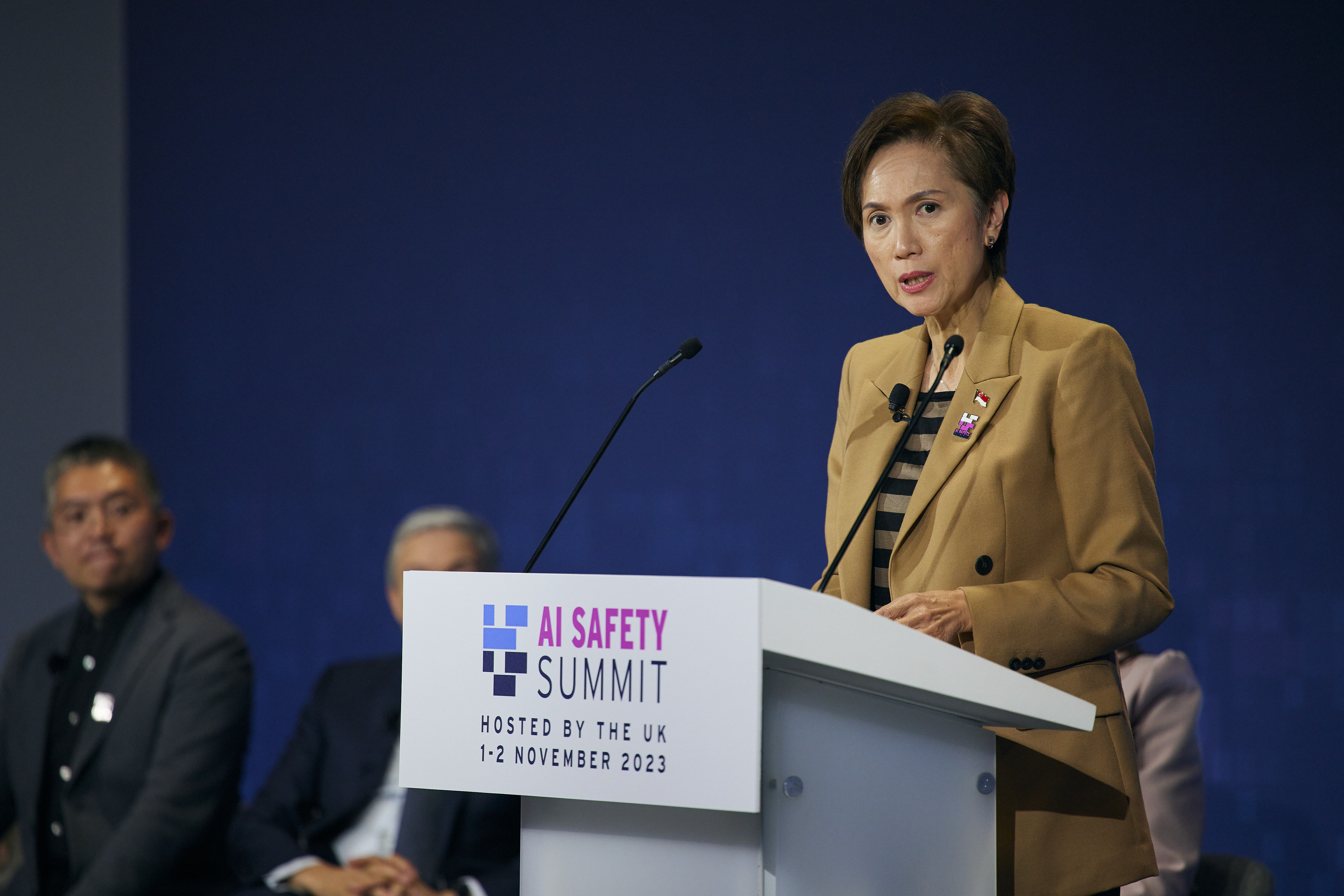
Teo speaking at the AI Safety Summit in the United Kingdom in 2023

Prior to the 2020 general election, Teo moved from Bishan-Toa Payoh GRC to contest in Jalan Besar GRC.

Teo along with Denise Phua, Wan Rizal Wan Zakariah and Heng Chee How contested in Jalan Besar GRC against the Peoples Voice and won about 65% of the vote. Teo then became the Member of Parliament representing the Kreta Ayer-Kim Seng ward of Jalan Besar GRC.

Teo was the PAP Community Foundation executive committee for 12 years as a member and the chairwoman from 2016 to 2020 and in October 2020 she was appointed as deputy chairwoman of the PCF management council.

Following a Cabinet reshuffle in May 2021, Teo succeeded S. Iswaran as Minister for Communication and Information while continuing to serve as Second Minister for Home Affairs. In addition, she was appointed Minister-in-charge of the Cyber Security Agency and Minister-in-charge of the Smart Nation Initiative.

In June 2022, Teo was announced the new PAP Community Foundation (PCF) management council chairman, taking over from Lawrence Wong who is the Minister of Finance as he is being promoted to Deputy Prime Minister.

During the 2025 general election, Teo contested Jalan Besar GRC as the anchor minister for the PAP team.

== Political positions ==
=== Online Safety ===
As Minister for Communications and Information, Teo introduced the Online Safety (Miscellaneous Amendments) Bill which was passed unanimously in Parliament on 9 November 2022.

In 2023, as Second Minister for Home Affairs, Teo introduced the Online Criminal Harms Act, which allowed authorities to take down websites, apps, and online accounts suspected of facilitating criminal behaviour, including scams.

In November 2025, Teo led the passage of a new law - the Online Safety (Relief and Accountability) Bill - to offer timely redress and better protection to victims of online harms. The law paved the way for the set-up of a one-stop government Commission, where victims can seek timely and effective support against harmful online content.

=== Family planning ===
In a media interview in October 2016, Teo responded to questions of whether Singaporeans were getting their Housing and Development Board flats early enough in order to start a family, stating that one "does not need much space to have sex". Teo further added that "in France, in the U.K., in Nordic countries, man meets woman [and] they can make a baby already. They love each other." Teo's words drew flak from on social media, with netizens criticising her for lacking empathy towards couples and being insensitive towards couples' practical considerations such as being able to secure a HDB flat before starting a family, as well as accusing her of promoting premarital sex in conservative Singapore.

When asked about this in a 2019 interview by The Straits Times, Teo acknowledged that she “should not have said that. It was meant as a private joke but, you know, when you are in public life, nothing is really private anymore. So, lesson learnt.”

=== Cost of living ===
In May 2017, Teo commented on her Facebook page about the high cost of milk powder in Singapore, saying that "milk is milk, however fancy the marketing", and that she would buy whichever was the cheapest brand of milk powder approved for sale by the Agri-Food and Veterinary Authority for her own children.

On 26 October 2018, during a conference held by the Institute of Policy Studies, Teo commented that implementing a minimum wage in Singapore may instead lead to higher unemployment and that Singapore's income inequality gap is "a problem of success" that is "difficult to overcome". Instead, to address such concerns, Teo said that the Government implemented measures such as the Workfare Income Supplement Scheme, which topped up the income of low-wage workers, “thereby achieving the same uplift as a minimum wage”.

=== Risks of Dis- and Misinformation to Elections Integrity ===
Teo introduced the Elections (Integrity of Online Advertising) (Amendment) Bill which was passed in Parliament on 15 October 2024. The Bill prohibits the online publication of deepfakes and digitally manipulated content of political candidates during the election period.

== Personal life ==
Teo is married to Teo Eng Cheong, who is the Chief Executive Officer of Sino-Singapore Tianjin Eco-City and Investment Development Co (SSTEC) and former Chief Executive Officer of Surbana Jurong. They have two daughters and a son.

== Notes ==
Political offices
Preceded by Chan Chun Sing	Minister in the Prime Minister's Office; 2017 – 2018; Served alongside: Chan Chun Sing, Desmond Lee	Succeeded by Ng Chee Meng; Indranee Rajah
Preceded by Lim Swee Say	Minister for Manpower; 2018 – 2021	Succeeded by Tan See Leng
Preceded by S. Iswaran	Minister for Communications and Information; 2021 – present	Incumbent
Parliament of Singapore
Preceded by Wong Kan Seng; Zainudin Nordin; Leong Horn Kee; Ng Eng Hen; Davinder Singh	Member of Parliament for Bishan–Toa Payoh GRC; 2006–2020; Served alongside: (2006–2011): Wong Kan Seng, Zainudin Nordin, Hri Kumar Nair, Ng Eng Hen (2011–2015): Wong Kan Seng, Zainudin Nordin, Hri Kumar Nair, Ng Eng Hen (2015–2020): Chong Kee Hiong, Chee Hong Tat, Ng Eng Hen, Saktiandi Supaat	Succeeded by Chong Kee Hiong; Chee Hong Tat; Ng Eng Hen; Saktiandi Supaat
Preceded by Yaacob Ibrahim; Lily Neo; Heng Chee How; Denise Phua	Member of Parliament for Jalan Besar GRC; 2020–present Served alongside: (2020–2025): Denise Phua, Wan Rizal, Heng Chee How (2025–present): Denise Phua, Wan Rizal, Shawn Loh	Incumbent
