= Bishan–Toa Payoh Group Representation Constituency =

Electoral division in Singapore

Coordinates: 1.344°N 103.84°E

Bishan–Toa Payoh
- Kawasan Undi Perwakilan Berkumpulan Bishan–Toa Payoh 碧山–大巴窑集选区 பீஷான்-தோ பாயோ குழுப் பிரதிநிதித்துவத் தொகுதி
- Group Representation constituency for the Parliament of Singapore
- Region: Central Region, Singapore
- Electorate: 98,708

Current constituency
- Created: 1997; 29 years ago
- Seats: 4
- Party: People's Action Party
- Members: Cai Yinzhou; Chee Hong Tat; Elysa Chen; Saktiandi Supaat
- Town Council: Bishan–Toa Payoh
- Created from: Thomson GRC; Toa Payoh GRC; Kim Keat SMC; Kuo Chuan SMC

The Bishan–Toa Payoh Group Representation Constituency (GRC) is a four-member Group Representation Constituency located in the central region of Singapore. There are four divisions of the GRC: Bishan East–Sin Ming, Toa Payoh West–Thomson, Toa Payoh East and Toa Payoh Central, managed by Bishan–Toa Payoh Town Council. The current Member of Parliament (MP) are Cai Yinzhou, Minister of National Development Chee Hong Tat, Elysa Chen and Saktiandi Supaat, from the People's Action Party (PAP).

== History ==
The GRC was formed prior to the 1997 general election with five seats; the PAP won uncontested. Ho and Ibrahim retired from politics during the 2001 general election with Zainudin Nordin and Ng Eng Hen replacing them. The GRC was uncontested again. In 2006, Leong and Davinder retired from politics and was replaced with Hri Kumar Nair and Josephine Teo. The GRC was uncontested for the third time.

During the 2011 general election, Chiam See Tong, the leader of the Singapore People's Party (SPP), left his stronghold of Potong Pasir Single Member Constituency (SMC) to lead a team of five in Bishan–Toa Payoh GRC. Led by Wong Kan Seng, the unchanged PAP team retained the GRC with 56.93% of the vote.

The GRC's boundaries remained intact since its formation until 2015 when it was expanded in size to include Balestier, MacRitchie Reservoir and Novena. The westernmost portion of Bishan–Toa Payoh GRC consists of part of the Central Catchment Nature Reserve which is shared with Holland–Bukit Timah GRC and Kebun Baru SMC.

Before the 2015 general election, Wong, Nair and Zainudin retired from politics with the latter two for personal reasons. SPP contested the GRC against the PAP team with Ng Eng Hen leading the team. The PAP team won the elections consecutively for the second time with the results of 73.59%.

During the 2020 general election, Balestier and Novena was subsumed into the neighbouring Jalan Besar GRC. Some residential areas in Potong Pasir SMC were absorbed into Toa Payoh East. Bishan North and Shunfu was carved out and was absorbed into the new Marymount SMC. The GRC was reduced to four. Josephine Teo left the GRC to lead the PAP team for Jalan Besar GRC.

The SPP contested the GRC again and only managed to gain 32.74% of the votes while the PAP team won the elections again for third time consecutively with the results of 67.26%.

During the 2025 general election, incumbent MPs Ng Eng Hen and Chong Kee Hiong announced their retirement from politics. Chee Hong Tat became the new PAP anchor minister, with Saktiandi Supaat remaining and two new candidates Cai Yinzhou and Elysa Chen joining the team to contest the GRC against a SPP team led by Steve Chia. The PAP team won the contest with 75 percent of the vote.

== Constituency profile ==
The GRC consists the entire areas of Bishan (excluding Bishan North), the majority of Toa Payoh, parts of Thomson, Singapore

== Members of Parliament ==
Divisions or wards of Bishan–Toa Payoh GRC as of the 2025 general election:
1 Bishan East-Sin Ming (part)
2 Bishan East-Sin Ming (part)
3 Toa Payoh Central
4 Toa Payoh East
5 Toa Payoh West-Thomson

Election	Division	Incumbent	Party
Formation
1997	Bishan East; Bishan North; Thomson; Toa Payoh Central; Toa Payoh East	Wong Kan Seng; Ibrahim Othman; Leong Horn Kee; Ho Tat Kin; Davinder Singh	PAP
2001	Bishan East; Bishan North; Thomson; Toa Payoh Central; Toa Payoh East	Wong Kan Seng; Zainudin Nordin; Leong Horn Kee; Ng Eng Hen; Davinder Singh	PAP
2006	Bishan East; Bishan North; Thomson; Toa Payoh Central; Toa Payoh East	Wong Kan Seng; Zainudin Nordin; Hri Kumar Nair; Ng Eng Hen; Josephine Teo	PAP
2011	Bishan East; Bishan North; Thomson; Toa Payoh Central; Toa Payoh East	Wong Kan Seng; Josephine Teo; Hri Kumar Nair; Ng Eng Hen; Zainudin Nordin	PAP
2015	Bishan East; Bishan North; Toa Payoh West; Toa Payoh Central; Toa Payoh East	Chong Kee Hiong; Josephine Teo; Chee Hong Tat; Ng Eng Hen; Saktiandi Supaat	PAP
2020	Bishan East; Toa Payoh West; Toa Payoh Central; Toa Payoh East	Chong Kee Hiong; Chee Hong Tat; Ng Eng Hen; Saktiandi Supaat	PAP
2025	Bishan East–Sin Ming; Toa Payoh West–Thomson; Toa Payoh Central; Toa Payoh East	Elysa Chen; Chee Hong Tat; Cai Yinzhou; Saktiandi Supaat	PAP

== Electoral results ==
Note: The Elections Department does not include rejected votes when calculating the vote shares of candidates. Hence, all candidates' vote shares will total to 100% at any given election (may not appear so in multi-way contests due to rounding).

=== Elections in 1990s ===
General Election 1997
Party	Candidate	Votes	%
PAP	Davinder Singh; Ho Tat Kin; Ibrahim Othman; Leong Horn Kee; Wong Kan Seng	Unopposed	
Registered electors		122,256	
PAP win (new seat)			

=== Elections in 2000s ===
General Election 2001
Party	Candidate	Votes	%	±%
PAP	Davinder Singh; Leong Horn Kee; Ng Eng Hen; Wong Kan Seng; Zainudin Nordin	Unopposed		
Registered electors		114,621		▼6.25
PAP hold				

General Election 2006
Party	Candidate	Votes	%	±%
PAP	Hri Kumar; Josephine Teo; Ng Eng Hen; Wong Kan Seng; Zainudin Nordin	Unopposed		
Registered electors		115,323		▲0.61
PAP hold				

=== Elections in 2010s ===
General Election 2011
Party	Candidate	Votes	%	±%
PAP	Hri Kumar Josephine Teo Ng Eng Hen Wong Kan Seng Zainudin Nordin	62,385	56.93	N/A
SPP	Benjamin Pwee Chiam See Tong Jimmy Lee Mohamad Hamim Bin Aliyas Wilfred Leung	47,205	43.07	N/A
Majority		12,180	13.86	N/A
Total valid votes		109,590	98.13	N/A
Rejected ballots		2,087	1.87	N/A
Turnout		111,677	91.17	N/A
Registered electors		122,492		▲6.22
PAP hold		Swing	N/A	

General Election 2015
Party	Candidate	Votes	%	±%
PAP	Chee Hong Tat Chong Kee Hiong Josephine Teo Ng Eng Hen Saktiandi Supaat	86,701	73.59	▲16.66
SPP	Benjamin Pwee Bryan Long Law Kim Hwee Mohamad Abdillah Bin Zamzuri Mohamad Hamim Bin Aliyas	31,108	26.41	▼16.66
Majority		55,593	47.18	▲33.32
Total valid votes		117,809	98.20	▲7.03
Rejected ballots		2,415	1.80	▼7.03
Turnout		119,974	92.31	▲1.14
Registered electors		129,975		▲6.11
PAP hold		Swing	▲16.66	

=== Elections in 2020s ===
General Election 2020
Party	Candidate	Votes	%	±%
PAP	Chee Hong Tat Chong Kee Hiong Ng Eng Hen Saktiandi Supaat	62,983	67.23	▼6.36
SPP	Melvyn Chiu Osman Sulaiman Steve Chia Williamson Lee	30,696	32.77	▲6.36
Majority		32,287	34.46	▼12.72
Total valid votes		93,679	97.86	
Rejected ballots		2,049	2.14	
Turnout		95,728	94.57	▲2.26
Registered electors		101,220		
PAP hold		Swing	▼6.36	

General Election 2025
Party	Candidate	Votes	%	±%
PAP	Cai Yinzhou Chee Hong Tat Elysa Chen Saktiandi Supaat	66,455	75.18	▲7.98
SPP	Lim Rui Xian Melvyn Chiu Muhammad Norhakim Steve Chia	21,944	24.82	▼7.98
Majority		44,511	50.36	▲15.90
Total valid votes		88,399	97.69	▼0.17
Rejected ballots		2,092	2.31	▲0.17
Turnout		90,491	91.68	▼2.89
Registered electors		98,708		▼2.48
PAP hold		Swing	▲7.98	
