= Hri Kumar Nair =

Singaporean judge and lawyer

Hri Kumar Nair SC
- ഹരി കുമാർ നായർ
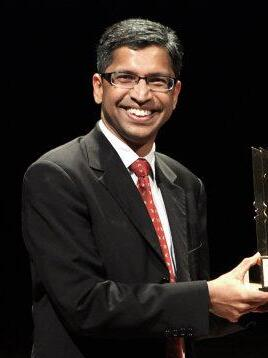
- Nair in 2011

Justice of the Court of Appeal of Singapore
- Incumbent
- Assumed office 1 October 2025
- Appointed by: Tharman Shanmugaratnam

Judge of the High Court of Singapore
- In office 2 January 2023 – 1 October 2025
- Appointed by: Halimah Yacob

Deputy Attorney-General of Singapore
- In office 1 March 2017 – 2 January 2023 Serving with Lionel Yee (Jan. 2017 - Jan. 2023); Tai Wei Shyong (Jan. 2021 - Jan 2023); Ang Cheng Hock (Oct. 2022 - Jan 2023)
- Appointed by: Tony Tan

Member of Parliament for Bishan–Toa Payoh GRC
- In office 7 May 2006 – 11 September 2015
- Preceded by: PAP held
- Succeeded by: PAP held
- Majority: 2006: N/A (walkover); 2011: 12,180 (13.86%)

Personal details
- Born: 16 June 1966 (age 60) Singapore
- Other political affiliations: People's Action Party (2006–2015)
- Education: National University of Singapore (LLB)

Hri Kumar Nair (Note: Malayalam: ഹരി കുമാർ നായർ, romanized: Hari Kumāṟ Nāyaṟ) SC (born 16 June 1966) is a Singaporean lawyer and former politician who has been serving as a Judge of the High Court of Singapore since 2023. A former member of the People's Action Party, he was a Member of Parliament (MP) for the Bishan–Toa Payoh Group Representation Constituency (GRC) between 2006 and 2015. He was also a former Deputy Attorney-General of Singapore between 2017 and 2023.

== Education ==
Nair attended National Junior College before graduating from the National University of Singapore in 1991 with a Bachelor of Laws degree.

== Career ==
=== Legal career ===
Nair was called to the Singapore Bar in 1992. He joined Drew & Napier and became a director of the firm. He was appointed senior counsel in 2008.

Nair was appointed as the deputy attorney-general (DAG) for a three-year term starting on 1 March 2017, followed by another three-year term commencing on 1 March 2020. He has since resigned as a member of the People's Action Party as well as the director of Drew & Napier. He was the first ex-lawmaker in Singapore to take on the role of a public prosecutor.

Nair was involved with several high profile cases during his term as DAG, including the appeal of the City Harvest Church trial and Tan Cheng Bock's constitutional challenge to the elected presidency in 2017. Nair, in his capacity as the DAG representing the government, was criticised by Tan for his comments in the High Court. Nair was quoted to have said that Tan's motives "are purely selfish and he has shown no regard for the principle of multiracial representation which Parliament intended to safeguard".

In November 2017, Nair appeared before the Court of Appeal to argue against the acquittal of Mohd Ariffan Mohd Hassan, who was accused of raping his lover's daughter. The court upheld Mohd Hassan's acquittal and dismissed the appeal, issuing a landmark judgment setting out the criteria for bringing in fresh evidence applying to the prosecution. In June 2018, Nair successfully argued the prosecution's appeal for the death penalty to be imposed on Chia Kee Chen, who murdered his wife's ex-lover Dexmon Chua. In 2019, Nair led the prosecution team during the trial of Leslie Khoo Kwee Hock, who strangled his girlfriend Cui Yajie near Gardens by the Bay and burned her body in what was known as the "Gardens by the Bay murder" case. Khoo was subsequently convicted of murder in July 2019, and the prosecution argued for him to be sentenced to life imprisonment, on the account that his actions did not warrant capital punishment since he did not exhibit any viciousness or blatant disregard for human life. The judge agreed, and imposed a life sentence on 19 August 2019. Khoo appealed against his conviction and sentence, but later withdrew it. Nair also acted for the prosecution in the appeal hearing of Roshdi Abdullah Altway, a drug trafficker who was sentenced to death in 2020 despite his defence of safekeeping the drugs and not for the purpose of trafficking. Roshdi was previously sentenced to hang in 1994 for murdering a Central Narcotics Bureau inspector before he escaped the gallows and re-sentenced to ten years' jail upon an appeal. Roshdi was eventually hanged on 10 April 2025 after losing his appeals.

In September 2020, Nair was appointed to conduct a prosecutorial review for a wrongful conviction case of a domestic worker, Parti Liyani, who was wrongfully accused of theft.

Nair begun serving as a Judge in the High Court from 2 January 2023, following his appointment by President Halimah Yacob

=== Political career ===
From 2006 to 2015, Nair was a member of parliament for Bishan–Toa Payoh GRC. He was once an advisor to the Bishan–Toa Payoh grassroots organisations. He was appointed chairman of the Bishan–Toa Payoh Town Council from 2011 to 2015. He was succeeded by Chong Kee Hiong and the head of the Government Parliamentary Committees for Home Affairs and Law.

In May 2009, Nair proposed during a Parliamentary debate that the government can appoint a Cabinet Minister from the pool of Nominated Members of Parliament to draw on the experience of many capable Singaporeans. He expressed the view that this would not offend democratic principles. Singapore's Parliamentary system placed more weight on the party in power rather than individual MPs, and "Parliamentarians must still win the support from the ground and, ultimately, the PM and the ruling party and his Cabinet team will still be answerable to the electorate at elections." Critics have commented that adopting the practice would disenchant Singaporeans, deepen the already parochial political culture, and lead to a lack of accountability and legitimacy.

Nair has spoken out in favour of the repeal of Section 377A of the Penal Code in Singapore, which criminalises homosexual sex. He is known for criticising the opposition for not taking a stand on contentious issues and for his criticisms of the Worker's Party's management of the Aljunied–Hougang Town Council.

Nair retired from politics before the 2015 Singaporean general election, citing his wife’s diagnosis of lymphoma in 2012 as a factor.

== Directorships ==
Nair has held several directorships.

- People’s Association Board of Management (1 January 2007 – 31 May 2011)
- Bishan EC Pte Ltd (11 September 2008 – 21 February 2012)
- Riviera Properties Pte. Ltd. (23 August 2006 – 13 September 2012)
- NTUC Choice Homes Co-Operative Ltd (23 August 2006 – 13 September 2012)
- Media Development Authority of Singapore (1 January 2007 – 31 December 2012)
- NTUC Foodfare Co-operative Ltd (21 September 2012 – 25 May 2015)
- NTUC Income (3 September 2015 – 2017)

== Personal life ==
Nair is the youngest of nine children in his family. His first name is pronounced and was originally intended to be spelt as "Hari"; the current spelling is a result of a typing error in the original copy of his birth certificate that was never rectified. His wife is a partner of Ernst & Young. His only child, a daughter, was born in 2006 or 2007.

Parliament of Singapore
| Preceded by Wong Kan Seng; Zainudin Nordin; Leong Horn Kee; Ng Eng Hen; Davinder Singh | Member of Parliament for Bishan–Toa Payoh GRC; 2006–2015; Served alongside: (2006–2011): Wong Kan Seng, Zainudin Nordin, Josephine Teo and Ng Eng Hen (2011–2015): Wong Kan Seng, Zainudin Nordin, Josephine Teo and Ng Eng Hen | Succeeded by Chong Kee Hiong; Chee Hong Tat; Ng Eng Hen; Saktiandi Supaat |
