= Ng Eng Hen =

Singaporean politician

- 黄永宏
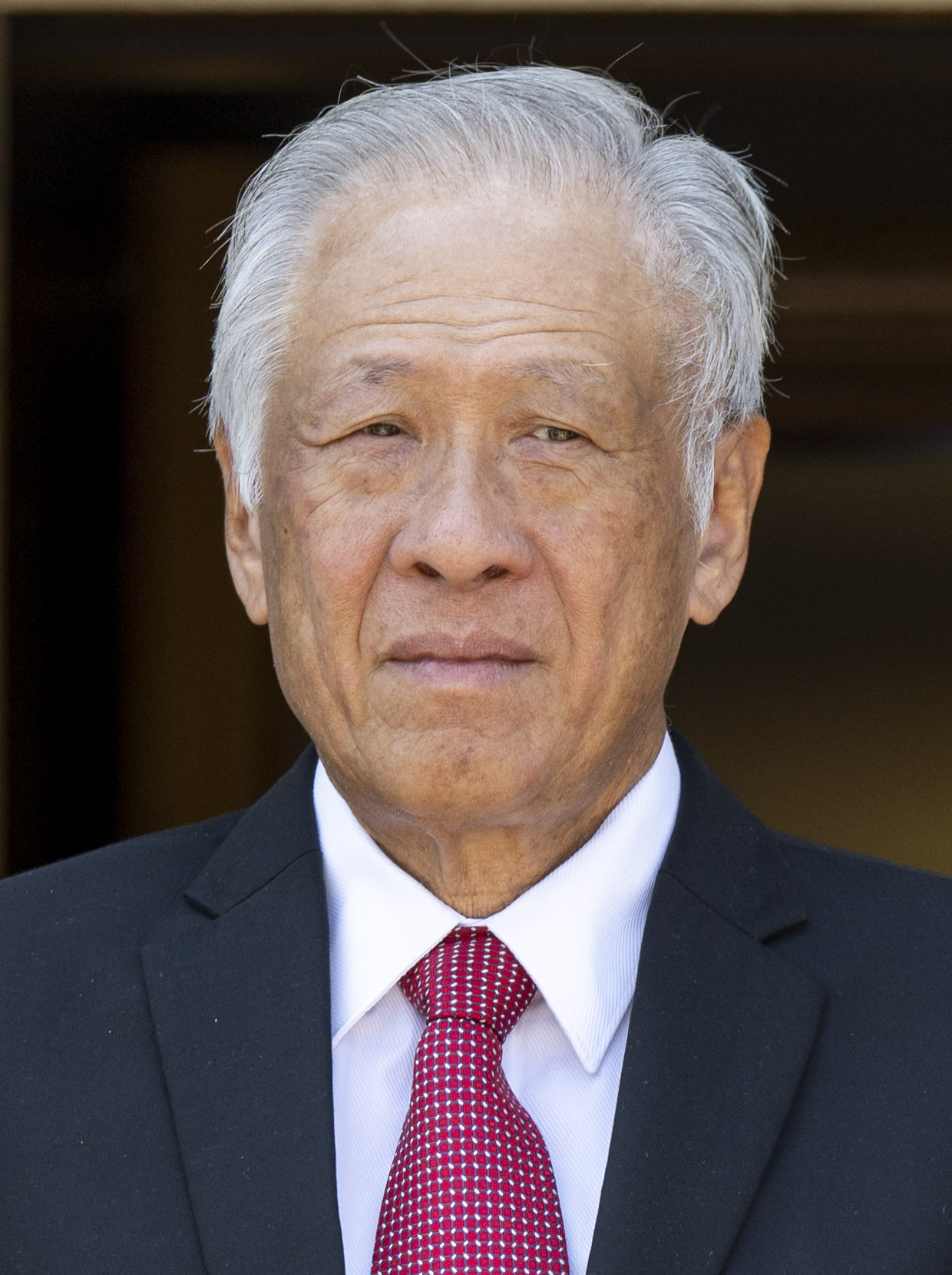
- Ng in 2024

Minister for Defence
- In office 21 May 2011 – 22 May 2025
- Prime Minister: Lee Hsien Loong; Lawrence Wong
- Second Minister: Chan Chun Sing (2013–2015); Lui Tuck Yew (2015); Ong Ye Kung (2016–2018)
- Preceded by: Teo Chee Hean
- Succeeded by: Chan Chun Sing

Leader of the House
- In office 31 May 2011 – 30 September 2015
- Prime Minister: Lee Hsien Loong
- Deputy: Heng Chee How
- Preceded by: Mah Bow Tan
- Succeeded by: Grace Fu

Minister for Education
- In office 1 April 2008 – 20 May 2011
- Prime Minister: Lee Hsien Loong
- Preceded by: Tharman Shanmugaratnam
- Succeeded by: Heng Swee Keat

Second Minister for Defence
- In office 1 July 2005 – 20 May 2011
- Prime Minister: Lee Hsien Loong
- Minister: Teo Chee Hean
- Preceded by: Teo Chee Hean
- Succeeded by: Chan Chun Sing (2013)

Minister for Manpower
- In office 12 August 2004 – 31 March 2008; Acting: 12 May 2003 - 11 August 2004
- Prime Minister: Lee Hsien Loong
- Preceded by: Lee Boon Yang
- Succeeded by: Gan Kim Yong

Second Minister for Education
- In office 12 August 2004 – 30 June 2005
- Prime Minister: Lee Hsien Loong
- Minister: Tharman Shanmugaratnam
- Succeeded by: Indranee Rajah

Member of the Singapore Parliament for Bishan–Toa Payoh GRC
- In office 25 October 2001 – 15 April 2025
- Preceded by: PAP held
- Succeeded by: PAP held
- Majority: 2001: N/A (walkover); 2006: N/A (walkover); 2011: 12,180 (13.86%); 2015: 55,465 (47.18%); 2020: 32,287 (34.46%)

Personal details
- Born: Ng Eng Hen; 10 December 1958 (age 67) Colony of Singapore
- Other political affiliations: People's Action Party (2001—2025)
- Spouse: Ivy Lim Swee Lian
- Children: 4
- Education: National University of Singapore (MBBS)

Ng Eng Hen (Note: Chinese: 黄永宏; Hinghwa Romanized: Ńg Ṳ̂ng-héng; pinyin: Huáng Yǒnghóng) (born 10 December 1958) is a Singaporean former politician and oncologist who previously served as Minister for Defence from 2011 to 2025. A former member of the governing People's Action Party (PAP), he was the Member of Parliament (MP), as part of different PAP teams, representing Bishan–Toa Payoh Group Representation Constituency (GRC) from 2001 to 2025.

Prior to joining politics, Ng was a consultant surgeon at the Singapore General Hospital (SGH) and later a private surgical oncologist at Mount Elizabeth Hospital. He made his political debut in the 2001 general election as part of a five-member PAP team contesting in Bishan–Toa Payoh GRC and won by a walkover. Ng was later elected as an MP and has been winning subsequent general elections since.

Before becoming the Minister of Defence, Ng had been Second Minister for Education between 2004 and 2005, Minister for Manpower between 2004 and 2008, Second Minister for Defence between 2005 and 2011 and Leader of the House between 2011 and 2015. Ng is also the Chairman of SAFRA Board of Governors.

== Early life and education ==
A Chinese Singaporean of Henghua descent, Ng and his five siblings lived in a rental flat in Zion Road during his childhood. He was educated at Anglo-Chinese School and National Junior College before completing medical school at the National University of Singapore. He also underwent fellowship training in surgical oncology at the University of Texas MD Anderson Cancer Center.

== Career ==
Ng was a consultant surgeon at the Singapore General Hospital between 1992 and 1997 before he went into private practice at Mount Elizabeth Hospital as a surgical oncologist between 1997 and 2001.

=== Political career ===
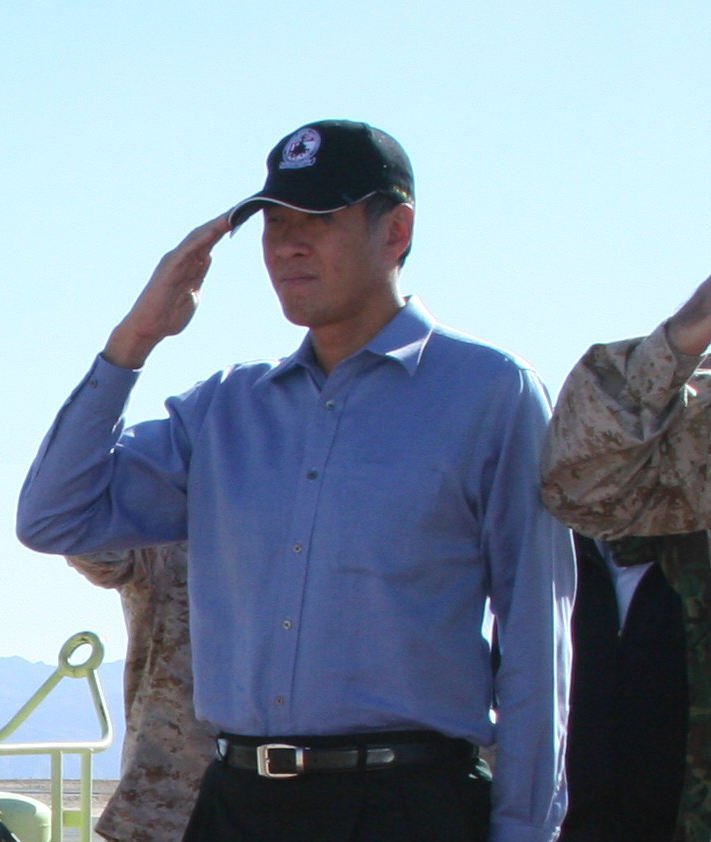
Ng in November 2005

Ng made his political debut in the 2001 general election as part of a five-member PAP team contesting in Bishan–Toa Payoh GRC. The PAP team won with a walkover and Ng was elected as a MP for Bishan–Toa Payoh GRC.

In 2002, Ng was appointed Minister of State for Education and Minister of State for Manpower. In August 2004, Ng was promoted to full Minister and appointed Minister for Manpower and Second Minister for Education. In 2005, he relinquished his portfolio as Second Minister for Education and became Second Minister for Defence. In April 2008, he stepped down from his post as Minister for Manpower and took up the portfolio of Minister for Education.

Ng was also Chairman of the Jobs Task Force at the Ministry of Manpower, and Chairman of the Inter-Ministerial Committee on Low Wage Workers. In June 2007, Ng was invited by the French Ministry of Defence to visit the Paris Air Show and also to visit a permanent Republic of Singapore Air Force (RSAF) detachment stationed at Cazaux Air Base.

In March 2010, Ng mentioned that the weight of mother-tongue language examinations in the Primary School Leaving Examination (PSLE) might be reduced in order to benefit some students who are weak in their mother-tongue due to the emphasis on the English language in the Singapore education system. This sparked a debate among Singaporeans who support emphasis on mother-tongue languages in education. Ng subsequently assured Singaporeans that the weight of mother-tongue language in the PSLE would not be reduced.

During the 2011 general election, Ng was part of a five-member PAP team contesting in Bishan–Toa Payoh GRC and won 56.93% of the vote against the Singapore People's Party.

In 2011, Ng stepped down from his role as Minister for Education and was appointed Minister for Defence. In Parliament, he served as Deputy Leader of the House between 2007 and 2011 and later as Leader of the House between 2011 and 2015.

During 2015 general election, Ng lead the five-member PAP team contesting in Bishan–Toa Payoh GRC and won 73.59% of the vote against a second challenge by the Singapore People's Party.

In 2018, the French government awarded Ng the Legion of Honour.

During the 2020 general election, Ng was part of a four-member PAP team contesting in Bishan–Toa Payoh GRC and won about 67% of the vote against the Singapore People's Party.

On 4 November 2021, Ng described Taiwan's political status as an issue that for the People's Republic of China, "goes to the heart of the political legitimacy of the leader, of the party of the party and it's a deep red line. I can think of no scenario which there are winners if there is an actual physical confrontation over Taiwan ... So, I would advise us to stay very far away from that." On 17 February 2025, at the 61st Munich Security Conference, Ng stated that the Asian perspectives of the U.S. have shifted from being perceived as a force of "moral legitimacy” to "a landlord seeking rent." His remarks came following tensions between President of the United States Donald Trump and other NATO members over the Russian invasion of Ukraine.

On 18 April 2025, Ng announced he would not contest the general election held in May that year and his retirement from politics.

== Personal life ==
Ng is married to Ivy Ng Swee Lian, a paediatrician and geneticist who has been serving as a senior advisor to SingHealth Board. The couple have four children.

== Honours ==
- France:
  - Officer of the Legion of Honour - 20 February 2018
- Germany:
  - Grand Cross of the Order of Merit of the Federal Republic of Germany - 24 March 2026

Political offices
Preceded by None	Second Minister for Education; 2002–2003	Succeeded by None
Preceded by Teo Chee Hean	Second Minister for Defence; 2003–2011	Succeeded by None
Preceded by Lee Boon Yang	Minister for Manpower; 2003–2008; Acting: 2003–2004	Succeeded by Gan Kim Yong
Preceded by Tharman Shanmugaratnam	Minister for Education; 2008–2011	Succeeded by Heng Swee Keat
Preceded by Teo Chee Hean	Minister for Defence; 2011–2025	Succeeded by Chan Chun Sing
Parliament of Singapore
Preceded by Davinder Singh; Ibrahim Othman; Leong Horn Kee; Ho Tat Kin; Wong Kan Seng	Member of Parliament for Bishan–Toa Payoh GRC; 2001–2025; Served alongside: (2001 – 2006): Davinder Singh, Wong Kan Seng, Leong Horn Kee and Zainudin Nordin (2006 – 2011): Wong Kan Seng, Hri Kumar Nair, Zainudin Nordin and Josephine Teo (2011 – 2015): Josephine Teo, Hri Kumar Nair, Zainudin Nordin and Wong Kan Seng (2015–2020): Chong Kee Hiong, Josephine Teo, Chee Hong Tat and Saktiandi Supaat (2020–2025): Chong Kee Hiong, Chee Hong Tat and Saktiandi Supaat	Succeeded by Elysa Chen; Chee Hong Tat; Cai Yinzhou; Saktiandi Supaat
Preceded by Mah Bow Tan	Leader of the House; 2011–2015	Succeeded by Grace Fu
