= Chong Kee Hiong =

Singaporean politician and businessman

- 钟奇雄
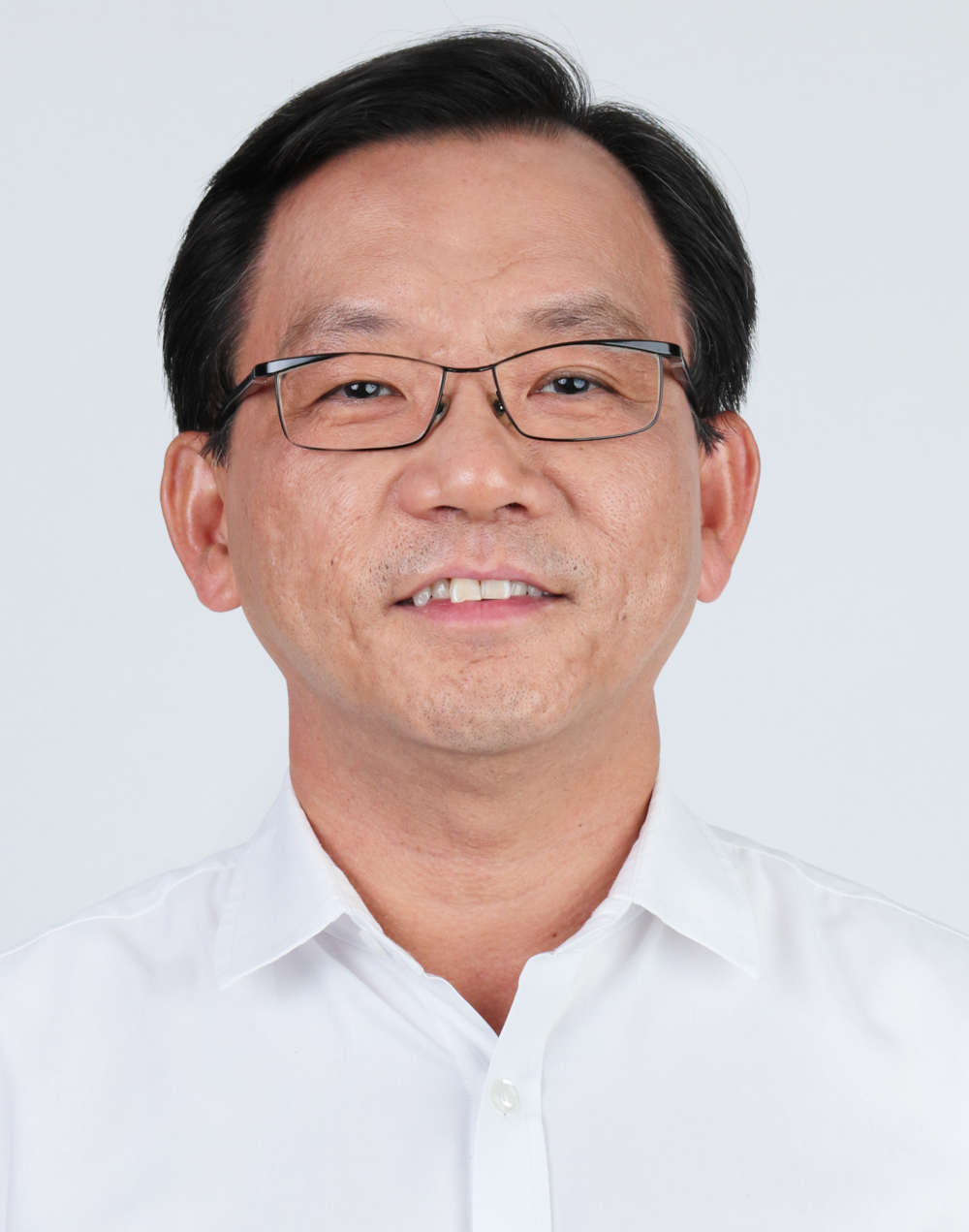
- Official portrait, 2021

Member of the Singapore Parliament for Bishan–Toa Payoh GRC
- In office 11 September 2015 – 15 April 2025
- Preceded by: PAP held
- Succeeded by: PAP held
- Majority: 2015: 55,465 (47.18%); 2020: 32,287 (34.46%)

Personal details
- Born: April 1966 (age 60) Singapore
- Other political affiliations: People's Action Party (2015—2025)
- Children: 4
- Occupation: Politician; accountant

Chong Kee Hiong (Chinese: 钟奇雄; pinyin: Zhōng Qíxiǒng; Jyutping: Zung1 Kei4 Hung4; Pe̍h-ōe-jī: Cheng Kî-hiông; born April 1966) is a Singaporean accountant and former politician who has been serving as the treasurer of the PAP Community Foundation since 2020. A former member of the governing People's Action Party (PAP), he was the Member of Parliament (MP), as part of different PAP teams, representing Bishan-Toa Payoh Group Representation Constituency (GRC) between 2015 and 2025.

== Education ==
Chong was educated at Raffles Institution and Raffles Junior College before he received a scholarship from KPMG to study at the National University of Singapore, from which he graduated with a Bachelor of Accountancy. As NUS' School of Accountancy was moved to the Nanyang Technological Institute in 1987, Chong is also considered an alumnus of NTU Singapore. He also completed an Advanced Management Program at the Harvard Business School in 2008.

== Career ==
Chong started his career in audit as a graduate assistant at KPMG in 1990.

Chong is the chief executive officer of Suntec Real Estate Investment Trust. He was the chairman of NTUC Foodfare. Before joining Suntec, Chong was the chief executive officer of OUE Hospitality REIT Management Pte Ltd. Prior to this, Chong was the chief executive officer of The Ascott. Earlier in his career, he was the chief financial officer of Raffles Holdings.

Chong is a member of the Institute of Singapore Chartered Accountants.

=== Political career ===
On 12 August 2015, the PAP announced Chong as part of a five-member PAP team contesting in Bishan–Toa Payoh GRC in the 2015 general election after Wong Kan Seng, Hri Kumar and Zainudin Nordin stepped down from their respective wards and politics. Chong was elected to Parliament when the PAP team won 73.59% of the electorate's valid votes. Chong was elected as a member of Parliament for Bishan–Toa Payoh GRC for a second term but as a four-member team in the 2020 general election after the PAP team garnered 67.26% of the valid votes. He was then appointed deputy chairman of the National Development Government Parliamentary Committee (GPC) in the 14th Parliament.

Chong was appointed as the vice-chairman of Bishan-Toa Payoh Town Council (BTPTC) since 2015 to 2025.

Prior to the 2025 general election, Chong announced his retirement from politics.

== Personal life ==
Chong grew up in a two-room Singapore Improvement Trust flat. He currently lives in a semi-detached house in Bishan East. Chong is the youngest of 11 siblings.

He is married to Monica, whom he met at KPMG, and they have four sons.

Parliament of Singapore
Preceded by Wong Kan Seng; Josephine Teo; Hri Kumar Nair; Ng Eng Hen; Zainudin Nordin	Member of Parliament for Bishan–Toa Payoh GRC; 2015–2025; Served alongside: (2015–2020): Chee Hong Tat, Josephine Teo, Ng Eng Hen, Saktiandi Supaat (2020–2025): Chee Hong Tat, Ng Eng Hen, Saktiandi Supaat	Succeeded by Cai Yinzhou; Chee Hong Tat; Elysa Chen; Saktiandi Supaat
