= Saktiandi Supaat =

Singaporean politician (born 1973)

The Honourable Saktiandi Supaat
- سقتيند سوڤات
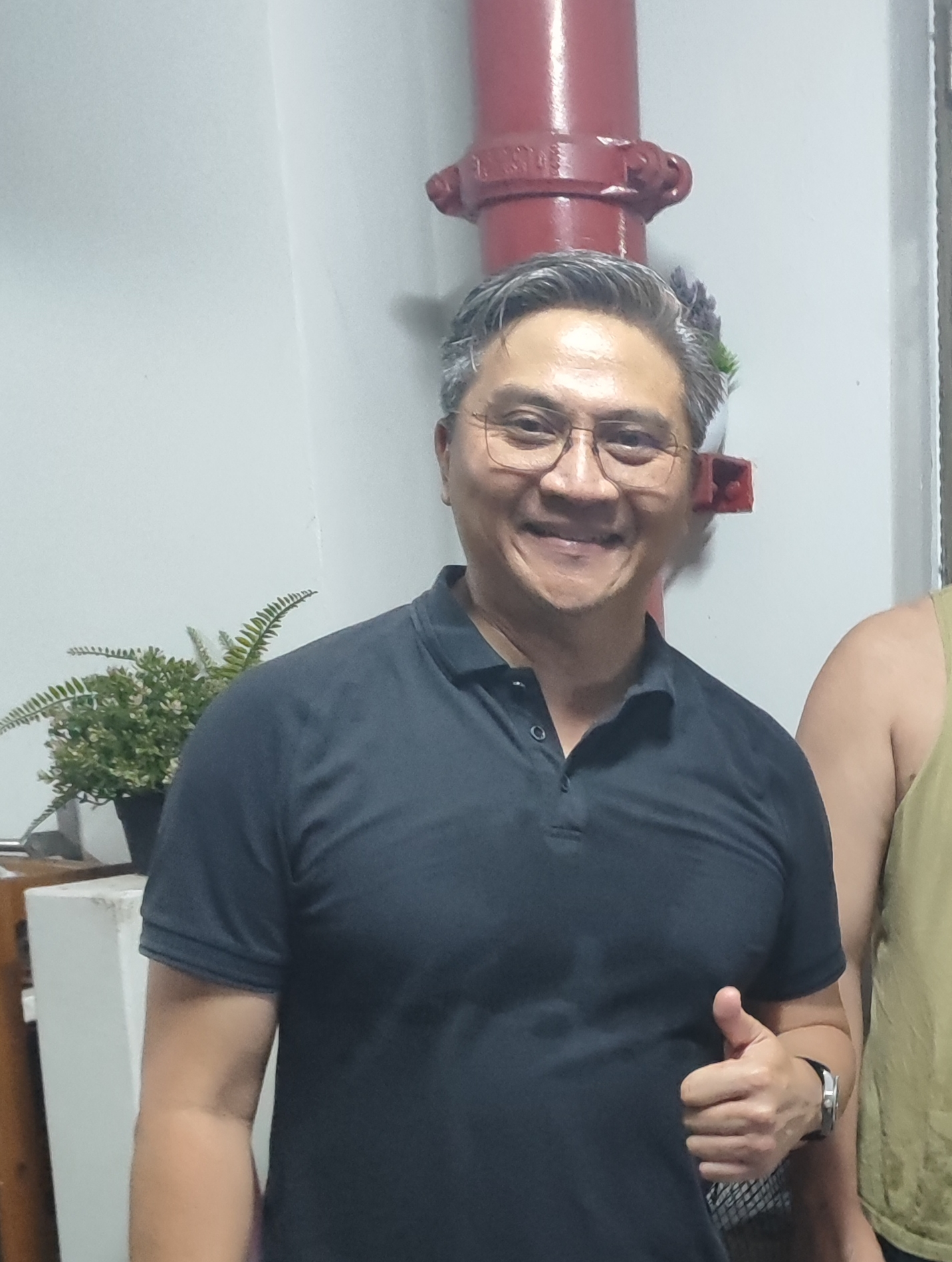
- Saktiandi in 2025

Member of the Singapore Parliament for Bishan-Toa Payoh GRC
- Incumbent
- Assumed office 11 September 2015
- Preceded by: PAP held
- Majority: 2015: 55,465 (47.18%); 2020: 32,287 (34.46%); 2025: 44,511 (50.36%)

Personal details
- Born: Saktiandi bin Supaat; 28 October 1973 (age 52) Singapore
- Party: People's Action Party
- Children: 3
- Education: University of Melbourne (BCom); National University of Singapore (MSS); University of Cambridge (MBA)
- Occupation: Politician; economist

Saktiandi bin Supaat (Note: Jawi: سقتيند بن سوڤات) (born 28 October 1973) is a Singaporean politician and economist. He is a member of People's Action Party (PAP). He was elected as a Member of Parliament (MP) representing the Toa Payoh East division of Bishan–Toa Payoh Group Representation Constituency since 2015.

== Education ==
Saktiandi attended Henry Park Primary School, Raffles Institution, and Catholic Junior College before graduating from the University of Melbourne with a Bachelor of Commerce with Honors degree and a Master of Social Sciences degree in applied economics from the National University of Singapore.

He subsequently completed a Master of Business Administration degree at the University of Cambridge under the Monetary Authority of Singapore Postgraduate Scholarship.

== Career ==
An economist by profession, Saktiandi is currently the Executive Vice President and Head of FX Research and Strategy team in Global Markets, Global Banking at Maybank.

=== Professional career ===
Prior to joining the private sector in 2010, Saktiandi was a lead economist in the Economic Policy Department of the Monetary Authority of Singapore. He spent over ten years there covering Singapore's financial strategy, macro-econometric modeling, foreign exchange markets, and Singapore dollar exchange rate policy.

Saktiandi joined the United Overseas Bank Group as vice president and Senior Treasury Economist in Global Markets and treasury-economic Research before moving to Maybank in 2011.

=== Political career ===
On 12 August 2015, the People's Action Party (PAP) announced Saktiandi as part of a five-member PAP team contesting in Bishan–Toa Payoh GRC in the 2015 general election after Wong Kan Seng, Hri Kumar, and Zainudin Nordin stepped down. Saktiandi was appointed as Bishan-Toa Payoh Town Council (BTPTC) in 2024. The PAP team won with 73.59% of the valid votes, electing Saktiandi to Parliament. Saktiandi and the PAP team were re-elected for a second term in the 2020 general election as a four-member team, garnering 67.26% of the valid votes. Saktiandi is part of the Government Parliamentary Committee for Finance, and Trade and Industry where he currently serves as its Chairman and Manpower where he serves as deputy chairman since 2025.

In the 14th Parliament, Saktiandi was appointed Chairman of the Transport Government Parliamentary Committee (GPC). He also serves on the Public Accounts Committee and chairs the inter-parliamentary relations group for the Middle East and Central Asia.

He has raised parliamentary questions on Singapore's public transport system, climate strategy, and economic outlook. He moved an Adjournment Motion in November 2019 on "Enhancing the Role of the Tripartite Alliance for Fair and Progressive Employment Practices (TAFEP) to Tackle Workplace and Job Discrimination", and another in October 2022 on "Helping Singaporeans Navigate a High-interest Rate Environment".

=== Community involvement ===
Saktiandi serves on the board of directors of the Tripartite Alliance for Fair and Progressive Employment Practices (TAFEP), and was previously on the Council of Advisors to the Education Services Union. He was a board director at Yayasan MENDAKI and currently serves as the vice chair of the Central Singapore Community Development Council (CDC). He is currently advisor to both the Union of power and gas employees (UPAGE), the Supply Chain Employees Union (SCEC) as well as the Singapore Transport Association (STA).

Between 2010 and 2013, he was the president of Young AMP and a board director of AMP (2011-2013), as well as the vice-chairman of the AMP. He also chaired the Malay/Muslim Community Leaders' Forum (CLF) Labs steering committee.

He previously served on the boards of SPRING Singapore and the Civil Service College and was a member of the REACH Supervisory Panel, the CPF Advisory Panel, the Charity Council, and the 2015 SEA Games steering committee.

== Personal life ==
Saktiandi is married and he has three children.

== Notes ==
Parliament of Singapore
Preceded by Wong Kan Seng; Josephine Teo; Hri Kumar Nair; Ng Eng Hen; Zainudin Nordin	Member of Parliament for Bishan–Toa Payoh GRC; 2015–present Served alongside: (2015–2020): Chee Hong Tat, Chong Kee Hiong, Josephine Teo and Ng Eng Hen (2020–2025): Chee Hong Tat, Chong Kee Hiong, and Ng Eng Hen (2025–present): Chee Hong Tat, Cai Yinzhou and Elysa Chen,	Incumbent
