= Toa Payoh Group Representation Constituency =

Group representation constituency in central Singapore

Toa Payoh
- Group Representation constituency for the Parliament of Singapore
- Region: Singapore

Current constituency
- Created: 1988
- Seats: 4
- Member: Constituency Abolished
- Replaced by: Bishan-Toa Payoh GRC

The Toa Payoh Group Representation Constituency was a group representation constituency (GRC) in central Singapore.

== History ==
During the 1988 Singaporean general election, Toa Payoh GRC was formed from merging Boon Teck, Khe Bong, Kuo Chuan and Toa Payoh Constituencies.

Kim Keat Single Member Constituency was absorbed in the 1991 elections. In 1997, the ward was merged along with Thomson GRC to form Bishan–Toa Payoh GRC.

Ong would resign in 1993 to contest in the Presidential Election and later become the 5th President of Singapore. After S. Dhanabalan retired from his cabinet position in 1994, it was one of the group representation constituencies without an anchor minister.

== Members of Parliament ==
Year	Division	Members of Parliament	Party
Formation
1988	Kuo Chuan; Boon Teck; Toa Payoh	Wong Kan Seng; Ho Tat Kin; Davinder Singh	PAP
1991	Kuo Chuan; Boon Teck; Toa Payoh; Kim Keat	S. Dhanabalan; Ho Tat Kin; Davinder Singh; Ong Teng Cheong (1991–1993) (Note: Resigned in August 1993 to contest the presidential election in the same year.)	PAP
Constituency abolished (1997)

== Electoral results ==
Note: The Elections Department does not include rejected votes when calculating the vote shares of candidates. Hence, all candidates' vote shares will total to 100% at any given election (may not appear so in multi-way contests due to rounding).

=== Elections in 1980s ===
General Election 1988
Party	Candidate	Votes	%
PAP	Wong Kan Seng; Ho Tat Kin; Davinder Singh	Unopposed	
Registered electors		49,243	
PAP win (new seat)			

=== Elections in 1990s ===
General Election 1991
Party	Candidate	Votes	%	±%
PAP	S. Dhanabalan; Ho Tat Kin; Davinder Singh; Ong Teng Cheong	Unopposed		
Registered electors		63,591		▲29.14
PAP hold				
