= Thomson Group Representation Constituency =

Historical constituency in Singapore

Thomson
- Former group representation constituency for the Parliament of Singapore
- Region: Singapore

Former constituency
- Created: 1991; 35 years ago
- Abolished: 1997; 29 years ago
- Seats: 4
- Party: People's Action Party
- Member: Constituency abolished
- Created from: Serangoon Gardens SMC; Thomson SMC
- Replaced by: Bishan–Toa Payoh GRC; Marine Parade GRC

Thomson Group Representation Constituency (GRC) was a defunct four-member group representation constituency that compromises of Bishan East, Serangoon Gardens, Bishan North and Thomson from 1991 to 1997. It merged parts of Thomson and Serangoon Gardens itself. Thomson GRC was led by Leong Horn Kee and Wong Kan Seng.

== History ==
The ward only exist for one term until 1997. Bishan and Thomson, along with Toa Payoh GRC, was merged to create Bishan–Toa Payoh GRC, while Serangoon Gardens was absorbed into three constituencies, namely Aljunied GRC, Ang Mo Kio GRC and Marine Parade GRC.

== Members of Parliament ==
Year	Division	Members of Parliament	Party
Formation
1991	Bishan East; Serangoon Gardens; Bishan North; Thomson	Wong Kan Seng; Lau Teik Soon; Ibrahim Othman; Leong Horn Kee	PAP
Constituency abolished (1997)

== Electoral results ==
Note: The Elections Department does not include rejected votes when calculating the vote shares of candidates. Hence, all candidates' vote shares will total to 100% at any given election (may not appear so in multi-way contests due to rounding).

=== Elections in 1990s ===
General Election 1991
Party	Candidate	Votes	%
PAP	Wong Kan Seng; Lau Teik Soon; Ibrahim Othman; Leong Horn Kee	Unopposed	
Registered electors		68,294	
