= Kuo Chuan Constituency =

Former electoral constituency in Singapore

Coordinates: 1.336°N 103.856°E

Kuo Chuan Constituency was a constituency in Singapore from 1972 to 1988. Kuo Chuan is home to the Toa Payoh west and the upcoming Bishan New Town, which has been developed since 1988. It was merged into Toa Payoh GRC.

== Member of Parliament ==
Election	Incumbent	Party
1972	P. Selvadurai	PAP
1976	P. Selvadurai	PAP
1980	P. Selvadurai	PAP
1984	Wong Kan Seng	PAP

== Electoral results ==
Note: The Elections Department does not include rejected votes when calculating the vote shares of candidates. Hence, all candidates' vote shares will total to 100% at any given election (may not appear so in multi-way contests due to rounding).

=== Elections in 1970s ===
General Election 1972: Kuo Chuan
Party	Candidate	Votes	%
PAP	P. Selvadurai	10,523	73.69
BS	P. Mano	3,757	26.31

General Election 1976: Kuo Chuan
Party	Candidate	Votes	%
PAP	P. Selvadurai	11,931	74.42
BS	Ng Ah Chue	4,043	25.58

=== Elections in 1980s ===
General Election 1980: Kuo Chuan
Party	Candidate	Votes	%
PAP	P. Selvadurai	12,378	75.92
BS	Sim Chit Giak	3,925	24.08

General Election 1984: Kuo Chuan
Party	Candidate	Votes	%
PAP	Wong Kan Seng	11,162	64.55
BS	Sim Chit Giak	6,129	35.45
