= Supply Act =

Supply Act is a stock short title used for legislation in a number of countries and may refer to:

- Supply Act (Singapore)
- Supply Act (Australia)
- Supply Act (Ontario, Canada)
