= Supply Act (Australia) =

Supply Act (No. 1) 2016‑2017

Parliament of Australia
- Citation: Supply Act (No. 1) 2016‑2017 (Cth)
- Enacted by: House of Representatives
- Enacted by: Senate
- Royal assent: 4 May 2016
- Status: In force

The Supply Act (No. 1) 2016–2017 is an Act of the Parliament of Australia that appropriates money out of the Consolidated Revenue Fund for the ordinary annual services of the Government.
