= Pre-election day events of the 2011 Singaporean general election =

These are the events concerning the 2011 Singaporean general election which occurred before the polling day on 7 May 2011.

== Nomination ==
=== New candidates ===
A total of 78 candidates were brand-new to this election, among which 54 were from six participating opposition parties and 24 were from the ruling People's Action Party.

Name	Age	Occupation	Party	Contested Constituency
Ang Hin Kee	45	Chief executive, NTUC e2i	PAP	Ang Mo Kio GRC
Ang Wei Neng	44	Vice-president, SBS Transit West District	PAP	Jurong GRC
Ang Yong Guan	56	Consultant Psychiatrist, Paragon Medical	SDP	Holland–Bukit Timah GRC
Chan Chun Sing	42	Former Singapore Army Chief	PAP	Tanjong Pagar GRC
Frieda Chan Sio Phing	35	Senior Medical social worker	WP	Moulmein–Kallang GRC
Chen Show Mao	50	Corporate Lawyer and former Infantry Commander	WP	Aljunied GRC
Chia Shi-Lu	40	Orthopedic Surgeon, Singapore General Hospital	PAP	Tanjong Pagar GRC
Watson Chong Cham Weng	51	Managing director	WP	Nee Soon GRC
Jeanette Florina Chong-Aruldoss Yean Yoong	48	Lawyer, Allen & Gledhill	NSP	Mountbatten SMC
Desmond Choo Pey Ching	33	Deputy Director, NTUC's Youth Development and Executive Secretary, Union of Security Employees, Nephew of former MP Choo Wee Khiang	PAP	Hougang SMC
Foo Mee Har	45	Banker, Standard Chartered	PAP	West Coast GRC
Gan Thiam Poh	48	Banker, DBS Bank	PAP	Pasir Ris–Punggol GRC
Gerald Giam Yean Song	33	Senior IT Consultant, Avanade	WP	East Coast GRC
Gilbert Goh Keow Wah	49	Activist	NSP	Tampines GRC
Harminder Pal Singh Gurcharan Singh	39	Speaker	SDA	Pasir Ris–Punggol GRC
Heng Swee Keat	50	Former Managing Director, Monetary Authority of Singapore	PAP	Tampines GRC
Haren Hu Soak Harn	29	Marketing manager	RP	West Coast GRC
Intan Azura Mokhtar	35	Trainer, National Institute of Education	PAP	Ang Mo Kio GRC
Janil Arusha Puthucheary	39	Surgeon, KK Women's and Children's Hospital	PAP	Pasir Ris–Punggol GRC
Jesilan Sivalingam	41	Process Manager	NSP	Chua Chu Kang GRC
Kenneth Andrew Jeyaretnam	52	Hedge Fund Manager; son of founder and late WP-Secretary General J. B. Jeyaretnam	RP	West Coast GRC
Koh Choong Yong	38	Technology Consultant, Ruckus Wireless Singapore	WP	Sengkang West SMC
Kumar Appavoo	43	Businessman	RP	West Coast GRC
L. Somasundram	47	Lecturer, Temasek Polytechnic	WP	Moulmein–Kallang GRC
Michelle Lee Juen	35	Private Lecturer	SDP	Holland–Bukit Timah GRC
Lee Li Lian	32	Senior Sales Trainer, Great Eastern Life Assurance	WP	Punggol East SMC
Lee Song Juan	65	Image Consultant	SDA	Pasir Ris–Punggol GRC
Desmond Lee Ti-Seng	35	Legal Counsel, Temasek Holdings; son of former cabinet minister Lee Yock Suan	PAP	Jurong GRC
Lee Yeong Wee	35	Firm Owner	SPP	Bishan–Toa Payoh GRC
Wilfred Leung Wei Lit	36	Design Manager	SPP	Bishan–Toa Payoh GRC
Jeffery Lim Pey Yong	35	Senior Analyst	SDA	Pasir Ris–Punggol GRC
Lim Zirui	24	Student	RP	Ang Mo Kio GRC
Lina Loh Woon Lee	62	Former nurse; wife of Chiam See Tong	SPP	Potong Pasir SMC
Frankie Low Chiak Huan	51	Businessman	RP	West Coast GRC
Low Yen Ling	37	Former Director, Economic Development Board	PAP	Chua Chu Kang GRC
Jarrod Luo Jie	26	Entrepreneur	SDP	Sembawang GRC
Mohamed Fazli Talip	29	Finance Adviser	WP	East Coast GRC
Muhamad Faisal Bin Abdul Manap	35	Former freelance counselor and technical officer in Housing and Development Board	WP	Aljunied GRC
Muhhamad Shafni Ahmad	33	Marketing Executive	SDA	Pasir Ris–Punggol GRC
Spencer Ng Chun Hon	31	Company Director	NSP	Marine Parade GRC
Nor Lella Mardiiiah Mohamed	37	Business Consultant	NSP	Chua Chu Kang GRC
Noriani Yunus	42	Telemarketer	NSP	Jurong GRC
David Ong Kim Huat	49	Managing director, RedDot Publishing	PAP	Jurong GRC
Ong Teng Koon	34	Commodities Trader; son of retiring MP Ong Ah Heng	PAP	Sembawang GRC
Ong Ye Kung	42	Assistant Secretary-General, NTUC, Chairman and Executive Secretary; son of former Barisan Sosialis MP Ong Lian Ten	PAP	Aljunied GRC
Angela Oon Kheng Faye	32	Researcher	WP	Nee Soon GRC
Osman Khan Sulaiman	36	Human Resource Supervisor	RP	Ang Mo Kio GRC
Hazel Poh Koon Koon	41	Managing director and civilist; wife of Tony Tan Lay Thiam	NSP	Chua Chu Kang GRC
Png Eng Huat	49	Independent Company Director	WP	East Coast GRC
Pritam Singh Khaira	34	SMU Law postgraduate and former Singapore Army Officer	WP	Aljunied GRC
Benjamin Pwee Yek Guan	43	Former civil servant, business development strategist and consultant	SPP	Bishan–Toa Payoh GRC
Raymond Lim Peng Ann	27	Activist	NSP	Tampines GRC
Nicole Rebecca Seah Xue Ling	24	Activist and Advertising Executive, Starcom MediaVest Group	NSP	Marine Parade GRC
Sadasivam Veriyah	58	Former teacher and unionist	SDP	Sembawang GRC
Sajeev Kunju Raman Kamalasanan	41	Businessman	WP	Nee Soon GRC
Sidney Soon Seng Kay	54	Businessman	SDA	Pasir Ris–Punggol GRC
Sim Ann	36	Director, National Population Secretariat	PAP	Holland–Bukit Timah GRC
Syafarin Sarif	35	Project Manager	NSP	Tampines GRC
Tan Chuan-Jin	42	Former Singapore Army Officer	PAP	Marine Parade GRC
Tan Jee Say	57	Investment Adviser and former Principal Private Secretary to Goh Chok Tong	SDP	Holland–Bukit Timah GRC
Tony Tan Keng Hong	34	Firm Owner	SDA	Pasir Ris–Punggol GRC
Tony Tan Lay Thiam	41	Chief executive; husband of Hazel Poa Koon Koon	NSP	Chua Chu Kang GRC
John Tan Liang Joo	49	Social Psychologist	SDP	Sembawang GRC
Alex Tan Zhi Xiang	23	Activist and Financial Advisor	RP (SPP)	Ang Mo Kio GRC
Patrick Tay Teck Guan	40	Trade Unionist and executive secretary of the Healthcare Services Employees' Union	PAP	Nee Soon GRC
Teo Soh Lung	62	Former Lawyer	SDP	Yuhua SMC
Tin Pei Ling	27	Business Consultant, Ernst & Young	PAP	Marine Parade GRC
Toh Hong Boon	30	Senior Research Officer	WP	Moulmein–Kallang GRC
Alec Tok Kim Yam	46	Artistic Director, One Kind Theatre LLC	SDP	Bukit Panjang SMC
Edwin Charles Tong Chun Fai	42	Lawyer, Allen & Gledhill	PAP	Moulmein–Kallang GRC
Vigneswari Ramachandran	29	Pre-School Teacher	RP	Ang Mo Kio GRC
Vikram Nair	33	Lawyer, Norton Rose Fulbright	PAP	Sembawang GRC
Vincent Rene Wijeysingha	41	Executive Director, Transient Workers Count Too (TWC2)	SDP	Holland–Bukit Timah GRC
Lawrence Wong Shyun Tsai	39	Chief executive, Energy Market Authority	PAP	West Coast GRC
John Yam Poh Nan	49	Business Consultant	WP	Nee Soon GRC
Alex Yam Ziming	30	NTUC Activist	PAP	Chua Chu Kang GRC
Yee Jenn Jong	46	Entrepreneur and Founder, The Learning Grid and 360 Education	WP	Joo Chiat SMC
Ivan Yeo Tiong Boon	63	Managing director	NSP	Marine Parade GRC
Zainal Sapari	46	Educator and Former Pasir Ris School Superintendent	PAP	Pasir Ris–Punggol GRC
Andy Zhu Lai Cheng	29	Firm Manager	RP	West Coast GRC

=== Outgoing politicians ===
The list of outgoing politicians who were either deceased, retiring or stepping down from their seats were from the PAP.

Deceased
Name	Constituency (Division)	Current Portfolio	Date of Death	Remarks
Balaji Sadasivan	Ang Mo Kio GRC (Cheng San-Seletar)	Senior Minister of State (Foreign Affairs)	27 September 2010	
Ong Chit Chung	Jurong GRC (Bukit Batok)	Member of Parliament	14 July 2008	Halimah Yacob substituted Ong's duties until end of term.
Retiring
Name	Constituency (Division)	Current Portfolio	Date Announced	Remarks
Abdullah Tarmugi	East Coast GRC (Siglap)	7th Speaker of Parliament/Former Cabinet Minister	24 March 2011	
Ahmad Magad	Pasir Ris–Punggol GRC (Pasir Ris East)	Member of Parliament	23 March 2011	
Ang Mong Seng	Hong Kah GRC (Bukit Gombak)	Member of Parliament	23 March 2011	Constituency was dissolved and become Chua Chu Kang GRC, while retaining the division.
Chan Soo Sen	Joo Chiat SMC	Former minister of State	23 March 2011	
Madeleine Ho	West Coast GRC (Boon Lay)	Member of Parliament	2 April 2011	
Ho Peng Kee	Nee Soon East SMC	Minister of State (Law and Home Affairs)	31 March 2011	Ward was absorbed into the new Nee Soon GRC.
Koo Tsai Kee	Tanjong Pagar GRC (Tiong Bahru)	Senior Minister of State (Defence)	30 March 2011	Ward was merged with the nearby Tanjong Pagar division of the same ward to form Tanjong Pagar-Tiong Bahru.
Lee Boon Yang	Jalan Besar GRC (Jalan Besar)	Former Cabinet Minister	1 October 2010	Constituency was dissolved and become Moulmein–Kallang GRC, while retaining the division.
Lim Boon Heng	Jurong GRC (Jurong Central)	Former Cabinet Minister/PAP Chairman	10 April 2011	Ward was split into Jurong Central and the new Jurong Spring ward; also relinquished his PAP Chairman portfolio as well.
Ong Ah Heng	Nee Soon Central SMC	Member of Parliament	30 March 2011	Ward was absorbed into the new Nee Soon GRC; his son, Ong Teng Koon, would contest in Sembawang GRC.
Ong Kian Min	Tampines GRC (Tampines North)	Member of Parliament	23 March 2011	
Ong Seh Hong	Marine Parade GRC (Kampong Ubi-Kembangan)	Member of Parliament	23 March 2011	Ward was absorbed with portions of Kaki Bukit (which was absorbed to Aljunied GRC) and Kampong Chai Chee (from East Coast GRC) to form Kembangan-Chai Chee.
S Jayakumar	East Coast GRC (Bedok)	Senior Minister/Former Deputy Prime Minister	24 March 2011	First tendered resignation in 2009 for health reasons.
Sin Boon Ann	Tampines GRC (Tampines Central)	Member of Parliament	3 April 2011	Would continue to serve as second advisor for this ward in 2016.
Wee Siew Kim	Ang Mo Kio GRC (Jalan Kayu)	Member of Parliament	10 April 2011	
Matthias Yao	MacPherson SMC	Mayor (South East CDC)/Deputy Speaker	23 March 2011	Ward was absorbed into the nearby Marine Parade GRC.
Yu-Foo Yee Shoon	Holland–Bukit Timah GRC (Bukit Timah)	Minister of State (Community Development, Youth and Sports)	10 April 2011	
Yeo Cheow Tong	Hong Kah GRC (Yew Tee)	Former Cabinet Minister	30 December 2009	Constituency was dissolved and become Chua Chu Kang GRC, while retaining the division.

=== Staking claims ===
Soon after the announcement of the new electoral boundaries, various opposition parties indicated their intent to contest, subject to negotiations between political parties to avoid three-cornered fights. The parties declaring an interest to contest each constituency and their nomination status is reflected below.

Nominations by various opposition parties as on nomination day on 27 April 2011. Banded shading indicates constituencies with three-party contests. There was no contest in Tanjong Pagar after the opposition team intending to submit a nomination were disqualified.

==== Group Representation Constituencies ====
Announced candidates of Singapore general election, 2011
Division	Seats	Voters	Political Party	Candidate(s)	Nomination status	Notes
Aljunied GRC	5	143,148	People's Action Party	George Yeo; Lim Hwee Hua; Zainul Abidin bin Mohamed Rasheed; Cynthia Phua; Ong Ye Kung	Nominated	Ong Ye Kung was a new candidate, while the rest were incumbents.
Aljunied GRC	5	143,148	Workers' Party	Low Thia Khiang; Lim Swee Lian Sylvia; Chen Show Mao; Pritam Singh; Muhamad Faisal Manap	Nominated	Low Thia Khiang was an incumbent in Hougang SMC, Sylvia Lim contested Aljunied GRC in 2006, while the rest were new candidates.
Ang Mo Kio GRC	6	179,071	People's Action Party	Lee Hsien Loong; Yeo Guat Kwang; Inderjit Singh; Seng Han Thong; Ang Hin Kee; Intan Azura Mokhtar	Nominated	Yeo Guat Kwang and Seng Han Thong were respective incumbents from Aljunied GRC and the then-Yio Chu Kang SMC in 2006, Ang Hin Kee and Intan Azura Mokhtar were new candidates, while Lee Hsien Loong and Inderjit Singh were incumbents.
Ang Mo Kio GRC	6	179,071	Reform Party	Alex Tan Zhixiang; Arthero Lim Tung Hee; Vignes Ramachandran; Lim Zi Rui; Mansor Rahman; Osman Sulaiman	Nominated	Alex Tan, was from the SPP, said that he wanted SPP to contest the GRC. Arthero Lim and Mansor Rahman had contested before (Lim was under the SDA-banner, Rahman previously contested in 1984 under the Singapore United Front banner (now called Democratic Progressive Party)), while the rest were new candidates.
Ang Mo Kio GRC	6	179,071	Singapore Democratic Party	NA	Expressed interest, but has withdrawn	In favour of RP
Ang Mo Kio GRC	6	179,071	Singapore People's Party	Alex Tan Zhi Xiang; Others unannounced	Withdrew interest	In favour of RP
Bishan–Toa Payoh GRC	5	122,492	People's Action Party	Wong Kan Seng; Ng Eng Hen; Josephine Teo Li Min; Hri Kumar; Zainudin Nordin	Nominated	All five candidates from the team were incumbents.
Bishan–Toa Payoh GRC	5	122,492	Singapore People's Party	Chiam See Tong; Benjamin Pwee; Wilfred Leung; Jimmy Lee; Mohamad Hamim Aliyas	Nominated	Chiam See Tong was an incumbent in Potong Pasir SMC, Mohamad Hamim Aliyas contested Pasir Ris–Punggol GRC in 2006, while the rest were new candidates.
Bishan–Toa Payoh GRC	5	122,492	Reform Party	NA	Withdrew interest	In favour of SPP
Bishan–Toa Payoh GRC	5	122,492	Singapore Democratic Alliance	NA	Withdrawn	In favour of SPP
Bishan–Toa Payoh GRC	5	122,492	Singapore Democratic Party	NA	Expressed interest, but has withdrawn	In favour of SPP
Bishan–Toa Payoh GRC	5	122,492	Socialist Front	NA	Withdrew from elections	
Chua Chu Kang GRC	5	158,648	National Solidarity Party	Teo Kway Huang Sebastian; Tan Lay Thiam Tony; Poa Koon Koon Hazel; Nor Lella Mardiiiah Mohamed; Jeisilan Sivalingam	Nominated	Sebastian Teo contested Jalan Besar GRC in 2006 (under the SDA banner), while the rest were new candidates.
Chua Chu Kang GRC	5	158,648	People's Action Party	Gan Kim Yong; Alvin Yeo; Zaqy Mohamad; Alex Yam; Low Yen Ling	Nominated	Alex Yam and Low Yen Ling were new candidates, while the rest were incumbents from the then-Hong Kah GRC.
Chua Chu Kang GRC	5	158,648	Reform Party	NA	Withdrew interest	In favour of NSP
East Coast GRC	5	120,324	People's Action Party	Lim Swee Say; Maliki Osman; Lee Yi Shyan; Jessica Tan; Raymond Lim	Nominated	Lim Swee Say and Maliki Osman were from Holland–Bukit Timah GRC and Sembawang GRC, respectively, while the rest were incumbents.
East Coast GRC	5	120,324	Workers' Party	Eric Tan Heng Chong; Png Eng Huat; Glenda Han; Gerald Giam; Mohamed Fazli Bin Talip	Nominated	Eric Tan and Glenda Han contested before in 2006 (the latter contested at Ang Mo Kio GRC), while the rest were new candidates.
Holland–Bukit Timah GRC	4	91,607	People's Action Party	Vivian Balakrishnan; Christopher de Souza; Liang Eng Hwa; Sim Ann	Nominated	Sim Ann was a new candidate, while the rest were incumbents.
Holland–Bukit Timah GRC	4	91,607	Singapore Democratic Party	Tan Jee Say; Ang Yong Guan; Vincent Wijeysingha; Michelle Lee	Nominated	All four candidates from the team were new candidates.
Jurong GRC	5	125,276	National Solidarity Party	Neo Ting Wei Christopher; Abdul Rasheed; Ong Beng Soon Elvin; Ong Hock Siong; Noraini Yunus	Nominated	Noraini Yunus was a new candidate, while the rest had contested before.
Jurong GRC	5	125,276	People's Action Party	Tharman Shanmugaratnam; Halimah Bte Yacob; Ang Wei Neng; Desmond Lee; David Ong	Nominated	Tharman Shanmugaratnam and Halimah Yacob were incumbents, while the rest were new candidates.
Jurong GRC	5	125,276	Reform Party	NA	Withdrew interest	In favour of NSP
Marine Parade GRC	5	154,451	National Solidarity Party	Cheo Chai Chen; Ivan Yeo Tiong Boon; Abdul Salim Harun; Spencer Ng Chung Hon; Nicole Rebecca Seah Xue Ling	Nominated	Cheo Chai Chen was a former MP from 1991 to 1997, Abdul Salim Harun previously contested Ang Mo Kio GRC in 2006 (under the WP banner), while the rest were new candidates.
Marine Parade GRC	5	154,451	People's Action Party	Goh Chok Tong; Tan Chuan Jin; Fatimah Lateef; Seah Kian Peng; Tin Pei Ling	Nominated	Tan Chuan Jin and Tin Pei Ling were new candidates, while the rest were incumbents.
Marine Parade GRC	5	154,451	Democratic Progressive Party	NA	Withdrew from elections	Did not appear on nomination day and probably in favour of NSP
Moulmein–Kallang GRC	4	87,595	People's Action Party	Lui Tuck Yew; Yaacob Ibrahim; Denise Phua Lay Peng; Edwin Tong	Nominated	Edwin Tong was a new candidate, Lui Tuck Yew was an incumbent from Tanjong Pagar GRC, while the rest were incumbents from then-Jalan Besar GRC ward.
Moulmein–Kallang GRC	4	87,595	Workers' Party	Mohd Rahizan Yaacob; Toh Hong Boon; L Somasundram; Freida Chan	Nominated	Mohd Rahizan Yaacob contested Aljunied in 2006, while the rest were new candidates.
Moulmein–Kallang GRC	4	87,595	National Solidarity Party	NA	Withdrew interest	In favour of WP
Nee Soon GRC	5	148,290	People's Action Party	K Shanmugam; Muhammad Faishal Ibrahim; Lee Bee Wah; Lim Wee Kiak; Patrick Tay Teck Guan	Nominated	Patrick Tay was a new candidate, Muhammad Faishal Ibrahim was from Marine Parade GRC, Lee Bee Wah was an incumbent from Ang Mo Kio GRC, while the rest were incumbents from Sembawang GRC.
Nee Soon GRC	5	148,290	Workers' Party	John Yam; Angela Oon; Sajeev; Watson Chong; Poh Lee Guan	Nominated	Poh Lee Guan contested Nee Soon East in 2006, while the rest were new candidates.
Pasir Ris–Punggol GRC	6	168,971	People's Action Party	Teo Chee Hean; Teo Ser Luck; Penny Low; Janil Puthucheary; Gan Thiam Poh; Zainal bin Sapari	Nominated	Janil Puthucheary, Gan Thiam Poh and Zainal Bin Sapari were new candidates, while Teo Chee Hean, Teo Ser Luck and Penny Low were incumbents.
Pasir Ris–Punggol GRC	6	168,971	Singapore Democratic Alliance	Harminder Pal Singh; Sidney Soon; Jeffrey Lim; Noraine Anabi; Tony Tan Keng Hong; Mohammad Shafni Ahmad	Nominated	All six candidates from the team were new candidates.
Pasir Ris–Punggol GRC	6	168,971	Workers' Party	NA	Expressed interest, but has withdrawn	In favour of SDA
Sembawang GRC	5	142,459	People's Action Party	Khaw Boon Wan; Ellen Lee; Hawazi Daipi; Ong Teng Koon; Vikram Nair	Nominated	Ong Teng Koon and Vikram Nair were new candidates, while the rest were incumbents.
Sembawang GRC	5	142,459	Singapore Democratic Party	James Gomez; John Tan; Jarrod Luo Jie; Mohd Isa Abdul Aziz; Sadasivam Veriyah	Nominated	James Gomez and Mohd Isa Abdul Aziz contested before in 2006 (the former under the WP banner), while the rest were new candidates.
Tampines GRC	5	137,532	National Solidarity Party	Goh Meng Seng; Reno Fong Chin Leong; Syafarin Sarif; Raymond Lim Peng Ann; Gilbert Goh	Nominated	Goh Meng Seng and Reno Fong contested before in 2006 (under the WP and SDA banners, respectively), while the rest were new candidates.
Tampines GRC	5	137,532	People's Action Party	Mah Bow Tan; Ng Phek Hoong Irene; Masagos Zulkifli Bin Masagos Mohamad; Baey Yam Keng; Heng Swee Keat	Nominated	Heng Swee Keat was a new candidate, Baey Yam Keng replaced Steve Tan Peng Hoe on nomination day when the latter pulled out for "personal reasons", while the rest were incumbents.
Tanjong Pagar GRC	5	139,771	People's Action Party	Lee Kuan Yew; Lily Neo; Chia Shi-Lu; Indranee Thurai Rajah; Chan Chun Sing	Uncontested Walkover	Lily Neo was an incumbent from the then-Jalan Besar GRC, Lee Kuan Yew and Indranee Thurai Rajah were incumbents, while Chan Chun Sing and Chia Shi-Lu were new candidates, the latter replaced Baey Yam Keng on nomination day.
Tanjong Pagar GRC	5	139,771	Democratic Progressive Party	NA	Expressed interest, but has withdrawn	Did not appear on nomination day.
Tanjong Pagar GRC	5	139,771	Independents	Ng Teck Siong; Lim Mie; Ng Pian Ying; Abdullah Salam; Nazem Suki	Disqualified by the Elections Department	Submitted nomination forms 35 seconds late
West Coast GRC	5	121,045	People's Action Party	Lim Hng Kiang; Fong Jen Arthur; S Iswaran; Foo Mee Har; Lawrence Wong Shyun Tsai	Nominated	Foo Mee Har and Lawrence Wong were new candidates, while the rest were incumbents.
West Coast GRC	5	121,045	Reform Party	Kenneth Jeyaretnam; Frankie Low; Andy Zhu; Kumar Appavoo; Haren Hu	Nominated	All five candidates from the team were new candidates.

==== Single Member Constituencies ====
Announced candidates of Singapore general election, 2011
Division	Seats	Voters	Political Party	Candidate(s)	Nomination status	Notes
Bukit Panjang SMC	1	33,053	People's Action Party	Teo Ho Pin	Nominated	Incumbent
Bukit Panjang SMC	1	33,053	Singapore Democratic Party	Alec Tok	Nominated	New Candidate
Hong Kah North SMC	1	27,701	People's Action Party	Amy Khor Lean Suan	Nominated	Incumbent for Hong Kah North ward which was part of Hong Kah GRC
Hong Kah North SMC	1	27,701	Reform Party	NA	Withdrew interest	In favour of SPP
Hong Kah North SMC	1	27,701	Singapore People's Party	Sin Kek Tong	Nominated	
Hougang SMC	1	24,560	People's Action Party	Desmond Choo Pey Ching	Nominated	New Candidate, replacing Eric Low who retired before the elections
Hougang SMC	1	24,560	Workers' Party	Yaw Shin Leong	Nominated	Contested in Ang Mo Kio in 2006, replacing incumbent Low Thia Khiang who contested in Aljunied GRC
Joo Chiat SMC	1	22,069	Independent	Andrew Kuan	Withdrew interest	In favour of WP
Joo Chiat SMC	1	22,069	People's Action Party	Charles Chong	Nominated	Was from Pasir Ris–Punggol GRC, replacing incumbent Chan Soo Sen who retired before the elections
Joo Chiat SMC	1	22,069	Workers' Party	Yee Jenn Jong	Nominated	New Candidate
Mountbatten SMC	1	23,731	National Solidarity Party	Jeannette Chong-Aruldoss	Nominated	New Candidate
Mountbatten SMC	1	23,731	People's Action Party	Lim Biow Chuan	Nominated	Incumbent for Mountbatten ward which was part of Marine Parade GRC
Mountbatten SMC	1	23,731	Singapore Democratic Alliance	NA	Withdrew interest	In favour of NSP
Mountbatten SMC	1	23,731	Socialist Front	NA	Withdrew from elections	
Mountbatten SMC	1	23,731	Independent	Kannappan Chettiar	Withdrew from elections	In favour of NSP
Mountbatten SMC	1	23,731	Independent	Boon Suan Ban	Withdrew from elections	Did not submit political donation form on time
Mountbatten SMC	1	23,731	Independent	Zeng Guo Yuan	Withdrew from elections	Tore up nomination papers on nomination day
Pioneer SMC	1	25,745	National Solidarity Party	Steve Chia Kiah Hong	Nominated	
Pioneer SMC	1	25,745	People's Action Party	Cedric Foo	Nominated	Incumbent for Pioneer ward which was part of West Coast GRC
Pioneer SMC	1	25,745	Reform Party	NA	Withdrew interest	In favour of NSP
Potong Pasir SMC	1	17,327	Singapore People's Party	Lina Chiam	Nominated	Incumbent Chiam See Tong's wife, the former contesting in Bishan–Toa Payoh GRC
Potong Pasir SMC	1	17,327	People's Action Party	Sitoh Yih Pin	Nominated	
Punggol East SMC	1	33,281	People's Action Party	Michael Palmer	Nominated	Incumbent for Punggol East ward which was part of Pasir Ris–Punggol GRC
Punggol East SMC	1	33,281	Singapore Democratic Alliance	Desmond Lim	Nominated	
Punggol East SMC	1	33,281	Workers' Party	Lee Li Lian	Nominated	New Candidate
Radin Mas SMC	1	31,014	National Solidarity Party	Yip Yew Weng	Nominated	
Radin Mas SMC	1	31,014	People's Action Party	Sam Tan Chin Siong	Nominated	Incumbent for Radin Mas ward which was part of Tanjong Pagar GRC
Radin Mas SMC	1	31,014	Reform Party	NA	Withdrew interest	In favour of NSP/SDA
Radin Mas SMC	1	31,014	Singapore Democratic Alliance	Mohd Nazem Suki	Announced candidate withdrawn	In favour of NSP
Radin Mas SMC	1	31,014	Socialist Front	NA	Withdrew from elections	
Sengkang West SMC	1	26,882	People's Action Party	Lam Pin Min	Nominated	Incumbent for Sengkang West ward which was part of Ang Mo Kio GRC
Sengkang West SMC	1	26,882	People's Liberal Democratic Party	Ooi Boon Ewe	Withdrew from elections	Unable to get his assentors on the nomination day
Sengkang West SMC	1	26,882	Singapore Democratic Alliance	Ismail Yaacob	Announced candidate withdrawn	In favour of WP
Sengkang West SMC	1	26,882	Workers' Party	Koh Choong Yong	Nominated	New Candidate
Whampoa SMC	1	21,631	National Solidarity Party	Ken Sun	Nominated	
Whampoa SMC	1	21,631	People's Action Party	Heng Chee How	Nominated	Incumbent for Whampoa ward which was part of Jalan Besar GRC
Whampoa SMC	1	21,631	Singapore Democratic Party	NA	Withdrew interest	In favour of NSP
Whampoa SMC	1	21,631	Workers' Party	NA	Withdrew interest	In favour of NSP
Yuhua SMC	1	23,199	National Solidarity Party	NA	Withdrew interest	In favour of SDP
Yuhua SMC	1	23,199	People's Action Party	Grace Fu	Nominated	Incumbent for Yuhua ward which was part of Jurong GRC
Yuhua SMC	1	23,199	Reform Party	NA	Withdrew interest	In favour of SDP
Yuhua SMC	1	23,199	Singapore Democratic Party	Teo Soh Lung	Nominated	New Candidate
