= Victor Lye =

Singaporean politician (born 1962)

The Honourable Victor Lye BBM
- 赖添发
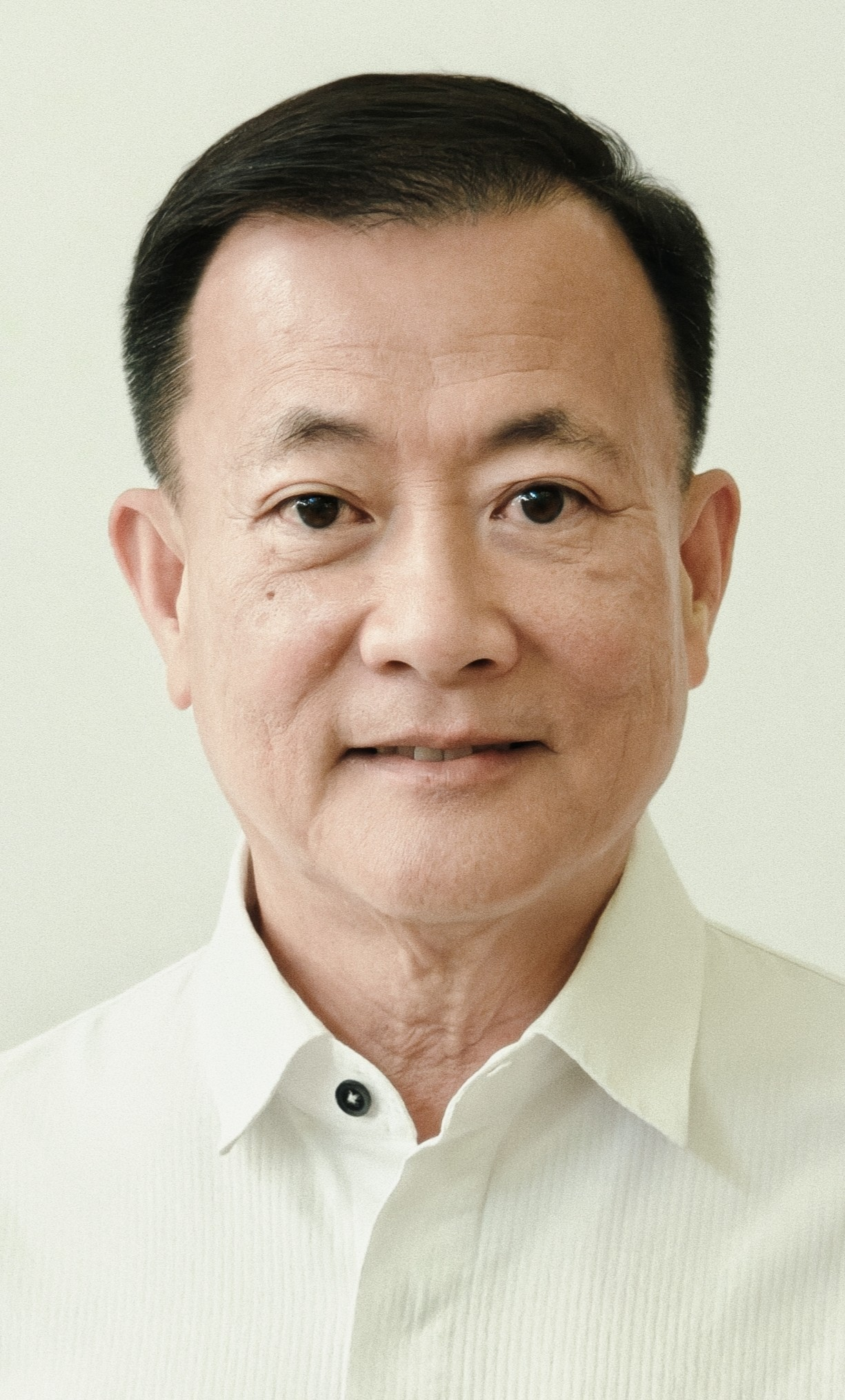
- Official portrait, 2025

Member of the Singapore Parliament for Ang Mo Kio GRC
- Incumbent
- Assumed office 3 May 2025
- Preceded by: PAP held
- Majority: 99,688 (68.10%)

Personal details
- Born: Joseph Victor Lye Thiam Fatt; 1962 (age 63–64) Singapore
- Party: People's Action Party
- Children: 2
- Education: University of Adelaide

Joseph Victor Lye Thiam Fatt (Note: Chinese: 赖添发; Pha̍k-fa-sṳ: Lai Thiâm-fat; pinyin: Lài Tiānfā) (born 1962) is a Singaporean politician. A member of the governing People's Action Party (PAP), he has been the Member of Parliament (MP) for the Buangkok–Fernvale South division of Ang Mo Kio Group Representation Constituency (GRC) since 2025.

== Early life and education ==
Lye was born in 1962 to a with 4 siblings. His family lived in a rental unit in Ang Mo Kio until they were allotted a public housing unit.

Lye studied at St Joseph's Institution and was active in the alumni organising leadership talks. A Colombo Plan Scholar, Lye achieved a first class honours in Economics at the University of Adelaide.

== Career ==
Lye began his career in 1987 as an Administrative Officer in the Ministry of Trade and Industry. He was previously head of Singapore sales at Crosby Securities Group, which he left in 1996.

=== Political career ===
Lye first volunteered as a PAP youth member in Thomson SMC in 1987, during the lead-up to the 1988 general election. Following the 1997 Asian financial crisis, Lye volunteered to write petitions at Meet-the-People Sessions hosted by then-Minister for Trade and Industry George Yeo in 1999. Lye joined the PAP in 2001.

Lye was appointed in 2012 as PAP branch chairman for the Bedok Reservoir–Punggol division of Aljunied GRC. He first contested in 2015 in the GRC as part of a five-member PAP team led by former Ang Mo Kio GRC MP Yeo Guat Kwang, but lost with 49.05% of the vote to the incumbent Workers' Party (WP) after a recount requested by the PAP team.

In 2020, Lye became the lead anchor for Aljunied GRC and contested in the ward again, losing to WP with 40.05% of the vote. He was co-opted into the PAP's Central Executive Committee (CEC) in the same year.

In February 2025, Lye stepped down as PAP branch chairman for Bedok Reservoir–Punggol. During the 2025 general election, he was announced as part of a five-member PAP team for Ang Mo Kio GRC led by Senior Minister Lee Hsien Loong. Lye became a Member of Parliament after the PAP won 78.95% of the vote against the Singapore United Party (SUP) and People's Power Party (PPP).

== Personal life ==
Lye is a Roman Catholic. He is married with two children.

== Notes ==
Parliament of Singapore
| Preceded by Nadia Ahmad Samdin; Ng Ling Ling; Gan Thiam Poh; Darryl David; Lee Hsien Loong | Member of Parliament for Ang Mo Kio GRC; 2025–present Served alongside: (2025 - present): Nadia Ahmad Samdin, Jasmin Lau, Darryl David, Lee Hsien Loong | Incumbent |
