= Koh Poh Koon =

Singaporean politician (born 1972)

The Honourable Koh Poh Koon
- 许宝琨
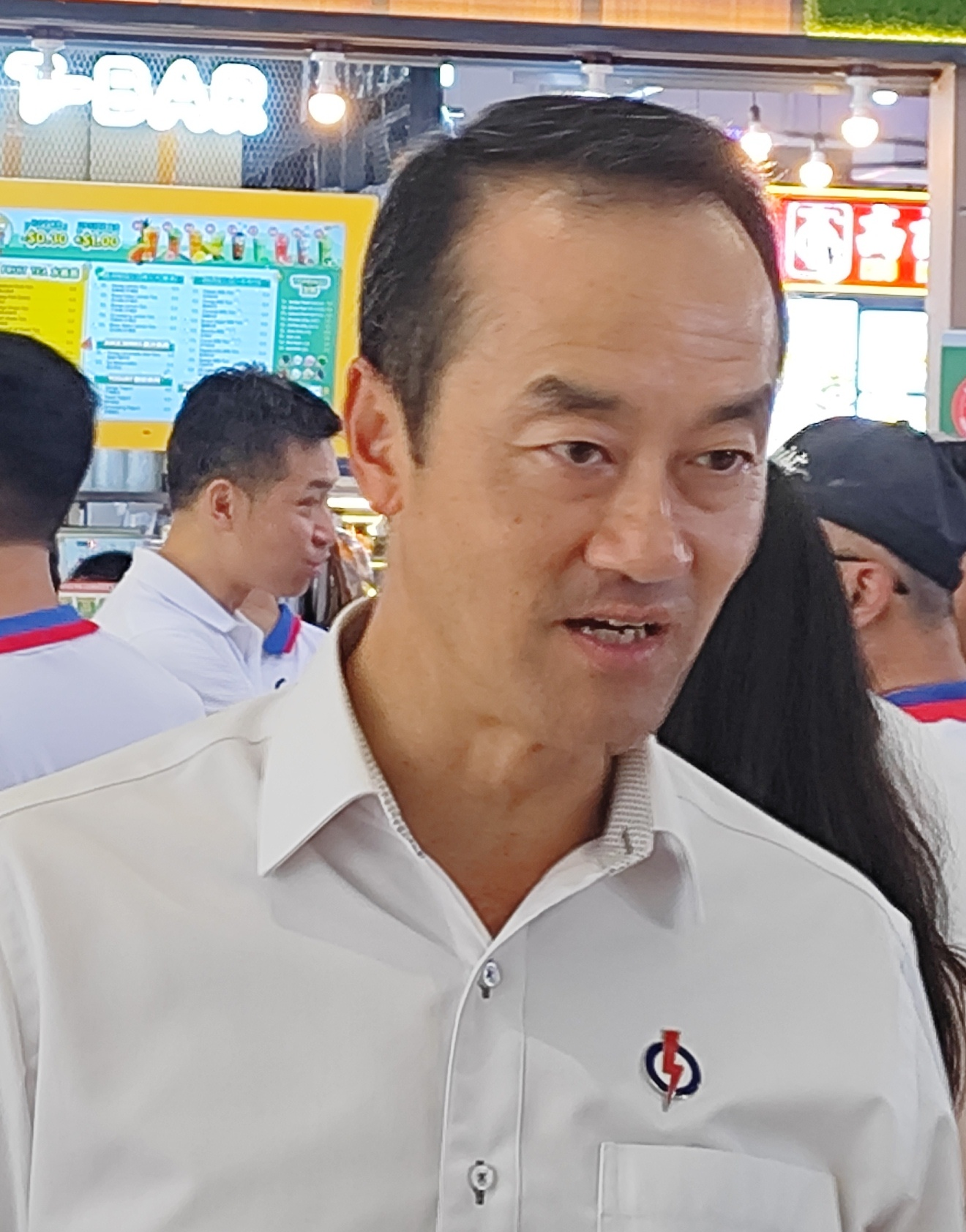
- Koh in 2025

Deputy Secretary-General of the National Trades Union Congress
- In office 22 May 2018 – 14 May 2021
- Secretary-General: Ng Chee Meng
- Succeeded by: Chee Hong Tat

Member of Parliament for Tampines GRC
- Incumbent
- Assumed office 10 July 2020
- Preceded by: PAP held
- Majority: 6,392 (4.65%)

Member of Parliament for Ang Mo Kio GRC
- In office 11 September 2015 – 23 June 2020
- Preceded by: PAP held
- Succeeded by: PAP held

Personal details
- Born: 16 March 1972 (age 54) Singapore
- Party: People's Action Party
- Children: 2
- Education: National University of Singapore (MBBS, MMed)
- Occupation: Politician; colorectal surgeon

Koh Poh Koon (Note: Chinese: 许宝琨; Peng'im: Kou^{2} Bo^{2} Kung^{1}; pinyin: Xǔ Bǎokūn) (born 16 March 1972) is a Singaporean politician and colorectal surgeon. A member of the governing People's Action Party (PAP), Koh is a Member of Parliament (MP) representing the Tampines Group Representation Constituency since 2020. He was also a Senior Minister of State for Manpower from 2021 until 2026 and Senior Minister of State for Health from 2025 until 2026. Prior to entering politics, Koh was a colorectal surgeon and medical researcher.

Koh made his political debut in the 2013 by-election as the PAP candidate contesting in Punggol East SMC against candidates from three other opposition parties, garnering 43.37% of the vote and losing to the Workers' Party's (WP) Lee Li Lian, who won 54.5% of the vote. In the 2015 general election, Koh contested in Ang Mo Kio GRC as part of a six-member PAP team and was elected as an MP representing the Yio Chu Kang division. In the 2020 general election, he joined the PAP team contesting in Tampines GRC and won with 66.41% of the vote. Koh also served as Deputy Secretary-General of the National Trades Union Congress (NTUC) between 2018 and 2021.

Koh had served as Minister of State for Trade and Industry and Minister of State for National Development concurrently between 2016 and 2017 and later Senior Minister of State for Trade and Industry between 2017 and 2020 and Senior Minister of State for National Development between 2017 and 2018. On 23 May 2025, Koh relinquished his appointment in the Ministry of Sustainability and the Environment and was appointed Senior Minister of State in the Ministry of Health, concurrent with his role in the Ministry of Manpower. He announced the relinquishment of all political posts on 22 May 2026 for "family reasons" but retained his MP seat, returning to the backbenches.

== Education ==
Koh attended MacRitchie Primary School, Maris Stella High School and Hwa Chong Junior College before graduating from the Yong Loo Lin School of Medicine at the National University of Singapore in 1996 with a Bachelor of Medicine, Bachelor of Surgery degree.

He went on to complete a Master of Medicine degree in surgery at the National University of Singapore and obtained fellowships from the Royal College of Surgeons of Edinburgh and Academy of Medicine, Singapore.

He also received two Health Manpower Development Programme Scholarships from the Ministry of Health (MOH) to undergo advanced training in the surgical treatment of inflammatory bowel diseases in Edinburgh and at the Cleveland Clinic in Ohio.

== Career ==
=== Medical career ===
In 2011, Koh started Capstone Colorectal Surgery Centre in Mount Elizabeth Medical Centre and left the centre in 2015. Koh was also the founding director of the Colorectal Cancer Genomic Health Service at Singapore General Hospital.

Koh was also a visiting consultant surgeon at Singapore General Hospital until 2021 and became a visiting consultant surgeon at Changi General Hospital since October 2025, reported by AsiaOne.

=== Political career ===
Koh entered politics in January 2013 when he contested as the People's Action Party (PAP) candidate in a by-election in Punggol East SMC triggered by the resignation of its Member of Parliament, Michael Palmer, after it was revealed that he had an extra-marital affair. He contested against candidates from three other parties: Workers' Party's (WP) Lee Li Lian; Reform Party's Kenneth Jeyaretnam; and Singapore Democratic Alliance's Desmond Lim. The by-election ended with Koh garnering 43.37% of the vote and losing to Lee, who won with 54.5% of the vote.

During the campaigning, Koh had called himself "kaki lang" ("one of us" in Teochew) and "son of Punggol". When reporters asked him about his family's ownership of two cars, he had said, "everybody has a car, we have two... We are professionals, we need to travel." His words were perceived as a blunder and reeking of elitism. After losing the election, he admitted that he had misspoken, saying, "It's not logical, even an idiot wouldn't say that. So it was partly my fault."

In the 2015 general election, Koh joined the six-member PAP team contesting in Ang Mo Kio GRC against the Reform Party. Following the results of the election, Koh was elected into Parliament when the six-member PAP team won and clinched 78.64% or 135,115 of the electorate's valid votes in the constituency. Koh thus became a Member of Parliament representing the Yio Chu Kang ward of Ang Mo Kio GRC.

On 1 January 2016, Koh was appointed Minister of State at the Ministries of National Development and Trade and Industry. On 1 May 2017, he was promoted to Senior Minister of State and continued serving in the two Ministries; he relinquished his position in the Ministry of National Development on 30 April 2018. On 23 April 2018, Koh was appointed Deputy Secretary-General of the National Trades Union Congress and he held this position until 15 May 2021.

In the 2020 general election, Koh switched to join the five-member PAP team contesting in Tampines GRC and they won with 66.41% of the vote against the National Solidarity Party (NSP). Koh thus became the Member of Parliament for Tampines GRC. On 27 July 2020, he was appointed Senior Minister of State at the Ministry of Health. He took up an additional appointment as Senior Minister of State at the Ministry of Manpower on 15 May 2021. Koh was appointed Senior Minister of State at the Ministry of Sustainability and the Environment on 13 June 2022, while relinquishing his Ministry of Health portfolio. He took on the Ministry of Health portfolio for the second time after the 2025 general election.

In the 2025 general election, he contested in Tampines GRC again with fellow PAP teammates Charlene Chen, Masagos Zulkifli, Baey Yam Keng, and David Neo. This election saw a four-way fight in Tampines GRC, with the PAP going against the WP, People's Power Party (PPP), and NSP. The PAP was successful and won Tampines GRC with 52.02% of the vote against the WP's 47.37%, PPP's 0.43%, and NSP's 0.18%. This reelected Koh for another five-year term.

On 22 May 2026, Koh announced that he will be resigning from public office from 1 June due to "family reasons", relinquishing his positions as Senior Minister of State for Manpower and Senior Minister of State for Health. He remains as an MP.

== Personal life ==
Koh grew up in a farmhouse at Lorong Cheng Lim in Punggol before he and his family moved to a four-room HDB flat in Toa Payoh. His father was a bus driver who drove the public bus service 82. Koh was the oldest child in his family and often worked part-time jobs when he was young to support his family.

Koh is married to a doctor, with whom he has two daughters.

== Notes ==
Parliament of Singapore
Preceded by Yeo Guat Kwang; Ang Hin Kee; Inderjit Singh; Intan Azura Mokhtar; Lee Hsien Loong; Seng Han Thong	Member of Parliament for Ang Mo Kio GRC; 2015 – 2020; Served alongside: Ang Hin Kee, Intan Azura Mokhtar, Gan Thiam Poh and Lee Hsien Loong	Succeeded by Darryl David; Nadia Ahmad Samdin; Ng Ling Ling; Gan Thiam Poh; Lee Hsien Loong
Preceded by Cheng Li Hui; Masagos Zulkifli; Heng Swee Keat; Desmond Choo	Member of Parliament for Tampines GRC; 2020 – present Served alongside: (2020-2025): Cheng Li Hui, Masagos Zulkifli, Baey Yam Keng and Desmond Choo (2025-present): David Neo, Charlene Chen, Masagos Zulkifli and Baey Yam Keng	Incumbent
