= Balaji Sadasivan =

Singaporean politician and neurosurgeon (1955–2010)

- பாலாஜி சதாசிவன்
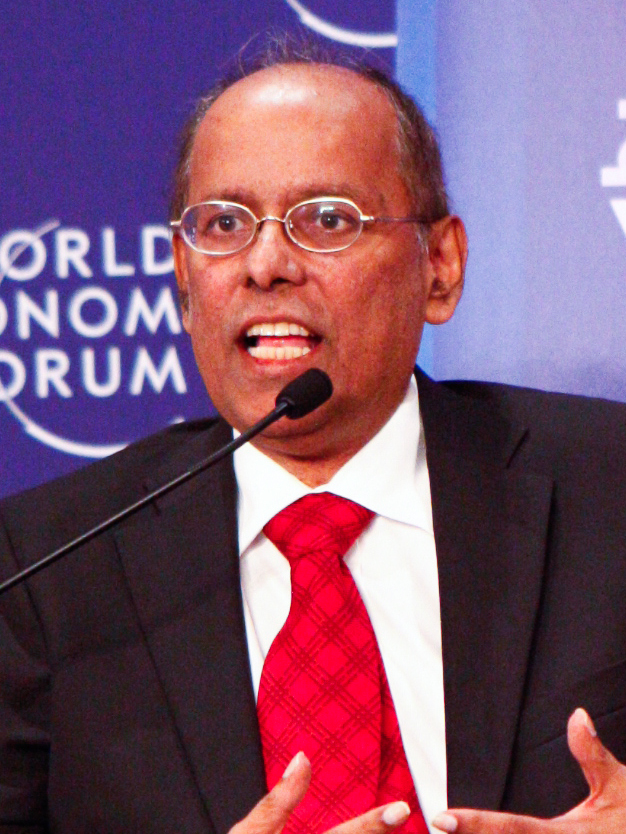
- Balaji in June 2010

Member of the Singapore Parliament for Ang Mo Kio GRC
- In office 25 October 2001 – 27 September 2010
- Preceded by: PAP held
- Succeeded by: PAP held
- Majority: 2001: N/A (walkover); 2006: 47,157 (32.28$)

Personal details
- Born: Balaji Sadasivan; 11 July 1955 Colony of Singapore
- Died: 27 September 2010 (aged 55) Singapore
- Party: People's Action Party
- Spouse: Ma Swan Hoo
- Children: 2
- Education: University of Singapore; Royal College of Physicians and Surgeons of Glasgow; Henry Ford Hospital; Harvard University; University of London
- Profession: Neurosurgeon
- Committees: Member, Committee of Selection (10th Parliament)

Balaji Sadasivan (Note: Tamil: பாலாஜி சதாசிவன், romanized: Pālāji Satāśivaṉ) (11 July 1955 – 27 September 2010) was a Singaporean politician and neurosurgeon. A member of the governing People's Action Party (PAP), he was the Minister of State for the Ministry of the Environment (2001–2003), Ministry of Health and the Ministry of Transport (2001–2004); and subsequently Senior Minister of State for the Ministry of Health (2004–2006), the Ministry of Foreign Affairs (2006–2010) and Ministry of Information, Communications and the Arts (2004–2008). He was also a Member of Parliament representing the Ang Mo Kio Group Representation Constituency from 2001 to 2010.

Balaji was a Fellow of the Royal College of Surgeons (FRCS) and a Fellow of Harvard University. He worked as a neurosurgeon until 2001, publishing over 50 book chapters and journal articles. In 2007, he was appointed chairman of the executive board of the World Health Organization (WHO).

In 2008, Balaji was diagnosed with colorectal cancer and underwent surgical removal of a malignant tumour. Following a relapse of his cancer, Balaji died in his sleep on 27 September 2010 at the age of 55 years, having suffered internal bleeding the previous night.

== Early years and education ==
Balaji was born on 11 July 1955 in Singapore, the son of Indian immigrants. He studied at Raffles Institution, Siglap Secondary School (1969–1971) and National Junior College (1972–1973), he subsequently studied medicine at the University of Singapore. In his second year, he won an essay competition organised by the WHO and received the opportunity to attend a healthcare workshop in Minamata, Japan, where he learned about the devastating effects of Minamata disease, a neurological syndrome caused by severe mercury poisoning. This led him to specialise in neurosurgery later on, which was not a popular discipline at the time. In 1979, Sadasivan graduated with a Bachelor of Medicine and Bachelor of Surgery (M.B.B.S.).

Balaji took on further studies at the Royal College of Physicians and Surgeons of Glasgow, becoming a Fellow of the Royal College of Surgeons (FRCS) in 1984. He trained at the Henry Ford Hospital in Detroit, Michigan, between 1985 and 1990, obtaining a diploma from the American Board of Neurology Surgery and becoming a fellow at Harvard University in 1990. He also worked at Brigham and Women's Hospital, a teaching affiliate of Harvard, and at the Children's Hospital Boston in Boston, Massachusetts. In 1997, he obtained a Bachelor of Laws (LL.B. (Hons.)) from the University of London.

== Career ==
=== Medical career ===
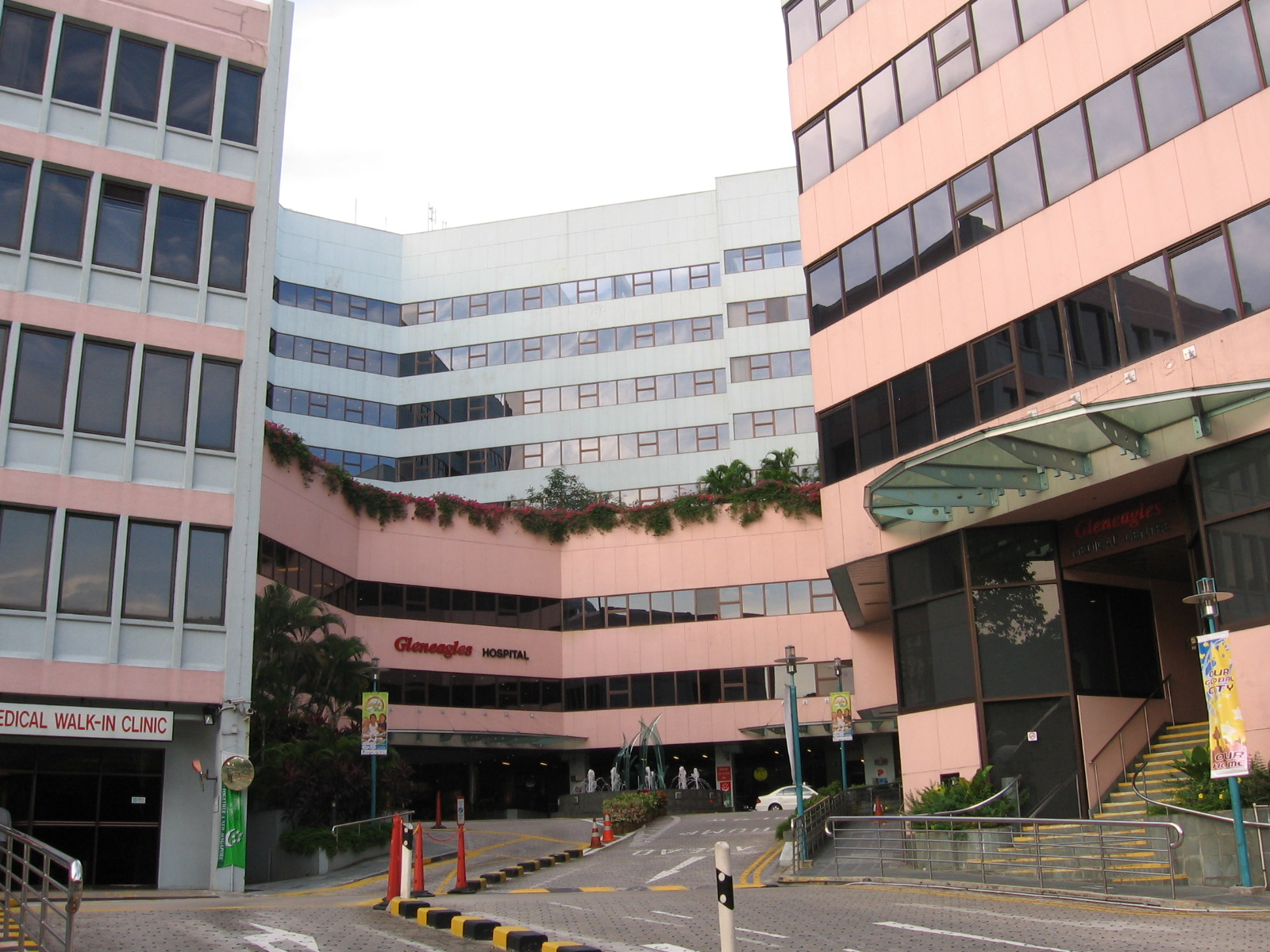
Gleneagles Hospital, photographed in July 2006

Balaji joined Tan Tock Seng Hospital as a consultant neurosurgeon in 1991, where he reorganised the way stroke patients were treated, arranged for the neurosurgical intensive care unit to be computerised, introduced stereotactic brachytherapy for dealing with brain tumours, and chaired the National Neuroscience Institute's planning committee. In 1994, he moved into private practice at Gleneagles Hospital, establishing the first stereotactic radiosurgical treatment system driven by a linear particle accelerator in Singapore. He also worked with medical device manufacturer Siemens to develop image-guided surgical systems. He published more than 50 scientific papers and chapters in neurology books.

=== Political career ===
Balaji left the medical profession to stand as a People's Action Party (PAP) candidate in the 2001 general election for the Ang Mo Kio Group Representation Constituency (GRC). The electoral division, helmed by the Lee Hsien Loong (who became Prime Minister on 12 August 2004), was not contested, and Balaji was declared elected to Parliament on 25 October 2001.

Balaji was regarded as one of the "Super Seven" Members of Parliament who were made officeholders upon election, and served as Minister of State for the Ministry of the Environment (23 November 2001 – 11 May 2003), Ministry of Health and the Ministry of Transport (both 23 November 2001 – 11 August 2004). He was Senior Minister of State for the Ministry of Health from 12 August 2004 to 29 May 2006, handling matters such as the extension of the Human Organ Transplant Act to Muslims and the 2003–2004 severe acute respiratory syndrome (SARS) outbreak. He also worked to combat the spread of HIV, advocating education about the disease in schools and workplaces, and early and regular HIV testing. He brought in universal antenatal testing for HIV, and spoke out against discrimination on the ground of HIV status.

For his constituents, he set up the Cheng San–Seletar Neighbourhood Club. He also conceived an active ageing centre in Ang Mo Kio Town Garden East, which was slated to open in 2010.

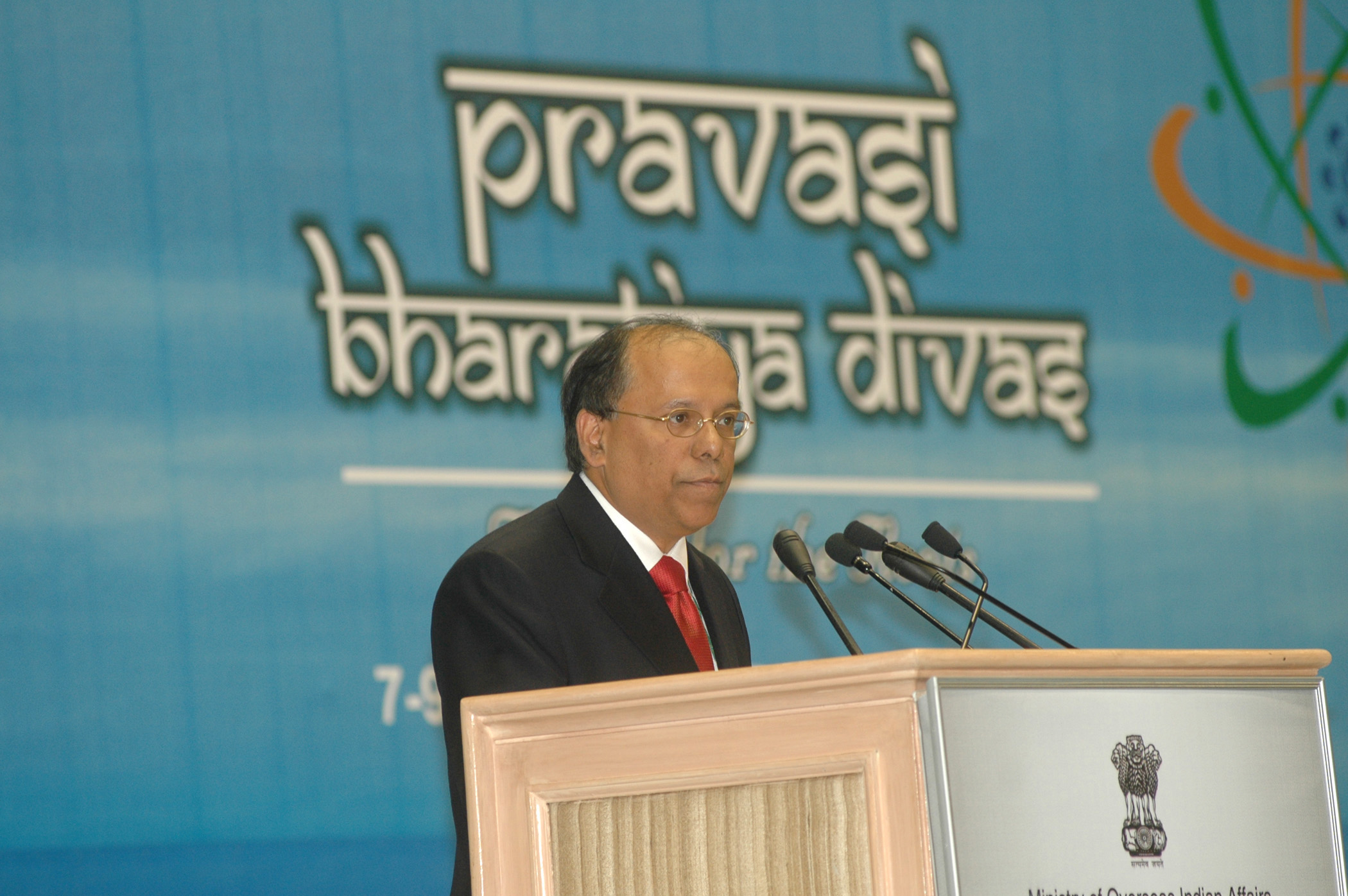
Balaji in India during the Pravasi Bharatiya Divas celebrations, 2007

During the 2006 Singaporean general election, Ang Mo Kio GRC was contested by the Workers' Party. The PAP team, including Balaji, won the contest with 66.14% of the votes polled in the constituency. After the election, Balaji was appointed Senior Minister of State for the Ministry of Foreign Affairs and Ministry of Information, Communications and the Arts from 30 May 2006 to 31 March 2008. Balaji relinquished his Information, Communications and the Arts portfolio with effect from 1 April 2008, remaining as Senior Minister of State for the Ministry of Foreign Affairs.

=== Other career ===
In May 2007, Balaji was appointed Chairman of the WHO Executive Board, the first time a Singaporean had been so elected since the nation became a member of WHO. During his term, he dealt with issues such as global health development, pandemic preparedness (including the 2009 H1N1 flu pandemic), non-communicable diseases and climate change.

Balaji also served as president of the Asian Australasian Society of Neurological Surgeons, the president of the Singapore Indian Development Association (from March 2009) and the Singapore Indian Education Trust, Chairman of the Indian Heritage Centre Steering Committee and a member of the National Art Gallery Implementation Steering Committee, Chairman of the National HIV/AIDS Policy Committee, a member of the National Steering Committee on Racial and Religious Harmony, an advisor to the Tamil Language Council and the People's Association Indian Activity Executive Committee Co-ordinating Council, a member of the Singapore Industrial and Services Employees' Union Council of Advisors, and Honorary Advisor to the Singapore Furniture Industries Council.

On 8 May 2010, he was made an honorary member of the Singapore Medical Association.

== Personal life ==
Balaji was married to Ma Swan Hoo whom he met in medical school and had two children.

Balaji was diagnosed with colorectal cancer and underwent surgical removal of a malignant tumour in 2008. Following a relapse of his cancer, Balaji died in his sleep on 27 September 2010 at 1:50 a.m. at the age of 55 years, having suffered internal bleeding the previous night. He is survived by his wife, Dr. Ma Swan Hoo, his son Dharma Yongwen and daughter Anita Jiawen, and five siblings.

On 18 October 2010, during a sitting of Parliament, Abdullah Tarmugi, Speaker of the Parliament of Singapore, and Mah Bow Tan, Leader of the House, paid tribute to Balaji in the presence of his widow and children, Mah saying "We have lost a dear friend and colleague and an outstanding Singaporean." Parliament then observed a minute's silence. Balaji's medical school classmates set up the Balaji Sadasivan Fund for Medical Undergraduates in his honour.

== Selected works ==
=== Book ===
- The Dancing Girl: A History of Early India, Singapore: Institute of Southeast Asian Studies, 2011, ISBN 978-981-4311-67-0 (published posthumously).

=== Medical articles ===
- Sadasivan, Balaji; Mehta, Bharat; Dujovny, Manuel; Malik, Ghaus M.; Ausman, James I. (August 1989), "Balloon embolization of nontraumatic vertebral arteriovenous fistulae in children", Surgical Neurology, 32 (2): 126–130, doi:10.1016/0090-3019(89)90200-0, PMID 2749456.
- Morgan, Jay K.; Sadasivan, Balaji; Ausman, James I.; Mehta, Bharat (January 1990), "Thrombolytic therapy and posterior circulation extracranial-intracranial bypass for acute basilar artery thrombosis: Case report", Surgical Neurology, 33 (1): 43–47, doi:10.1016/0090-3019(90)90224-D, PMID 2300877.
- Ausman, James I.; Diaz, Fernando G.; Vacca, Dante F.; Sadasivan, Balaji (April 1990), "Superficial temporal and occipital artery bypass pedicles to superior, anterior inferior, and posterior inferior cerebellar arteries for vertebrobasilar insufficiency", Journal of Neurosurgery, 72 (4): 554–558, doi:10.3171/jns.1990.72.4.0554, PMID 2319313.
- Sadasivan, Balaji; Malik, Ghaus M.; Lee, Chang; Ausman, James I. (May 1990), "Vascular malformations and pregnancy", Surgical Neurology, 33 (5): 305–313, doi:10.1016/0090-3019(90)90197-W, PMID 2330531.
- Ausman, James I.; Diaz, Fernando G.; Sadasivan, Balaji; Gonzeles-Portillo Jr., Marco; Malik, Ghaus M. Malik; Deopujari, Chandrashekhar E. (July 1990), "Giant intracranial aneurysm surgery: The role of microvascular reconstruction", Surgical Neurology, 34 (1): 8–15, doi:10.1016/0090-3019(90)90166-M, PMID 2360165.
- Sadasivan, Balaji; Ma, Swanhoo; Dujovny, Manuel; Ho, Khang Loon; Ausman, James I. (July 1990), "Use of experimental aneurysms to evaluate wrapping materials", Surgical Neurology, 34 (1): 3–7, doi:10.1016/0090-3019(90)90165-L, PMID 2360161.
- Ausman, James I.; Diaz, Fernando G.; Mullan, Sean Mullan; Gehring, Randy; Sadasivan, Balaji; Dujovny, Manuel (September 1990), "Posterior inferior to posterior inferior cerebellar artery anastomosis combined with trapping for vertebral artery aneurysm", Journal of Neurosurgery, 73 (3): 462–465, doi:10.3171/jns.1990.73.3.0462, PMID 2384786.
- Laranjeira, Manuel; Sadasivan, Balaji; Ausman, James I. (October 1990), "Direct surgery for carotid bifurcation artery aneurysms", Surgical Neurology, 34 (4): 250–254, doi:10.1016/0090-3019(90)90136-D, PMID 2399487.
- Malik, Ghaus M.; Sadasivan, Balaji; Knighton, Robert S.; Ausman, James I. (1991), "The management of arteriovenous malformations in children", Child's Nervous System, 7 (1): 43–47, doi:10.1007/BF00263833, PMID 2054808, S2CID 24862061.

== See also ==
- List of members of the Singapore Parliament who died in office

== Notes ==
Political offices
Unknown	Minister of State for Health; 2001–2004	Succeeded by Himself as Senior Minister of State
Preceded by Himself as Minister of State	Senior Minister of State for Health; 2004–2006	Succeeded by Heng Chee How
Unknown	Senior Minister of State for Information, Communications and the Arts; 2004–2008	Succeeded by Lui Tuck Yew
Preceded by Position established	Senior Minister of State for Foreign Affairs; 2006–2010	Vacant Title next held by Masagos Zulkifli; 2012
Parliament of Singapore
Preceded by Tang Guan Seng; Inderjit Singh; Tan Boon Wan; Lee Hsien Loong; Seng Han Thong	Member of Parliament for Ang Mo Ko GRC; 2001–2010; Served alongside: (2001 - 2006): Inderjit Singh, Wee Siew Kim, Tan Boon Wan, Lee Hsien Loong, Seng Han Thong (2006 - 2010): Inderjit Singh, Wee Siew Kim, Lee Bee Wah, Lam Pin Min, Lee Hsien Loong	Succeeded by Yeo Guat Kwang; Ang Hin Kee; Inderjit Singh; Intan Azura Mokhtar; Lee Hsien Loong; Seng Han Thong
