= UTAC Group =

Semiconductor testing firm

United Test and Assembly Centre
- Company type: Private
- Industry: Semiconductors
- Founded: 1997
- Headquarters: Singapore
- Key people: Dr. John Nelson, President & CEO
- Website: www.utacgroup.com

United Test and Assembly Center Ltd (Abbreviation: UTAC; Chinese: 联合科技; pinyin: Liánhé Kējì) is one of the largest providers of test and assembly services for a wide range of semiconductor devices, including memory, mixed-signal/RF and logic integrated circuits. Founded in 1997 by Inderjit Singh and commencing full operations in 1999, the company started out by acquiring the semiconductor test operations of Fujitsu Microelectronics Asia Pte. Ltd.

At the end of 2006, the company was ranked the fifth largest independent provider of semiconductor tests by Gartner Dataquest. Headquartered in Singapore, UTAC has manufacturing facilities in Singapore, Thailand, China, Indonesia and Malaysia with global sales offices located worldwide including the United States, Italy and Japan.

== Significant milestones ==
In 2003, UTAC established its wholly owned Shanghai operations in Waigaoqiao – a free trade zone in Shanghai. It also formed an alliance with Amkor Technology Inc. in China, combining the strengths of both companies to create a powerful turnkey assembly and test supplier capable of supporting as well as Integrated Device Manufacturers looking to service their end customers in the China market. This partnership was further enhanced in 2007 when both companies announced that they had entered into a multi-year cross-licensing agreement under which Amkor would license its MicroLeadFrame patents to UTAC, and UTAC would license its QFN patents to Amkor. The agreement covers the license of intellectual property rights and transfer of associated packaging technologies.

In 2005, UTAC completed the acquisition of UltraTera Corporation to become a leading test player in the world. In the same year, the company announced several joint ventures with SMIC to build a test and assembly center in Chengdu, China, and with Korea's Nepes Corp to build the first 12-inch wafer bumping facility in Singapore.

In 2006, UTAC announced its plans to acquire Thailand-based NS Electronics Bangkok (NSEB) for S$175 million after announcing plans to invest S$500 million into its Singapore operations.

June 26, 2007: Proposed acquisition of UTAC by Global A&T Electronics, a special purpose company formed by Affinity Equity Partners and TPG Capital.

August 12, 2020: UTAC Holdings Ltd. announced that it has completed its sale to Wise Road Capital, a global private equity firm. The transaction was originally announced on January 23, 2020.

In 2021, UTAC acquired Powertech Technology Inc,’s wafer bumping operations through an Asset purchase agreement (APA). The deal also included a Transitional service agreement and License agreement.

== Main customers ==
Some of UTAC's customers include:

1. Seagate – a global hard disk drive manufacturer.
2. Qualcomm – a wireless telecommunications technology provider.
3. SanDisk – a manufacturer of flash memory.
4. Hynix – a global memory semiconductor manufacturer.
