= Jasmin Lau =

Singaporean politician (born 1983)

The Honourable Jasmin Lau
- 刘洁敏

Minister for Manpower
- Acting
- Assumed office 27 July 2026
- Prime Minister: Lawrence Wong
- Preceded by: Tan See Leng

Member of the Singapore Parliament for Ang Mo Kio GRC
- Incumbent
- Assumed office 3 May 2025
- Preceded by: PAP held
- Majority: 99,688 (68.10%)

Personal details
- Born: 30 June 1983 Singapore
- Party: People's Action Party
- Spouse: Joel Tan
- Children: 2
- Education: University of Pennsylvania; Massachusetts Institute of Technology

Jasmin Lau (Note: Chinese: 刘洁敏; pinyin: Liú Jiémǐn) (born 30 June 1983) is a Singaporean politician and former civil servant who has served as the acting Minister for Manpower since 2026. A member of the People's Action Party (PAP), she has served as the Member of Parliament (MP) representing the Seletar–Serangoon division of Ang Mo Kio Group Representation Constituency (GRC) since 2025.

== Career ==
Lau was in the civil service since 2006, and was posted to six different positions, including being the deputy secretary for Ministry of Health, before resigning on 1 April 2025.

During the 2025 general election, Lau was announced to contest Ang Mo Kio Group Representation Constituency (GRC), led by Senior Minister Lee Hsien Loong. The team contested Ang Mo Kio GRC against People's Power Party (PPP) and new party Singapore United Party (SUP) in a three way contest and the team won the contest with almost 79 percent of the vote with the other two parties receiving around 10 percent each. Lau has served as the Vice-Chairman of the Ang Mo Kio Town Council (AMKTC) since 2025.

Following the 2025 general election, Lau was appointed Minister of State for Education and Digital Development and Information. On 22 July 2026, she was promoted to Senior Minister of State for Digital Development and Information, effective 27 July, in a cabinet reshuffle by Prime Minister Lawrence Wong. She would also take up the role of Acting Minister for Manpower while relinquishing her post in the Ministry of Education.

== Personal life ==
Lau enjoys playing netball and basketball. She is married to Joel Tan, a chief executive officer for non-profit Kidstart under the Early Childhood Development Agency. They have two sons.

== Notes ==
Preceded by Tan See Leng	Minister for Manpower; 2026 – present	Incumbent
Parliament of Singapore
Preceded by Nadia Ahmad Samdin; Ng Ling Ling; Gan Thiam Poh; Darryl David; Lee Hsien Loong	Member of Parliament for Ang Mo Kio GRC; 2025–present Served alongside: (2025 - present): Nadia Ahmad Samdin, Victor Lye, Darryl David, Lee Hsien Loong	Incumbent
