= Singapore National Co-operative Federation =

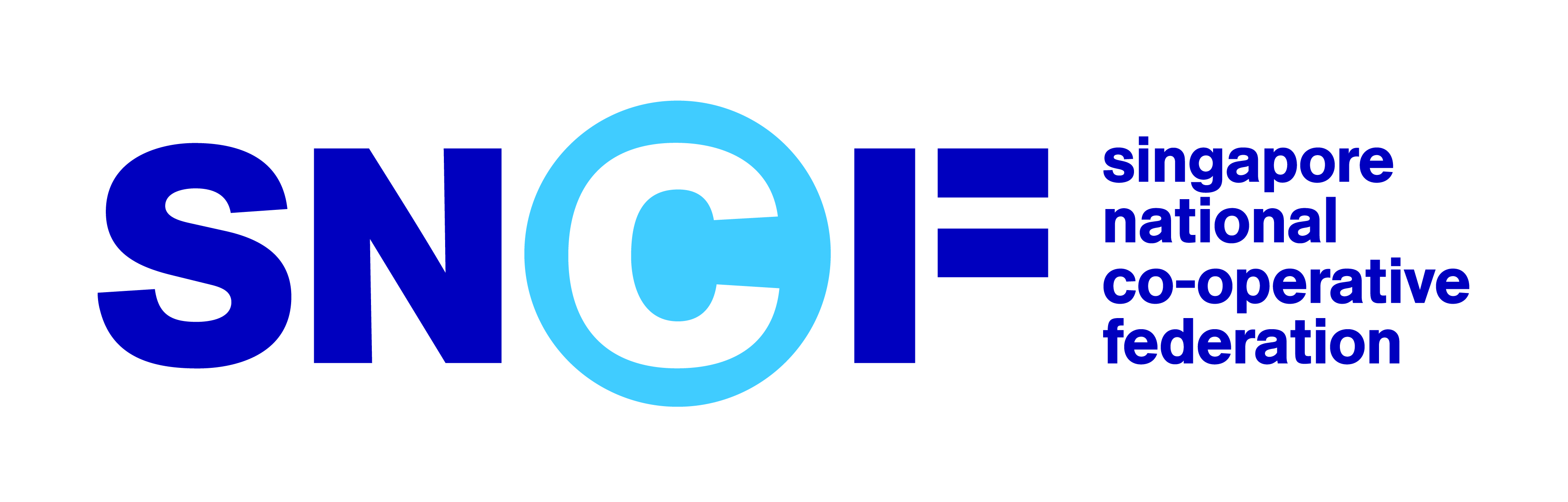
- Abbreviation: SNCF
- Formation: September 1980; 45 years ago
- Location: Singapore
- Coordinates: 1.3331°N 103.8391°E
- CEO: Ang Hin Kee
- Affiliations: ICA, WCCU
- Staff: 20
- Website: sncf.coop

The Singapore National Co-operative Federation (SNCF) is a body of co-operative movements in Singapore. It was formed in September 1980. It is a member of several global co-operative bodies such as the International Co-operative Alliance, the World Council of Credit Unions, and the Association of Asian Confederation of Credit Unions.

== History of the co-operative movement in Singapore ==
The cooperative concept was brought to Singapore by the British colonial authorities. After the First World War when prices of food and other essentials escalated, many civil servants resorted to borrowing from moneylenders who charged very high interest rates. In response to these circumstances, the British colonial authorities decided to pass the Straits Settlement Co-operative Societies Ordinance on 3 November 1924. After this ordinance was passed, 43 thrift and loan societies were formed in just 15 years, between 1925 and 1940.

On 16 November 1933, the Singapore Urban Co-operative Union Ltd was registered to serve as a coordinating body for the thrifts and loans societies. This body was renamed the Singapore Co-operative Union Ltd in July 1954, and became the Singapore National Co-operative Union Ltd in May 1972.

In September 1980, the Singapore National Co-operative Federation (SNCF) was formed. Thereafter in 1982, the union was renamed the Singapore Amalgamated Services Co-operative Organisation Ltd (SASCO) which functioned as a secondary co-operative focusing on welfare issues.
