= Nadia Ahmad Samdin =

Singaporean politician and consultant (born 1990)

The Honourable Nadia Ahmad Samdin
- ناديا احمد سمدين
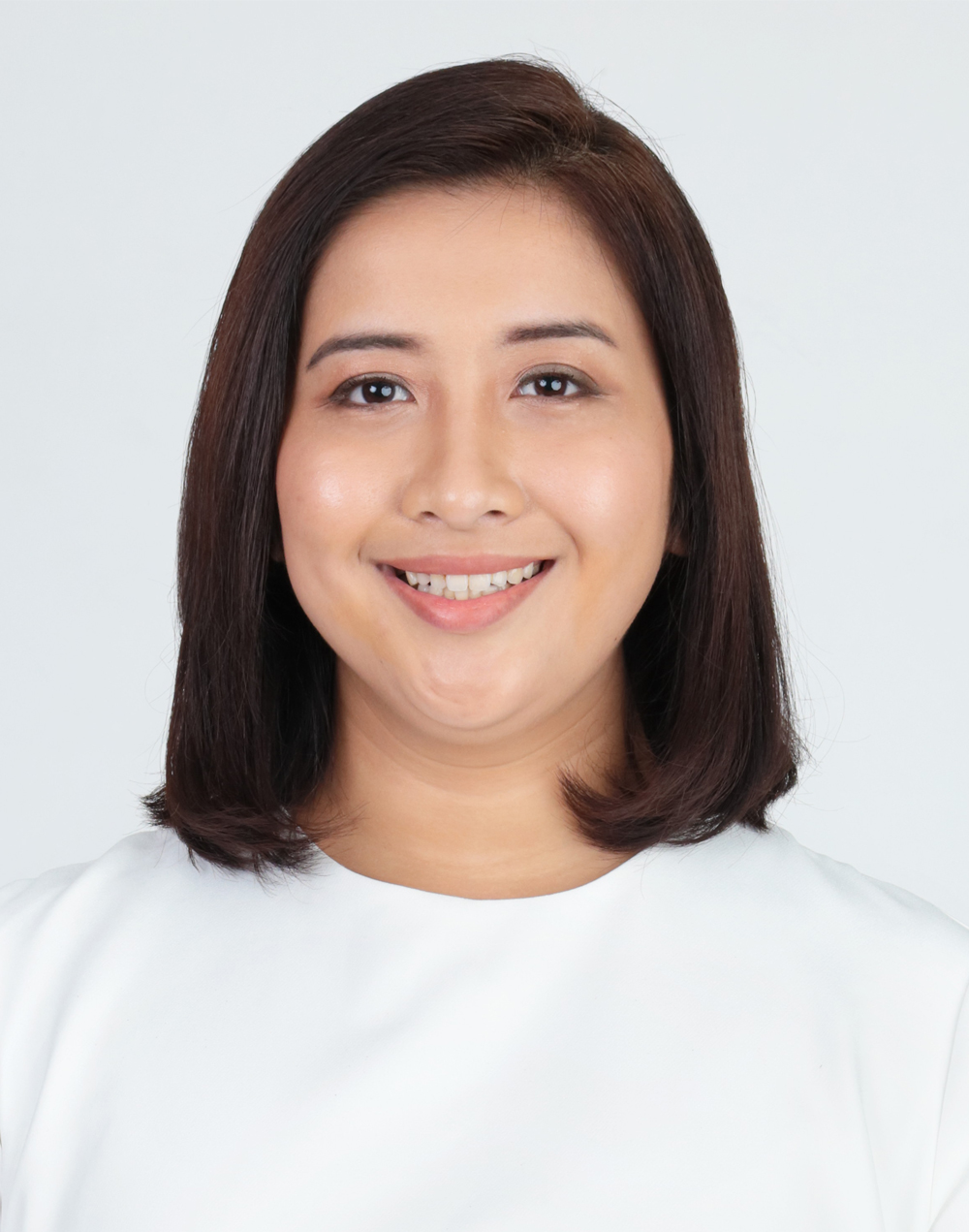
- Official portrait, 2021

Member of the Singapore Parliament for Ang Mo Kio GRC
- Incumbent
- Assumed office 10 July 2020
- Preceded by: PAP held
- Majority: 2020: 75,920 (43.81%); 2025: 99,688 (68.10%)

Personal details
- Born: Nadia binte Ahmad Samdin; 22 March 1990 (age 36) Singapore
- Party: People's Action Party
- Children: 1
- Education: Singapore Management University (LLB)
- Occupation: Politician; lawyer

Nadia binte Ahmad Samdin (Note: Jawi: ناديا بنت احمد سمدين) (born 22 March 1990) is a Singaporean politician, lawyer and former media producer. A member of the governing People's Action Party (PAP), she has been the Member of Parliament (MP) for the Cheng San division of Ang Mo Kio Group Representation Constituency (GRC) since 2025. She had previously represented the defunct Cheng San–Seletar division of the same constituency between 2020 and 2025.

== Education ==
Nadia attended CHIJ Katong Convent and Victoria Junior College before graduating from the Singapore Management University with a Bachelor of Laws.

== Career ==
Nadia was formerly a current affairs producer for CNA. She subsequently returned to TSMP Law Corporation to be associate director in the firm's corporate transactional team. In 2020, she left the firm to join Tri Sector Associates, a social impact consultancy.

=== Political career ===
Nadia was fielded in the 2020 general election to contest in Ang Mo Kio GRC when Ang Hin Kee and Intan Azura Mokhtar stepped down from politics. She is on the PAP ticket against the Reform Party. Her running mates were Prime Minister of Singapore Lee Hsien Loong, Darryl David, Gan Thiam Poh and Ng Ling Ling. On 11 July 2020, the PAP team were declared elected Members of Parliament representing Ang Mo Kio GRC in the 14th Parliament after garnering 71.91% of the valid votes.

During the 2025 general election, Nadia remained in the PAP team, led by Senior Minister Lee Hsien Loong, contesting Ang Mo Kio GRC against People's Power Party (PPP) and new party Singapore United Party (SUP) in a three way contest. The PAP team won the contest with almost 79 percent of the vote with the other two parties receiving around 10 percent each. Nadia is part of the Government Parliamentary Committee under Sustainability and the Environment where she serves as deputy chairman since 2025.

== Community service ==
Nadia used to be a district councillor in the South East Community Development Council and a panel advisor in the Youth Courts.

She is currently on the board of the People's Association and the Public Transport Council.

== Personal life ==
Nadia is married with a son.

== Notes ==
Parliament of Singapore
Preceded by Darryl David; Ang Hin Kee; Intan Azura Mokhtar; Gan Thiam Poh; Lee Hsien Loong; Koh Poh Koon	Member of Parliament for Ang Mo Kio GRC; 2015–present Served alongside: (2020 - 2025): Darryl David, Ng Ling Ling, Gan Thiam Poh, Lee Hsien Loong (2025 - present): Darryl David, Jasmin Lau, Victor Lye, Lee Hsien Loong	Incumbent
