= Ng Ling Ling =

Singaporean politician

- 黃玲玲
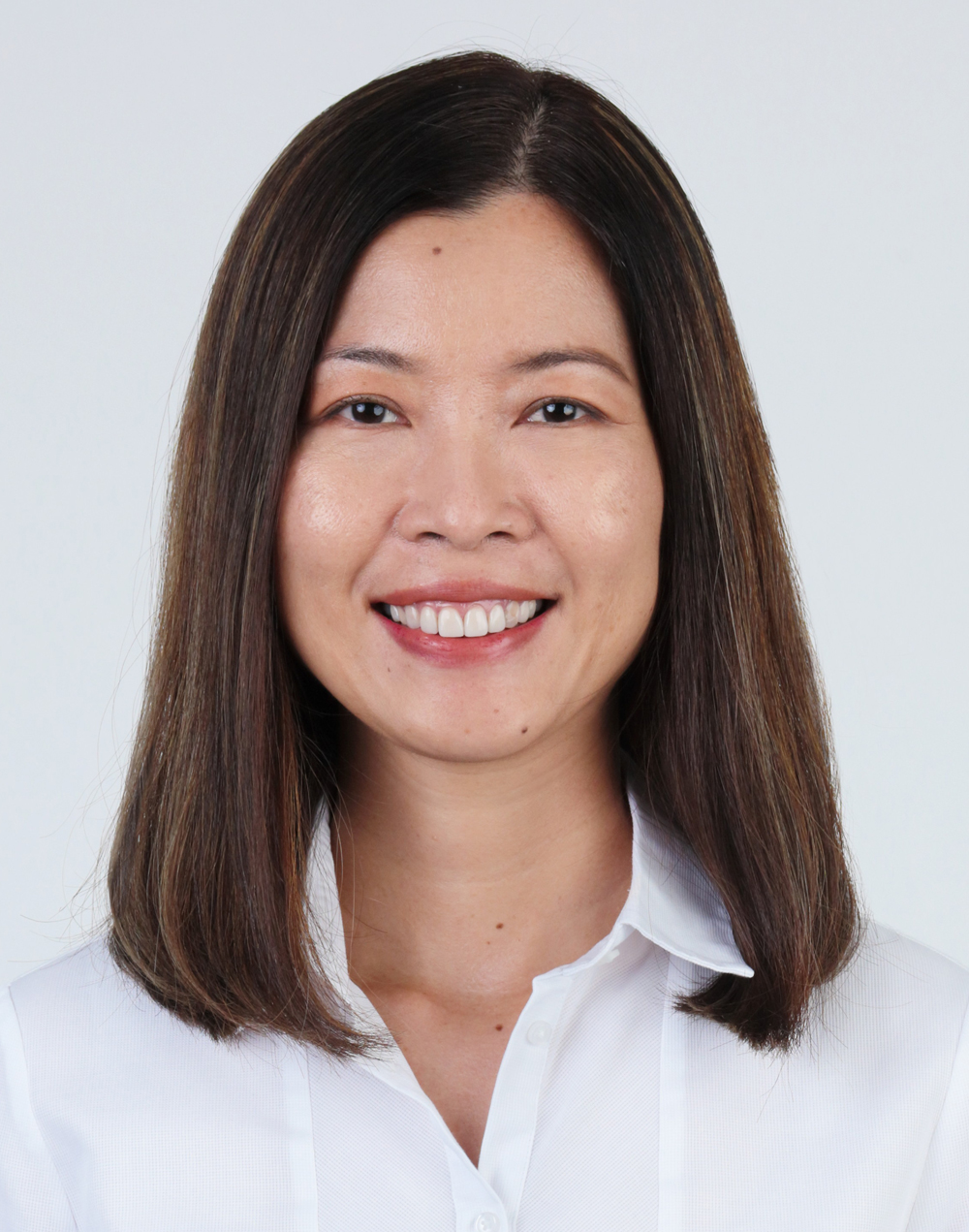
- Official portrait, 2021

Member of Parliament for Ang Mo Kio GRC
- In office 24 August 2020 – 15 April 2025
- Preceded by: PAP held
- Succeeded by: PAP held
- Majority: 75,830 (43.82%)

Personal details
- Born: 11 February 1972 (age 54) Singapore
- Party: People's Action Party
- Children: 1
- Education: Nanyang Technological University (BAcy); Australian National University (MPA)
- Occupation: Politician; banker

Ng Ling Ling (Chinese: 黄玲玲; pinyin: Huáng Línglíng; Pe̍h-ōe-jī: N̂g Lêng-lêng; born 11 February 1972) is a Singaporean banker and former politician. A former member of the governing People's Action Party (PAP), Ng was the Member of Parliament (MP), as part of a PAP team, representing Ang Mo Kio Group Representation Constituency from 2020 and 2025.

== Education ==
Ng attended Raffles Girls' School and Raffles Junior College. She graduated from Nanyang Technological University with a Bachelor of Accountancy in 1994 and completed a Master of Public Administration at the Australian National University in 2003.

== Career ==
Upon graduation from university, Ng worked in the banking industry for six years. In 2001, Ng joined the social service sector by working at the National Council of Social Service. Ng became the managing director of the Community Chest for five years, stepping down in June 2018. Ng was the former chief of future primary care and director of community engagement at the Ministry of Health's Office for Healthcare Transformation.

=== Political career ===
Ng was fielded by the People's Action Party (PAP) in the 2020 general election to contest in Ang Mo Kio GRC when Ang Hin Kee and Intan Azura Mokhtar retired from politics. She was part of the five-member PAP team against the Reform Party. Ng's running mates were Prime Minister Lee Hsien Loong, Darryl David, Gan Thiam Poh and Nadia Ahmad Samdin. On 11 July 2020, Ng and the PAP team were elected Members of Parliament representing Ang Mo Kio GRC in the 14th Parliament after garnering 71.91% of the vote. She was subsequently appointed Deputy Chair of the Government Parliamentary Committee (GPC) for Health. She retired from politics ahead of the 2025 general election as her former Jalan Kayu ward was merged with Gan Thiam Poh's Fernvale ward to form a new Jalan Kayu SMC in which former cabinet minister Ng Chee Meng was fielded.

== Accolades ==
Ng was awarded 2018 Her World Woman of the Year for her work in the Community Chest of Singapore.

== Personal life ==
Ng grew up in a three-room HDB flat. She is married with one son.

Parliament of Singapore
Preceded by Darryl David; Ang Hin Kee; Intan Azura Mokhtar; Gan Thiam Poh; Lee Hsien Loong; Koh Poh Koon	Member of Parliament for Ang Mo Kio GRC; 2015–2020; Served alongside: Darryl David, Nadia Ahmad Samdin, Gan Thiam Poh, Lee Hsien Loong	Succeeded by Darryl David; Nadia Ahmad Samdin; Victor Lye; Jasmin Lau; Lee Hsien Loong
