= Gan Thiam Poh =

Singaporean politician and businessman

Gan Thiam Poh PBM
- 颜添宝
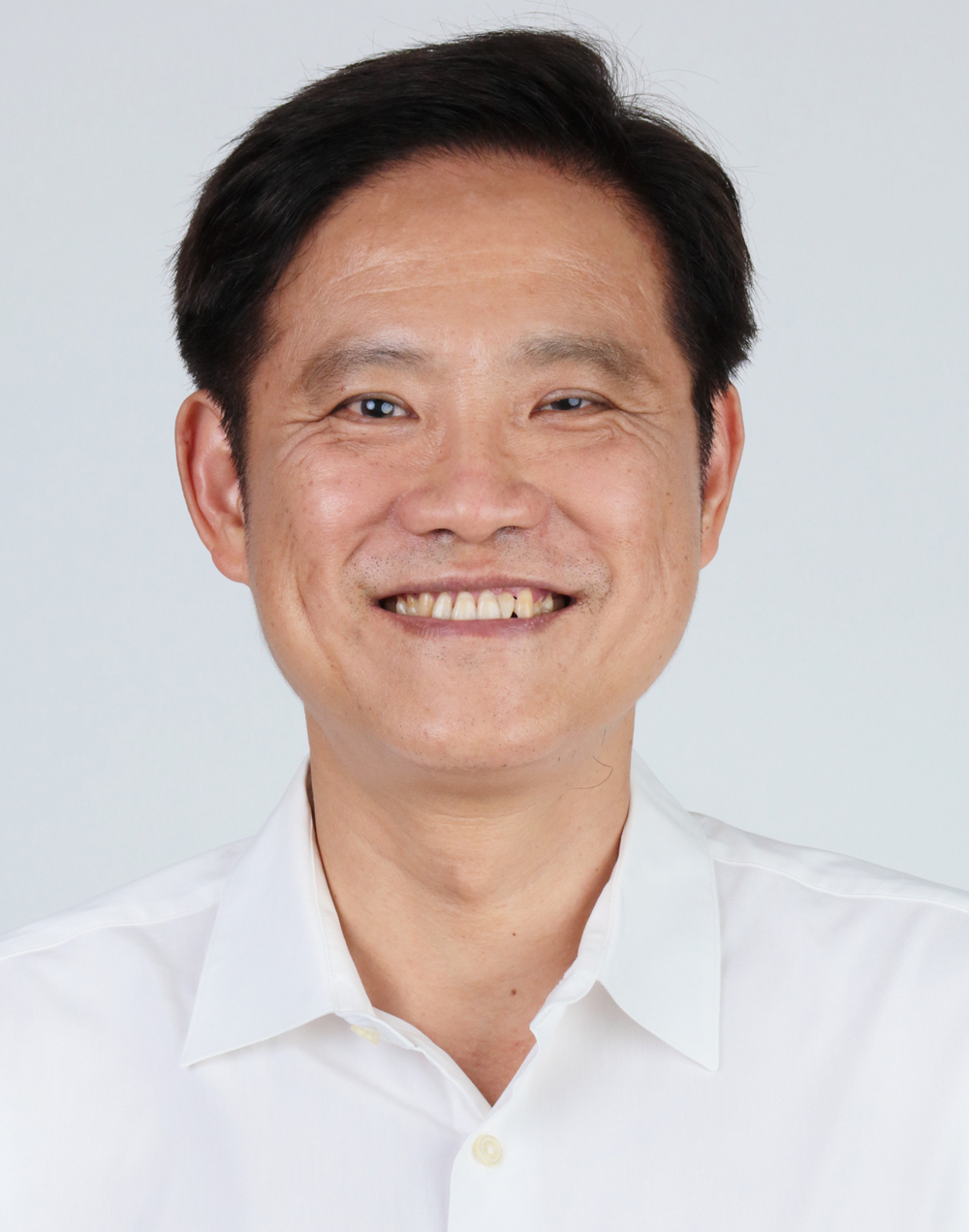
- Official portrait, 2021

Member of Parliament for Ang Mo Kio GRC
- In office 11 September 2015 – 15 April 2025
- Preceded by: PAP held
- Succeeded by: PAP held
- Majority: 2015: 98,404 (57.26%); 2020: 75,920 (43.81%)

Member of Parliament for Pasir Ris–Punggol GRC
- In office 7 May 2011 – 11 September 2015
- Preceded by: PAP held
- Succeeded by: PAP held
- Majority: 44,466 (28.30%)

Personal details
- Born: 23 October 1963 (age 62) Singapore
- Party: People's Action Party
- Education: National University of Singapore (BS)

Chinese name
- Simplified Chinese: 颜添宝
- Traditional Chinese: 顏添寶
- Hanyu Pinyin: Yán Tiānbǎo
- Hokkien POJ: Gân Thiam-pó

Gan Thiam Poh PBM (Chinese: 颜添宝; pinyin: Yán Tiānbǎo; born 23 October 1963) is a Singaporean businessman and retired politician. A member of the governing People's Action Party (PAP), he was the Member of Parliament (MP) representing the Fernvale division of Ang Mo Kio Group Representation Constituency (GRC) between 2020 and 2025. He also represented the Sengkang South division of Ang Mo Kio GRC between 2015 and 2020, and the Punggol South division of Pasir Ris–Punggol GRC between 2011 and 2015.

== Early life and education ==
Gan attended Mee Toh Primary School, Hwi Yoh Secondary School and Outram Secondary School before graduating from the National University of Singapore in 1988 with a Bachelor of Science degree in economics, mathematics and computer programming & applications.

He also obtained a diploma in accounting, costing and business statistics from the London Chamber of Commerce & Industry in 1983. He received a certificate in English and Chinese translation and interpretation from Temasek Polytechnic in 2003.

== Career ==
Gan has worked at DBS Bank as its senior vice-president since 2002. Before that, he had worked at Maybank and United Overseas Bank. He was awarded the Public Service Medal in 2001.

=== Political career ===
Gan spent 15 years volunteering in Potong Pasir Single Member Constituency (SMC). He was the vice-chairman of the Citizens' Consultative Committee and the Community Club Management Committee, as well as the branch secretary of the PAP in Potong Pasir SMC. Gan became an MP after winning the 2011 general election as part of a six-member PAP team for Pasir Ris–Punggol GRC led by Deputy Primer Minister Teo Chee Hean. Gan subsequently represented the Punggol South division

Ahead of his election in 2011, Gan stated that the opposition's presence in Parliament would be "good for Singapore's development", but that they had to be certain to "propose a programme to serve the people and not just oppose the PAP for the sake of it".

In the 2015 general election, Gan was shifted to Ang Mo Kio GRC to contest as part of a six-member PAP team as his ward was shifted to the latter's GRC renaming the ward as Sengkang South. The PAP won with 78.6% of the vote. He was reelected as part of a five-member team in the 2020 general election with 71.91% of the vote. He subsequently represented the Fernvale ward.

Gan retired from politics ahead of the 2025 general election as his former Fernvale ward was merged with Ng Ling Ling's Jalan Kayu ward to form a new Jalan Kayu SMC in which former cabinet minister Ng Chee Meng was fielded.

== Personal life ==
Gan is married and has two daughters. He is a Buddhist and is fluent in Hokkien, Teochew and Cantonese.

== See also ==
- List of Singapore MPs
- List of current Singapore MPs

Parliament of Singapore
Preceded by Ahmad Magad; Teo Chee Hean; Penny Low; Teo Ser Luck; Charles Chong; Michael Palmer	Member of Parliament for Pasir Ris–Punggol GRC; 2011 – 2015; Served alongside: Zainal Sapari, Teo Chee Hean, Penny Low, Teo Ser Luck, Janil Puthucheary	Succeeded by Zainal Sapari; Teo Chee Hean; Ng Chee Meng; Teo Ser Luck; Sun Xueling; Janil Puthucheary
Preceded by Yeo Guat Kwang; Ang Hin Kee; Inderjit Singh; Intan Azura Mokhtar; Lee Hsien Loong; Seng Han Thong	Member of Parliament for Ang Mo Kio GRC; 2015 – 2025; Served alongside: (2015 – 2020): Darryl David, Ang Hin Kee, Intan Azura Mokhtar, Lee Hsien Loong, Koh Poh Koon (2020 – 2025): Darryl David, Nadia Ahmad Samdin, Ng Ling Ling, Lee Hsien Loong	Succeeded by Darryl David; Nadia Ahmad Samdin; Victor Lye; Jasmin Lau; Lee Hsien Loong
