= Inderjit Singh =

Inderjit Singh can refer to:

- Indarjit Singh, British journalist and interfaith activist
- Inderjit Singh (Singaporean politician), former member of the Parliament of Singapore
- Kunwar Inderjit Singh, former Prime Minister of Nepal
- Rao Inderjit Singh, Indian politician
- Inderjit Singh Reyat, alleged for the bombing of Air India Flight 182
