= Georgina Chang =

Singaporean journalist

Georgina Chang is a Singaporean who used to head Mediacorp's The Celebrity Agency. She has left Mediacorp since then. She is also a former radio personality, television broadcaster, and newspaper columnist. Chang was also the vice-president of Mediacorp's English Programming (Music), Radio, and the creative director of Singapore radio stations Lush 99.5FM (till 31 August 2017 before it ceased operations due to low listenership) and 987FM.

== Career ==
Chang studied at CHIJ Katong Convent and Victoria Junior College before embarking on a career as a radio DJ for the first 24-hour music station in Singapore. She then hosted Singapore's longest-running variety TV show as well as year-end countdown shows for the terrestrial television station now known as MediaCorp TV.

Chang joined STAR television's Channel V in Hong Kong and was an anchor for the daily music news program. She joined NBC Asia for a year before returning to Mediacorp, where she became the programming director for 98.7FM. Chang left the station in 2001.

Chang has also written various columns and travel stories for the Today, The Star newspaper, Her World magazine, Men's Health, Silkwinds and 8 Days magazine.

Chang was a tennis presenter and reporter on Star Sports, hosting ACE, a weekly tennis show. She was also the on-site presenter and reporter for the World Pool Championships and the on-site presenter for the Asian 9 Ball Tour. She left Star Sports in 2009.

Chang returned to Mediacorp in 2009 and held the position of senior creative director for 987FM and Lush 99.5FM.

In 2015, Chang was the head of The Celebrity Agency.

== Personal life ==
Chang was married to television host Darryl David in 1998 but they have since divorced.
