= Darryl David =

Singaporean politician (born 1970)

The Honourable Darryl David
- டேரல் டேவிட்
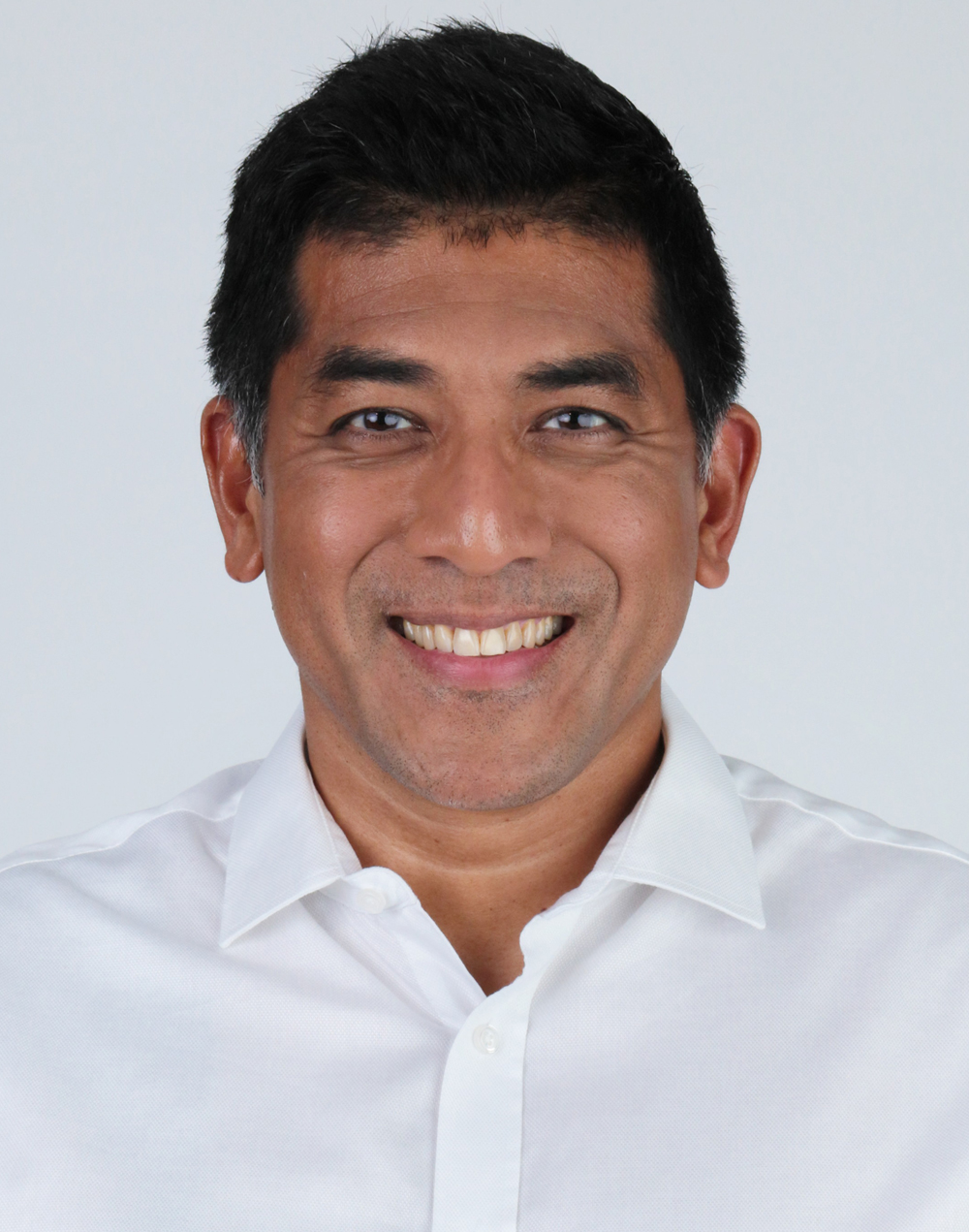
- Official portrait, 2021

Member of the Singapore Parliament for Ang Mo Kio GRC
- Incumbent
- Assumed office 11 September 2015
- Preceded by: PAP held
- Majority: 2015: 98,404 (57.26%); 2020: 75,920 (43.81%); 2025: 99,688 (68.10%)

Personal details
- Born: Darryl Wilson David; 19 October 1970 (age 56) Singapore
- Party: People's Action Party
- Spouse(s): Georgina Chang (m. 1998, divorced) Christina Sim (m. 2006)
- Children: 2
- Education: National University of Singapore (BA, MPA); Nanyang Technological University (MBA)

Darryl Wilson David (Note: Tamil: டேரல் வில்சன் டேவிட், romanized: Ṭēril Vilcaṉ Ṭēviṭ) (born 19 October 1970) is a Singaporean politician, former television host, and actor. A member of the People's Action Party (PAP), he has been the Member of Parliament (MP) representing the Ang Mo Kio–Hougang division of Ang Mo Kio Group Representation Constituency (GRC) since 2015.

== Education ==
David was educated at St. Michael's School, Raffles Institution, and Raffles Junior College before graduating from the National University of Singapore with a Bachelor of Arts with honours degree in English literature.

He subsequently completed a Master of Business Administration degree at Nanyang Technological University and a Master of Public Administration degree at the National University of Singapore's Lee Kuan Yew School of Public Policy.

== Career ==
David started his career as a host of the Channel 5 television game show, The Pyramid Game, in the 1990s and also starred in the Singaporean local sitcom Happy Belly. He was Deputy Director of the School of Design at Temasek Polytechnic before joining SJI International School as its chief executive officer in 2017.

In 2009, David became District Councillor of the North East Community Development Council.

=== Political career ===
David made his political debut in the 2015 general election as part of a six-member PAP team contesting in Ang Mo Kio GRC replacing Yeo Guat Kwang (who left the GRC to lead the Aljunied GRC team) led by Prime Minister Lee Hsien Loong against the Reform Party led by M Ravi and won with 78.63% of the vote.

David was later appointed as Deputy Chair of the Government Parliamentary Committee for Culture, Community and Youth, and Education. He also sits on the Government Parliamentary Committee for Communications and Information, and Social and Family Development.

In his maiden parliamentary speech, David suggested passing a basic English test and doing mandatory community work as additional criteria to become a Singapore citizen.

During the 2020 Budget debate, David called for more subsidies for after-school care even after children graduate from pre-school.

During the 2020 general election, David remained in the PAP team, led by Prime Minister Lee Hsien Loong, contesting Ang Mo Kio GRC against the Reform Party led by Kenneth Jeyaretnam and the team won with almost 72% of the vote.

During the 2025 general election, David remained in the PAP team, led by Senior Minister Lee Hsien Loong, contesting Ang Mo Kio GRC against People's Power Party (PPP) and new party Singapore United Party (SUP) in a three-way contest. The PAP team won the contest with almost 79 percent of the vote with the other two parties receiving around 10 percent each. David is part of the Government Parliamentary Committee under Education where he serves as chairman since 2025. David has served as the Vice-Chairman of the Ang Mo Kio Town Council (AMKTC) since 2025.

== Personal life ==
David is a Singaporean of Indian and Chinese descent with his father being an Indian and his mother a Chinese. His parents are divorced and he was raised by his mother. David is bilingual in English and Mandarin and is also able to speak conversational Hokkien.

David was married to radio personality Georgina Chang in 1998 but they later divorced. He is married to lawyer Christina Sim since 2006 and they have two children.

== Notes ==
Parliament of Singapore
Preceded by Yeo Guat Kwang; Ang Hin Kee; Inderjit Singh; Intan Azura Mokhtar; Lee Hsien Loong; Seng Han Thong	Member of Parliament for Ang Mo Kio GRC; 2015–present Served alongside: (2015 - 2020): Ang Hin Kee, Intan Azura Mokhtar, Gan Thiam Poh, Lee Hsien Loong, Koh Poh Koon (2020 - 2025): Nadia Ahmad Samdin, Ng Ling Ling, Gan Thiam Poh, Lee Hsien Loong (2025 - present): Nadia Ahmad Samdin, Jasmin Lau, Victor Lye, Lee Hsien Loong	Incumbent
