= Ang Mo Kio Group Representation Constituency =

Electoral division in Singapore

Coordinates: 1.371°N 103.86°E

Ang Mo Kio
- Group representation constituency for the Parliament of Singapore
- Region: North-East Region, Singapore
- Electorate: 161,499

Current constituency
- Created: 1991; 35 years ago
- Seats: 5
- Party: People's Action Party
- Members: Darryl David; Jasmin Lau; Lee Hsien Loong; Victor Lye; Nadia Ahmad Samdin
- Town Council: Ang Mo Kio
- Created from: Ang Mo Kio SMC; Kebun Baru SMC; Teck Ghee SMC; Yio Chu Kang SMC

The Ang Mo Kio Group Representation Constituency is a five-member group representation constituency (GRC) in north-eastern Singapore. It has five divisions: Ang Mo Kio–Hougang, Buangkok–Fernvale South, Cheng San, Seletar–Serangoon and Teck Ghee, managed by Ang Mo Kio Town Council. The current Members of Parliament (MPs) for the constituency are Darryl David, Nadia Ahmad Samdin, Acting Minister of Manpower Jasmin Lau, Victor Lye and Senior Minister Lee Hsien Loong from the governing People's Action Party (PAP).

== History ==
Ang Mo Kio GRC was created prior to the 1991 general election with four MPs. It was an amalgamation of the four single-member constituencies (SMCs) of Ang Mo Kio, Kebun Baru, Teck Ghee and Yio Chu Kang.

Prior to the 1997 general election, the GRC was expanded to have five members. For the 2001 general election, it was expanded again to have six members to include the Cheng San and Jalan Kayu divisions from the former Cheng San GRC.

During the 2006 general election, the GRC was considered a battleground as it faced its first electoral contest since its creation; all prior general elections had seen walkovers for the PAP. A group of Generation X candidates from the Workers' Party (WP), led by Yaw Shin Leong, was contesting against the PAP. Lee, the PAP anchor and then-Prime Minister, called the WP team a "suicide squad"; the WP team responded by claiming that they were not pushovers. The PAP won 66.14% of the vote.

During the 2011 general election, despite a national swing against the PAP, the PAP team won an improved 69.33% of the vote against the Reform Party (RP). At the same general election, the PAP lost Aljunied GRC to the WP.

Before the 2015 general election, Inderjit Singh and Seng Han Thong retired from politics, while Yeo Guat Kwang was redeployed to lead an ultimately defeated PAP team attempting to reclaim Aljunied GRC from the WP. Koh Poh Koon and Darryl David replaced the latter two, while Gan Thiam Poh was redeployed from Pasir Ris–Punggol GRC. The PAP won 78.64% of the vote.

Before the 2020 general election, with the abolition-in-practice of six-member GRCs, the GRC was shrunk to five members, with the Yio Chu Kang division carved out to become Yio Chu Kang SMC. Newcomers Ng Ling Ling and Nadia Ahmad Samdin joined the team while Koh, the MP for the Yio Chu Kang division, left for Tampines GRC. The PAP defeated the RP with 71.91% of the vote.

Prior to the 2025 general election, Jalan Kayu SMC was carved from Ang Mo Kio GRC. During the election, the GRC saw its first three-way contest between the incumbent PAP, the People's Power Party (PPP), and the Singapore United Party (SUP), the last of which was participating in its first general election. Lee, now the Senior Minister, continued to lead the PAP team, while Jasmin Lau, a newcomer, and Victor Lye, a former team leader for the PAP in Aljunied GRC, were fielded to replace Ng and Gan, who had retired from politics. The PAP won the contest with almost 79% of the vote; the other two parties received around 10% each. For failing to secure at least 12.5% of the vote, both PPP and SUP forfeited their election deposits.

== Members of Parliament ==
Divisions or wards of Ang Mo Kio GRC as of the 2025 general election:
1 Ang Mo Kio–Hougang
2 Buangkok–Fernvale South
3 Cheng San
4 Seletar–Serangoon
5 Teck Ghee

| Election | Division | Incumbent | Party |
Formation
| 1991 | Ang Mo Kio; Kebun Baru; Teck Ghee; Yio Chu Kang | Yeo Toon Chia; Umar Abdul Hamid; Lee Hsien Loong; Lau Ping Sum | PAP |
| 1997 | Ang Mo Kio; Kebun Baru; Nee Soon South; Teck Ghee; Yio Chu Kang | Tang Guan Seng; Inderjit Singh; Tan Boon Wan; Lee Hsien Loong; Seng Han Thong | PAP |
| 2001 | Cheng San–Seletar; Kebun Baru; Jalan Kayu; Nee Soon South; Teck Ghee; Yio Chu Kang | Balaji Sadasivan; Inderjit Singh; Wee Siew Kim; Tan Boon Wan; Lee Hsien Loong; Seng Han Thong | PAP |
| 2006 | Cheng San–Seletar; Kebun Baru; Jalan Kayu; Nee Soon South; Sengkang West; Teck Ghee | Balaji Sadasivan (2006–2010)^{1}; Inderjit Singh; Wee Siew Kim; Lee Bee Wah; Lam Pin Min; Lee Hsien Loong | PAP |
| 2011 | Ang Mo Kio–Hougang; Cheng San–Seletar; Kebun Baru; Jalan Kayu; Teck Ghee; Yio Chu Kang | Yeo Guat Kwang; Ang Hin Kee; Inderjit Singh; Intan Azura Mokhtar; Lee Hsien Loong; Seng Han Thong | PAP |
| 2015 | Ang Mo Kio–Hougang; Cheng San–Seletar; Jalan Kayu; Sengkang South; Teck Ghee; Yio Chu Kang | Darryl David; Ang Hin Kee; Intan Azura Mokhtar; Gan Thiam Poh; Lee Hsien Loong; Koh Poh Koon | PAP |
| 2020 | Ang Mo Kio–Hougang; Cheng San–Seletar; Jalan Kayu; Fernvale; Teck Ghee | Darryl David; Nadia Ahmad Samdin; Ng Ling Ling; Gan Thiam Poh; Lee Hsien Loong | PAP |
| 2025 | Ang Mo Kio–Hougang; Cheng San; Buangkok–Fernvale South; Seletar–Serangoon; Teck Ghee | Darryl David; Nadia Ahmad Samdin; Victor Lye; Jasmin Lau; Lee Hsien Loong | PAP |

== Electoral results ==
Note: The Elections Department does not include rejected votes when calculating the vote shares of candidates. Hence, all candidates' vote shares will total to 100% at any given election (may not appear so in multi-way contests due to rounding).

=== Elections in 1990s ===
General Election 1991
| Party | Candidate | Votes | % |
|---|---|---|---|
| PAP | Yeo Toon Chia; Umar Abdul Hamid; Lee Hsien Loong; Lau Pin Sum | Unopposed | |
| Registered electors | | 74,004 | |
| PAP win (new seat) | | | |

General Election 1997
| Party | Candidate | Votes | % | ±% |
|---|---|---|---|---|
| PAP | Tang Guan Seng; Inderjit Singh; Tan Boon Wan; Lee Hsien Loong; Seng Han Thong | Unopposed | | |
| Registered electors | | 125,344 | | ▲18.76 |
| PAP hold | | | | |

=== Elections in 2000s ===
General Election 2001
| Party | Candidate | Votes | % | ±% |
|---|---|---|---|---|
| PAP | Balaji Sadasivan; Inderjit Singh; Wee Siew Kim; Tan Boon Wan; Lee Hsien Loong; Seng Han Thong | Unopposed | | |
| Registered electors | | 166,644 | | ▲32.95 |
| PAP hold | | | | |

General Election 2006
| Party | Candidate | Votes | % | ±% |
|---|---|---|---|---|
| PAP | Balaji Sadasivan Inderjit Singh Wee Siew Kim Lee Bee Wah Lam Pin Min Lee Hsien Loong | 96,636 | 66.14 | N/A |
| WP | Abdul Salim Bin Harun Gopal Krishnan Han Su May Lee Wai Leng Melvin Tan Kian Hwee Yaw Shin Leong | 49,479 | 33.86 | N/A |
| Majority | | 47,157 | 32.28 | N/A |
| Total valid votes | | 146,115 | 98.00 | N/A |
| Rejected ballots | | 2,979 | 2.00 | N/A |
| Turnout | | 149,094 | 93.26 | N/A |
| Registered electors | | 159,872 | | ▼4.06 |
| PAP hold | | Swing | N/A | |

=== Elections in 2010s ===
General Election 2011
| Party | Candidate | Votes | % | ±% |
|---|---|---|---|---|
| PAP | Yeo Guat Kwang Ang Hin Kee Inderjit Singh Intan Azura Mokhtar Lee Hsien Loong Seng Han Thong | 112,677 | 69.33 | ▲3.19 |
| RP | Alex Tan Arthero Lim Vignes Ramachandran Lim Zi Rui Mansor Rahman Osman Sulaiman | 49,851 | 30.67 | N/A |
| Majority | | 62,826 | 38.66 | ▲6.38 |
| Total valid votes | | 162,528 | 97.00 | ▼1.00 |
| Rejected ballots | | 5,034 | 3.00 | ▲1.00 |
| Turnout | | 167,562 | 93.57 | ▲0.4 |
| Registered electors | | 179,071 | | ▲12.01 |
| PAP hold | | Swing | ▲3.19 | |

General Election 2015
| Party | Candidate | Votes | % | ±% |
|---|---|---|---|---|
| PAP | Darryl David Ang Hin Kee Intan Azura Mokhtar Gan Thiam Poh Lee Hsien Loong Koh Poh Koon | 135,115 | 78.63 | ▲9.30 |
| RP | Gilbert Goh Jesse Loo Roy Ngerng M Ravi Osman Sulaiman Siva Chandran | 36,711 | 21.37 | ▼9.30 |
| Majority | | 98,404 | 57.26 | ▲18.60 |
| Total valid votes | | 171,826 | 97.23 | ▲0.23 |
| Rejected ballots | | 4,893 | 2.77 | ▼0.23 |
| Turnout | | 176,713 | 94.11 | ▲0.51 |
| Registered electors | | 187,771 | | ▲4.86 |
| PAP hold | | Swing | ▲9.3 | |

=== Elections in 2020s ===
General Election 2020
| Party | Candidate | Votes | % | ±% |
|---|---|---|---|---|
| PAP | Darryl David Gan Thiam Poh Lee Hsien Loong Nadia Ahmad Samdin Ng Ling Ling | 124,597 | 71.91 | ▼6.72 |
| RP | Andy Zhu Noraini Yunus Kenneth Jeyaretnam Charles Yeo Darren Soh | 48,677 | 28.09 | ▲6.72 |
| Majority | | 75,920 | 43.81 | ▼13.45 |
| Total valid votes | | 173,274 | 97.19 | ▼0.04 |
| Rejected ballots | | 5,016 | 2.81 | ▲0.04 |
| Turnout | | 178,290 | 96.24 | ▲2.13 |
| Registered electors | | 185,261 | | ▼1.34 |
| PAP hold | | Swing | ▼6.72 | |

General Election 2025
| Party | Candidate | Votes | % | ±% |
|---|---|---|---|---|
| PAP | Darryl David Jasmin Lau Lee Hsien Loong Victor Lye Nadia Ahmad Samdin | 115,562 | 78.95 | ▲7.04 |
| SUP | Andy Zhu Nigel Ng Noraini Yunus Chandran Sanmugam Vincent Ng | 15,874 | 10.85 | N/A |
| PPP | William Lim Martinn Ho Thaddeus Thomas Samuel Lee Heng Zheng Dao | 14,929 | 10.20 | N/A |
| Majority | | 99,688 | 68.10 | ▲24.29 |
| Total valid votes | | 146,365 | 97.08 | ▼0.11 |
| Rejected ballots | | 4,399 | 2.91 | ▲0.11 |
| Turnout | | 150,764 | 93.35 | ▼2.89 |
| Registered electors | | 161,499 | | ▼12.83 |
| PAP hold | | Swing | ▲7.04 | |
