= Ang Hin Kee =

Singaporean politician

- 洪鼎基

Member of Parliament for Ang Mo Kio GRC
- In office 7 May 2011 – 23 June 2020
- Preceded by: PAP held
- Succeeded by: PAP held
- Majority: 2011: 62,826 (38.66%); 2015: 98,404 (57.26%)

Personal details
- Born: 22 October 1965 (age 60) Singapore
- Party: People's Action Party

Ang Hin Kee (Chinese: 洪鼎基; pinyin: Hóng Dǐngjī; Pe̍h-ōe-jī: Âng Téng-ki; born 22 October 1965) is a Singaporean former politician. A former member of the governing People's Action Party (PAP), Ang was the Member of Parliament (MP), as part of different PAP teams, representing Ang Mo Kio Group Representation Constituency between 2011 and 2020.

From 2012 to 2018, Ang was the executive secretary of the Education Services Union (ESU). He is also serving as the advisor to NTUC's Freelancers and Self-Employed Unit, National Instructors and Coaches Association, National Taxi Association and National Private Hire Vehicles Association. Ang is the chief executive officer of the Singapore National Co-operative Federation. Concurrently, he is also the assistant director-general of National Trades Union Congress (NTUC), and the director of governance, risk, & compliance within NTUC.

== Early life and education ==
Ang was born in Singapore on 22 October 1965. He attended Kwong Avenue Primary School, graduating in 1977. He studied at Bartley Secondary School and Jurong Junior College. Thereafter, he obtained a BA with honours from the National University of Singapore in 1991.

== Career ==
In May 1991, Ang joined the Police Headquarters in Singapore as a project and licensing officer. He held this position till December 1993. From February 1994 to September 1999, he served as manager of the Singapore Tourism Board. Subsequently, Ang worked at many other organisations, including the Singapore Badminton Association and the Singapore Sports Council. Since 2012, Ang has been working at the National Taxi Association as its advisor. He has also been the Education Services Union's Executive Secretary since the same year.

He is also the assistant director-General of NTUC, and the director of governance, risk, & compliance within NTUC.

In November 2020, Ang succeeded Dolly Goh as the chief executive officer of the Singapore National Co-operative Federation, where he and his team drive programmes and initiatives to build stronger and resilient co-operatives in Singapore.

== Political career ==
A member of the PAP, Ang was an MP for the Ang Mo Kio GRC from 7 May 2011, following the general election of that year. He was a member of the Ministry of Transport and the Ministry of Social and Family Development. In 2020, Ang did not run for the 2020 Singaporean general election, with an update from his former GRC team that he would be retiring.

Parliament of Singapore
Preceded by Balaji Sadasivan; Inderjit Singh; Wee Siew Kim; Lee Bee Wah; Lam Pin Min; Lee Hsien Loong	Member of Parliament for Ang Mo Kio GRC; 2011 – 2020; Served alongside: (2011 – 2015): Yeo Guat Kwang, Inderjit Singh, Intan Azura Mokhtar, Lee Hsien Loong and Seng Han Thong (20115 – 2020): Koh Poh Koon, Intan Azura Mokhtar, Gan Thiam Poh and Lee Hsien Loong	Succeeded by Darryl David; Nadia Ahmad Samdin; Ng Ling Ling; Gan Thiam Poh; Lee Hsien Loong
