= Lam Pin Min =

Singaporean politician (born 1969)

- 蓝彬明
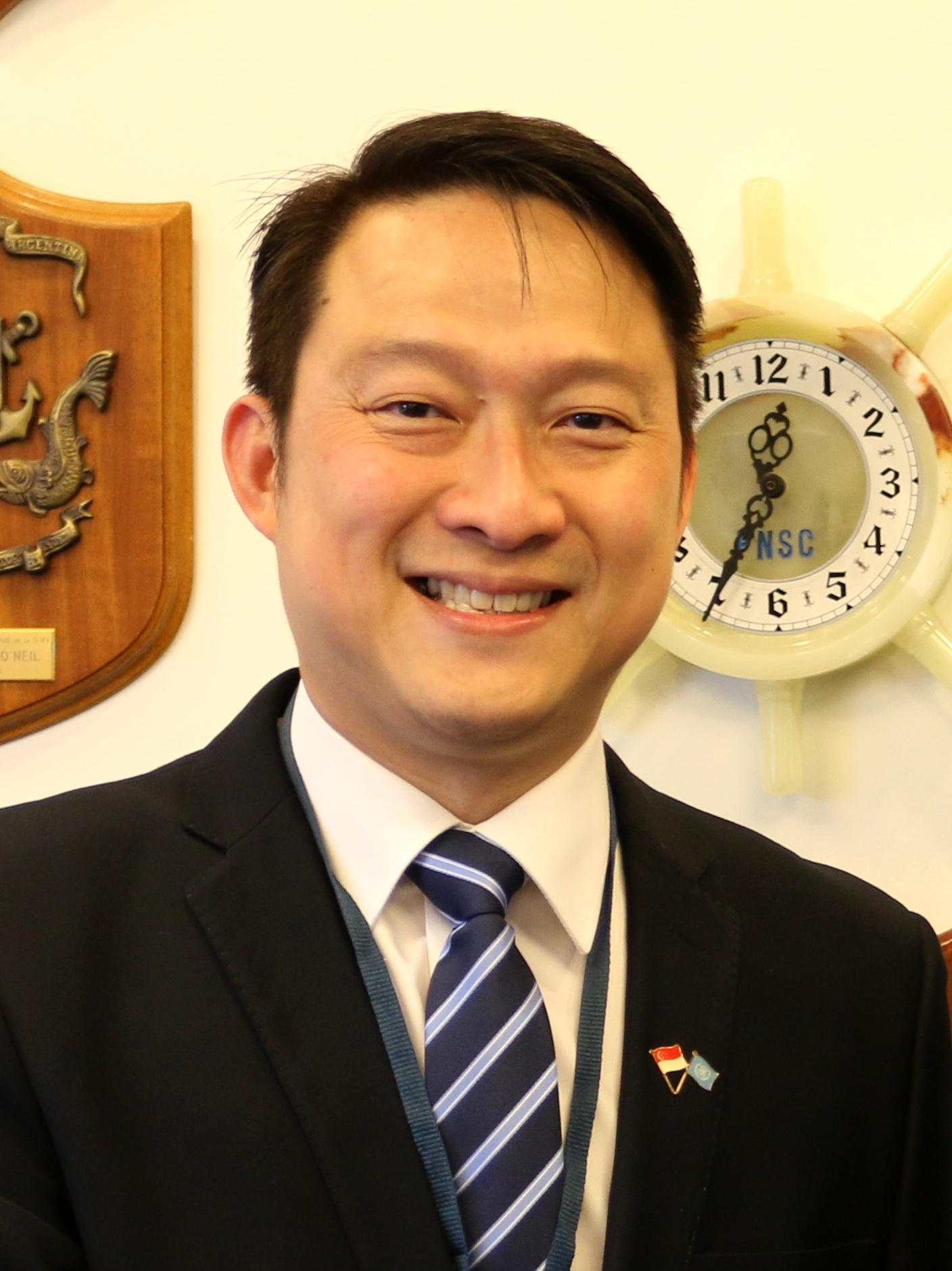
- Lam in 2018

Member of Parliament for Sengkang West SMC
- In office 7 May 2011 – 23 June 2020
- Preceded by: Constituency established
- Succeeded by: Constituency abolished
- Majority: 2011: 4,098 (16.22%); 2015: 6,848 (24.22%)

Member of Parliament for Ang Mo Kio GRC
- In office 6 May 2006 – 19 April 2011
- Preceded by: PAP held
- Succeeded by: PAP held
- Majority: 47,157 (32.28%)

Personal details
- Born: Lam Pin Min; 1 September 1969 (age 57) Singapore
- Party: People's Action Party
- Children: 2
- Education: National University of Singapore (MBBS, MMed); Royal College of Physicians
- Occupation: Medical practitioner; politician
- Profession: Ophthalmologist

Military service
- Branch/service: Republic of Singapore Air Force
- Years of service: 1995–2003
- Unit: SAF Medical Corps

Lam Pin Min (Note: Chinese: 蓝彬明; Pha̍k-fa-sṳ: Làm Pìn-mìn; pinyin: Lán Bīnmíng) (born 1 September 1969) is a Singaporean ophthalmologist and politician who served as Senior Minister of State for Health and Senior Minister of State for Transport between 2017 and 2020. A member of the governing People's Action Party (PAP), he was the Member of Parliament (MP) for the Sengkang West division of Ang Mo Kio Group Representation Constituency (GRC) between 2006 and 2011, and Sengkang West Single Member Constituency (SMC) between 2011 and 2020.

In the 2020 general election, he was part of the four-member PAP team for the newly created Sengkang GRC, led by Ng Chee Meng. They lost to He Ting Ru's team representing the opposition Workers' Party (WP).

== Education ==
Lam attended Anglo-Chinese School and National Junior College before graduating from Yong Loo Lin School of Medicine at the National University of Singapore in 1993.

After completing medical school, Lam joined the Singapore Armed Forces (SAF) as a regular medical officer in 1995. Whilst in service, he obtained his postgraduate diploma in aviation medicine from the Royal College of Physicians in 1997.

Lam subsequently went on to become a fellow in the Royal College of Surgeons of Edinburgh and complete a Master of Medicine degree in ophthalmology at the National University of Singapore in 2000.

== Career ==
=== Military career ===
Lam was trained as an aviation medicine specialist and served the Republic of Singapore Air Force (RSAF) as a medical officer and flight surgeon between 1995 and 2003. He held various appointments in the RSAF, including Officer Commanding in an airbase medical centre and Branch Head of the RSAF Aeromedical Centre. He also spent 3 months serving as the medical commander of the Singapore Medical Contingent, serving in the United Nations Military Hospital in Timor-Leste before its independence in 2000.

=== Private practice ===
Lam worked as a pediatric ophthalmologist at KK Women's and Children's Hospital, Singapore National Eye Centre, and Eagle Eye Centre. Lam sits on the Civil Aviation Medical Board and is the Adviser to the Society of Aviation Medicine, Singapore.

After his electoral defeat in the 2020 general election, Lam joined Eagle Eye Centre as chief executive officer and Director of the Paediatric Ophthalmology and Adult Strabismus Service, and Senior Advisor of Lumens Auto on 1 September and 27 October 2020 respectively.

=== Political career ===
Lam made his political debut in the 2006 general election as part of a six-member PAP team for Ang Mo Kio GRC led by Prime Minister Lee Hsien Loong; the team defeated the WP with 66.14% of the vote. He was subsequently assigned to the Sengkang West division.

In the 2011 general election, Lam contested in the newly created Sengkang West SMC after it was created from his Sengkang West division; he defeated WP candidate Koh Choong Yong with 58.1% of the vote.

In the 2015 general election, Lam stood for re-election in Sengkang West SMC; he won an improved 62.1% of the vote in a rematch against Koh.

Lam served as the chairman of the Government Parliamentary Committee for Health between 2009 and 2014, having previously served as the deputy chairman between 2006 and 2008.

In August 2014, Lam was appointed Minister of State for Health.

Subsequently, in May 2017, Lam was appointed Senior Minister of State for Health and Senior Minister of State for Transport.

During the 2020 general election, Lam contested in the newly created Sengkang GRC, which comprised parts of Pasir Ris–Punggol GRC and his now-defunct Sengkang West SMC, along with the entire Punggol East SMC, but lost with 47.88% of the vote. This was the second time the PAP had lost to the opposition in a GRC since the WP gained Aljunied GRC in 2011, as well as the first time the opposition had won a newly created GRC.

Lam stood again in Sengkang GRC in the 2025 general election, leading three political newcomers. His team lost to the WP with 43.68% of the vote, a decrease of over 4% from 2020.

==== Controversies ====
In January 2015, Lam was involved in a controversy in which Build-to-Order (BTO) residents in the Fernvale Lea estate, in his constituency, were not informed of plans to build a columbarium next to their block. He upset residents further when seen sitting at the same table as the contractors at a Meet-the-People Session (MPS). Minister for National Development Khaw Boon Wan later told Parliament that there would be no commercial columbarium at the site.

In February 2018, it was revealed that Lam had sent an appeal letter directly to the State Courts to help Tang Ling Lee, a resident of Sengkang West SMC, who had been sentenced to one week's imprisonment for seriously injuring a motorcyclist in a road traffic accident. Justice See Kee Oon of the High Court dismissed the appeal, saying that the letter trivialised the injuries sustained by the rider and contradicted the statement of facts Tang had previously agreed to. This incident led to many netizens questioning why Lam, both a legislative and executive member of the government, was overstepping his duty by interfering with the judiciary. Such letters were to be sent to the Attorney-General's Chambers and not the Courts. In response, PAP whip Chan Chun Sing wrote a letter to PAP MPs, saying that they should not write letters of appeal to the courts to prevent "any misperception that they [could] influence or interfere in the judicial process”.

== Personal life ==
Lam is a Chinese Singaporean of Hakka descent.

== Notes ==
Parliament of Singapore
| Preceded by Balaji Sadasivan; Inderjit Singh; Wee Siew Kim; Tan Boon Wan; Lee Hsien Loong; Seng Han Thong | Member of Parliament for Ang Mo Kio GRC; 2006 – 2011; Served alongside: Balaji Sadasivan, Inderjit Singh, Wee Siew Kim, Lee Bee Wah and Lee Hsien Loong | Succeeded by Yeo Guat Kwang; Ang Hin Kee; Inderjit Singh; Intan Azura Mokhtar; Lee Hsien Loong; Seng Han Thong |
| New constituency | Member of Parliament for Sengkang West SMC; 2011 – 2020 | Constituency abolished |
