= Intan Azura Mokhtar =

Singaporean politician

Member of Parliament for Ang Mo Kio GRC
- In office 10 October 2011 – 23 June 2020
- Preceded by: PAP held
- Succeeded by: PAP held
- Majority: 2011: 62,826 (38.66%); 2015: 98,404 (57.26%)

Personal details
- Born: 27 June 1976 (age 50) Singapore
- Party: People's Action Party
- Children: 3
- Education: National University of Singapore; Nanyang Technological University

Intan Azura binte Mokhtar (born 27 June 1976) is a Singaporean former politician. A former member of the governing People's Action Party (PAP), Intan was the Member of Parliament (MP), as part of different PAP teams, representing Ang Mo Kio Group Representation Constituency (GRC) between 2011 and 2020.

On 30 June 2020, Intan announced her retirement from politics to focus more on her health, her family, and her personal and professional growth in the next half of her life.

== Education ==
Intan graduated with a bachelor's degree in physics from the National University of Singapore (NUS) before moving on to complete a postgraduate diploma in education at the National Institute of Education in Nanyang Technological University (NTU). She obtained a Master of Science and Doctor of Philosophy in information studies from NTU's Wee Kim Wee School of Communication and Information. She also holds a Master of Public Administration from NUS's Lee Kuan Yew School of Public Policy.

== Career ==
Intan started volunteering in 2006 at Mendaki, where she assisted in a scholarships interview panel and empowerment programme for girls. Later on, she volunteered at, and sat on the board of directors of the Singapore Muslim Women's Association. She also volunteered at The Singapore Children's Society and served as an advisor in its research committee.

Intan was a council member of Majlis Ugama Islam Singapura (MUIS) from August 2010 to March 2011. She is currently an Associate Professor in the Design and Specialised Businesses cluster, and concurrently the Director of the Community Leadership and Social Innovation Centre (CLASIC) at the Singapore Institute of Technology.

=== Political career ===
Intan started her political career in the Young PAP, the youth wing of the PAP. She contested the 2011 General Election as part of a six-member PAP team in Ang Mo Kio GRC. The team, led by the PAP's Secretary-General Lee Hsien Loong, won 69.33% of the votes. Intan then became a Member of Parliament representing Ang Mo Kio GRC.

In 2015, Intan, along with Lee and four others, contested in the 2015 general elections for in Ang Mo Kio GRC and won over 78% of the votes. She is also an advisor for the Youth PAP Community Sub-Committee.

In 2020, during the initial announcement of "circuit breaker" lockdown measures restricting movement and business activities, inclusive of home-based businesses, in 2020. There was initial confusion over the measures affecting home-based food-business. The measures affected the Malay community as such home-based food-business are an important source of income for the community during Ramadan. It was later clarified by the Ministry of Trade and Industry, the Ministry of the Environment and Water Resources, the Housing and Development Board (HDB) and the Urban Redevelopment Authority in a joint statement saying that home-based food-business need to meet certain criteria to operate during the lockdown measures.

After a few days, National Development Minister Lawrence Wong eased the lockdown measures for home-based food-business operators if they followed certain safety measures such as contactless delivery of orders, among other things. During Parliament, Intan spoke up for the home-based food-business and asked why the government decided to “back-pedal” on the measures which Minister for Social and Family Development and Minister-in-charge of Muslim Affairs Masagos Zulkifli denied, saying it had to make “tough choices between preserving livelihoods and preserving life itself”.

In June 2020, Intan announced her retirement from politics to focus more on her health, her family, and her personal and professional growth in the next half of her life.

== Personal life ==
Intan is married and has three children – two boys and a girl.

Parliament of Singapore
| Preceded by Balaji Sadasivan; Inderjit Singh; Wee Siew Kim; Lee Bee Wah; Lam Pin Min; Lee Hsien Loong | Member of Parliament for Ang Mo Kio GRC; 2011 – 2020; Served alongside: (2011 – 2015): Yeo Guat Kwang, Inderjit Singh, Ang Hin Kee, Lee Hsien Loong and Seng Han Thong (20115 – 2020): Koh Poh Koon, Ang Hin Kee, Gan Thiam Poh and Lee Hsien Loong | Succeeded by Darryl David; Nadia Ahmad Samdin; Ng Ling Ling; Gan Thiam Poh; Lee Hsien Loong |
