= Penny Low =

Singaporean politician

- 刘𨮒琳
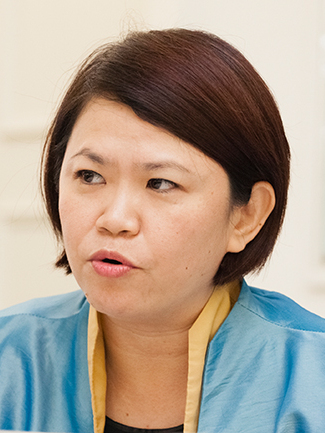
- Low speaking at the Horasis Global China Business Meeting in 2019

Member of the Singapore Parliament for Pasir Ris–Punggol GRC
- In office 25 October 2001 – 25 August 2015
- Preceded by: Constiutuency established
- Succeeded by: PAP held
- Majority: 2001: N/A (walkover); 2006: 61,704 (37.40%); 2011: 45,892 (29.58%)

Personal details
- Born: Penny Low; 12 June 1967 (age 59) Singapore
- Party: People's Action Party

Penny Low (Note: Chinese: 刘𨮒琳; pinyin: Liú Mènglín) (born 12 June 1967) is a Singaporean businesswoman and former politician. A member of the People's Action Party (PAP), she was the Member of Parliament (MP) for the Pasir Ris–Punggol Group Representation Constituency (GRC) for Punggol North from 25 October 2001 to 11 September 2015. She pioneered various movements and founded various enterprises and not-profit organisations like the Social Innovation Park and the Social Enterprise Association.

Low is a Yale World Fellow.

== Early life and education ==
Low was born in Singapore.

Low graduated from the National University of Singapore in 1990 and went on to obtain the Chartered Financial Consultant and Chartered Life Underwriter designation.

== Career ==
From 1990 to 1993, Low worked at the Singapore Broadcasting Corporation (SBC) as a producer. She became a hitch hiker and travelled the world before returning to freelance as a producer. She worked as a financial Consultant and trainer since 1995, and anchored a television program on financial management and wealth planning. Low also worked as an adjunct lecturer for S'pore Institute of Management-Royal Melbourne Institute of Technology. In 2006, she founded Social Innovation Parks, a non-profit organisation supporting social entrepreneurs, and the Social Enterprise Association. Since then, she has been serving as the organisations' chief on a pro bono basis.

Low was led into public service by her lecturer in school and former Senior Minister of State Aline Wong. Low contested as a candidate for the Pasir Ris–Punggol GRC, during the 2001 general elections under the People's Action Party. She served as a member of parliament for the group constituency, a position she held for three terms from 2001 to 2015 before she retired from politics.

== See also ==
- List of Singapore MPs
