= Inderjit Singh (Singaporean politician) =

Singaporean politician

- ਇੰਦਰਜੀਤ ਸਿੰਘ

Member of the Singapore Parliament for Ang Mo Kio GRC
- In office 23 December 1996 – 25 August 2015
- Preceded by: PAP held
- Succeeded by: PAP held
- Majority: 1996: N/A (walkover); 2001: N/A (walkover); 2006: 47,157 (32.28%); 2011: 62,826 (38.66%)

Personal details
- Born: Inderjit Singh Dhaliwal; 6 June 1960 (age 66) Punjab, India
- Party: People's Action Party
- Education: University of Strathclyde; Nanyang Technological University
- Profession: Engineer

Inderjit Singh Dhaliwal (Note: Punjabi: ਇੰਦਰਜੀਤ ਸਿੰਘ ਧਾਲੀਵਾਲ, romanized: Indarjīt Siṅgh Dhālīvāl) (born 5 June 1960) is Singaporean entrepreneur and former politician. He was a Member of Parliament for Ang Mo Kio GRC from 1996 to 2015.

== Early life ==
Born in Punjab, India, Singh came to Singapore when he was 10 months old.

== Education ==
Singh attended Kaki Bukit Primary School in Singapore and then progressed to Broadrick Secondary School and Temasek Junior College. He began his university education with a Bachelor of Engineering from Nanyang Technological University (NTU) in Electrical and Electronics. He graduated with honours from the institution in 1985. While at NTU he founded the EEE Club and was the first chairman of the NTU Students' Union Council. He also helped start the NTI Alumni Association (later became NTUAC).

After earning his bachelors, he continued his education at the University of Strathclyde in Scotland, earning an MBA in 1991. He received an honorary doctorate from Amity University in 2018.

== Career ==
=== Corporate career ===
Singh began his career with Texas Instruments, beginning as an engineer in 1985 and spent 13 years ascending the corporate ladder before becoming Director of Operations of the Singapore plant from 1996 to 1998. After his stint with Texas Instruments, Singh began a career of entrepreneurship, in which he started six businesses after leaving the corporate arena. He founded the United Test and Assembly Center (UTAC), a semiconductor firm, in 1998 valued at US$2 billion in 2001. The venture was mostly funded by Taiwanese friends of his due to what he terms "a dearth of willing investors and a general disbelief that he would be able to achieve his dream of creating a homegrown multinational firm.". He raised a record of US$138m, all at one go, at the seeds stage in 1998. Inderjit left UTAC in 2001. The firm was listed on the Singapore Stock Exchange in 2004.

Around the same time he started UTAC, he started, Tri-Star, which he started with his brothers as trading and services firm, in which much of his and his family's savings were used to fund the company. Today Tri Star is present in 38 countries in Africa as a distributor of Consumer Electronic products. Inderjit subsequently also set-up semiconductor engineering firm Infiniti Solutions in 2001. Infiniti at its peak had operations in the Silicon Valley, USA, in Austin Texas, a factory in Philippines and with the HQ in Singapore. More recently, he founded Solstar International, a Singapore-based consumer electronics products company, of which he is currently the CEO. Solstar is a Singapore-based Consumer Electronics brand selling in 25 countries in Africa and other developing countries around Asia. In 2009, Inderjit, helped start Urah Transdermal, a Singapore-based Life-Science Research and product Company that has Developed and patented technologies for the delivery of active molecules through the skin barriers to biological targets.

He is a co-president of the World Entrepreneurship Forum, a global organisation on entrepreneurship development. He has also been actively driving the transformation of the entrepreneurship landscape and helping to shape policies to better support start-ups, small and medium businesses in Singapore and has been a board member of Spring Singapore (Enterprise Singapore today) and vice-chairman of the Action Community for Entrepreneurship (ACE). He was also a board member of the Urban Redevelopment Authority (URA) for 8 years where he also Chaired the Audit committee of URA.

Inderjit is currently a member of the Board of Trustees of the Nanyang Technological University (NTU) and also is the chairman of the board of NTUitive, the Innovation company of NTU. He is also the Chairman of the Alumni and Development committee, a board committee of NTU. He is also a member of the International Advisory Panel of EMLyon, a premier business school in France. Inderjit is a board member of the World Business Angel Forum. Inderjit was appointed as an adjunct professor by the Nanyang Technological University, College of Engineering in 2019.

He is the author of the popular book, "The Art and Science of Entrepreneurship", which captures his entrepreneurial experiences.

Singh received the Nanyang Distinguished Alumni award in 2011 from NTU and was awarded the Public Service Medal in 2016 by the government of Singapore as part of its annual National Day awards. He received the Strathclyde Alumni Distinguished Entrepreneur Award in 2013

=== Political career ===
Singh became an active grassroots leader in 1984. He became a member of parliament for the Kebun Baru ward in the Ang Mo Kio GRC, in the Prime Minister's team, since the 1997 General Elections.

As a member of parliament, Inderjit was a Deputy Government Whip from 2002 to 2011 and also the Chairman of the Government Parliamentary Committee of the Ministries of Finance and Trade and Industry.

On 2 January 2013, Singh asked to step down from his political positions and on 24 July 2015, before the 2015 Singaporean general election, Singh announced his stepping down from politics.

During the February 2013 parliamentary debate on the Population White Paper, Singh was one of the few PAP MPs to publicly criticise the projected 6.9 million population figure, calling for a "five-year breather" on immigration. He was absent for the vote on the White Paper, effectively abstaining — the only PAP MP not to vote for it.

== Notes ==
Parliament of Singapore
Preceded by Yeo Toon Chia; Umar Abdul Hamid; Lee Hsien Loong; Lau Ping Sum	Member of Parliament for Ang Mo Ko GRC; 1997–2015; Served alongside: (1997 – 2001): Tang Guan Seng, Seng Han Thong, Tan Boon Wan and Lee Hsien Loong (2001 - 2006): Balaji Sadasivan, Seng Han Thong, Wee Siew Kim, Tan Boon Wan and Lee Hsien Loong (2006 - 2011): Balaji Sadasivan, Seng Han Thong, Wee Siew Kim, Lee Bee Wah, Lam Pin Min and Lee Hsien Loong (2011 - 2015):Yeo Guat Kwang, Ang Hin Kee, Intan Azura Mokhtar, Seng Han Thong and Lee Hsien Loong	Succeeded by Darryl David; Ang Hin Kee; Intan Azura Mokhtar; Gan Thiam Poh; Koh Poh Koon; Lee Hsien Loong
