= Yeo Guat Kwang =

Singaporean politician

- 杨木光

Member of the Singapore Parliament for Ang Mo Kio GRC
- In office 7 May 2011 – 25 August 2015
- Preceded by: PAP held
- Succeeded by: PAP held
- Majority: 62,826 (38.66%)

Member of the Singapore Parliament for Aljunied GRC
- In office 3 November 2001 – 19 April 2011
- Preceded by: PAP held
- Succeeded by: WP gain
- Majority: 2001: N/A (walkover); 2006: 16,250 (12.18%)

Member of the Singapore Parliament for Cheng San GRC
- In office 2 January 1997 – 18 October 2001
- Preceded by: PAP held
- Succeeded by: Constituency abolished
- Majority: 9,421 (9.64%)

Personal details
- Born: Yeo Guat Kwang; 27 January 1961 (age 65) State of Singapore
- Other political affiliations: People's Action Party (1997–2015)
- Education: National University of Singapore; National Institute of Education

Yeo Guat Kwang (Note: Chinese: 杨木光; Pe̍h-ūe-jī: Iôⁿ Ba̍k-kuang; pinyin: Yáng Mùguāng) (born 27 January 1961) is a Singaporean former politician. A former member of the governing People's Action Party (PAP), Yeo was the Member of Parliament (MP), as part of different PAP teams, representing Cheng San Group Representation Constituency (GRC) between 1997 and 2001, Aljunied GRC between 2001 and 2011, and Ang Mo Kio GRC between 2011 and 2015.

== Education ==
Yeo attended The Chinese High School and Nanyang Junior College, before graduating from the National University of Singapore in 1986 with a Bachelor of Arts degree in social sciences.

He subsequently went on to complete a postgraduate diploma in education at the National Institute of Education at the Nanyang Technological University in 1987.

He also completed a joint programme at the NUS Business School and Lee Kuan Yew School of Public Policy with a Master in Public Administration and Management degree in 2013.

== Career ==
=== Education ===
Yeo started his career in 1987 as a teacher at Nanyang Junior College, and in 1991, he became a Head of Department at Anderson Secondary School. From 1993 to 1996, he was a Specialist Inspector for Chinese at the Ministry of Education.

=== Labour movement ===
In 1997, Yeo joined the labour movement as an Executive Secretary for the Building Construction and Timber Industries Employees Union (BATU). In 2001, he became the Executive Secretary for the Singapore Industrial and Services Employees Union (SISEU), as well as the Amalgamated Union of Statutory Board Employees (AUSBE).

In January 2014, Yeo was appointed Assistant Secretary-General (ASG) in the National Trades Union Congress (NTUC), which has close ties with the PAP.

In December 2016, Yeo was promoted to Assistant Director-General in NTUC.

Yeo is also the chairman of the NTUC's Migrant Workers' Centre, which was set up in 2009. He is also the head of the Centre for Domestic Employees, and the director for Workplace Safety and Health.

Yeo was president of the Consumers Association of Singapore (CASE), a consumer advocacy group founded by the NTUC, from 2002 until June 2012.

=== Political career ===
In the 1997 general election, Yeo made his political debut in Cheng San GRC as part of a five-member PAP team; said team won 54.82% of the vote against the Workers' Party (WP). He subsequently became the MP for the Punggol South division until 2001, when the GRC was abolished.

In the 2001 general election, with Cheng San GRC abolished, Yeo joined a five-member PAP team in Aljunied GRC, which won in a walkover; he became the MP for the Aljunied–Hougang division. He retained his seat in the 2006 general election after the PAP team for Aljunied GRC won 56.09% of the vote against the WP.

In the 2011 general election, after his Aljunied–Hougang division was shifted to Ang Mo Kio GRC and renamed Ang Mo Kio–Hougang, Yeo joined a six-member PAP team for said GRC, which won 69.33% of the vote; he continued to represent the Ang Mo Kio–Hougang division until 2015. It was at the same election that the PAP lost Aljunied GRC to the WP.

In the 2015 general election, Yeo was redeployed to his former Aljunied GRC, leading four political newcomers in a bid to retake it; however, the WP narrowly retained the GRC with a majority of 1.9%, or 2,612 votes. As the PAP team had requested a recount, given that the WP's initially calculated majority was under 2%, the result for Aljunied GRC was only declared around 3.10am the morning after Election Day. It was later revealed that the PAP had won in the divisions of Serangoon and Paya Lebar, which Yeo and Murali Pillai would respectively have represented, by around 300 votes each.

Yeo retired from politics prior to the 2020 general election.

=== Civil career ===
As of August 2017, Yeo was a board member at the now-defunct Agri-Food and Veterinary Authority of Singapore. He also used to be a board member at the Public Utilities Board, Land Transport Authority, and SPRING Singapore.

=== Private sector ===
Yeo held directorships in Asiagate Holdings and SIIC Environment Holding as of August 2017. He retired from the board of SIIC in 2024.

He had been a director before in other private companies.

== Personal life ==
Yeo is of Teochew descent; his ancestral hometown is Chao'an, Chaozhou.

== Notes ==
Parliament of Singapore
Preceded by Lee Yock Suan; Sitaram Chandra Das; Heng Chiang Meng; Michael Lim Chun Leng	Member of Parliament for Cheng San GRC; 1996– 2001	Constituency abolished
Preceded by Toh See Kiat; David Lim; Sidek Saniff; George Yeo; Ker Sin Tze	Member of Parliament for Aljunied GRC; 2001 – 2011; Served alongside: (2001 - 2006): Ong Seh Hong, Zainul Abidin, George Yeo and Cynthia Phua (2006 - 2011): George Yeo, Zainul Abidin, Cynthia Phua and Lim Hwee Hua	Succeeded by Low Thia Khiang; Pritam Singh; Faisal Manap; Chen Show Mao; Sylvia Lim
Preceded by Balaji Sadasivan; Inderjit Singh; Wee Siew Kim; Lee Bee Wah; Lam Pin Min; Lee Hsien Loong	Member of Parliament for Ang Mo Kio GRC; 2011 – 2015; Served alongside: Ang Hin Kee, Inderjit Singh, Intan Azura Mokhtar, Lee Hsien Loong and Seng Han Thong	Succeeded by Darryl David; Ang Hin Kee; Intan Azura Mokhtar; Gan Thiam Poh; Lee Hsien Loong; Koh Poh Koon
