= Results of the 2025 Singaporean general election =

This is a breakdown of the results of the 2025 Singaporean general election. At the end of nominations, 92 of the 97 seats up for election were contested, with Marine Parade–Braddell Heights Group Representation Constituency (GRC) being the first constituency to see a walkover since 2011. (Note: 131,493 of the 2,758,095 registered voters (including 1,152 overseas voters) were in the uncontested Marine Parade–Braddell Heights GRC, leaving 2,626,602 voters able to vote.)

A sample count, which had been in use since the 2015 general election, was released by the Elections Department (ELD) prior to the announcement of the actual results; the official rationale for the counts is to prevent speculation or reliance on unofficial sources of information during the counting process. With changes in the last election, an election recount was set to be automatically deployed in cases where the top two candidates had a winning margin within 2%; standby counting machines were also to be used.

The results were announced by returning officer Han Kok Juan, the Director-General of the Civil Aviation Authority of Singapore. At 23:10 SGT, Radin Mas Single Member Constituency (SMC), which had re-elected Melvin Yong, was the first constituency to be called. At 23:19, Han incorrectly announced that Eric Chua, the candidate for the governing People's Action Party (PAP) in Queenstown SMC, had garnered 29,900 votes; he re-announced at 23:37 that Chua had garnered 20,900 votes. All the results were announced by 01:46, with Tampines GRC being the last constituency to be called.

The overseas votes were tabulated on 15 May, two days after the deadline of accepting postal votes and 12 days after the election ended. The final turnout was set at 2,438,610 (92.83%), with 42,945 rejected votes.

== Nationwide ==
Popular vote
1. PAP (65.6%)
2. WP (15.0%)
3. PSP (4.88%)
4. RDU (3.96%)
5. SDP (3.72%)
6. PAR (2.51%)
7. Others (4.36%)
Elected seats won
1. 5 seats (PAP; uncontested) (5.15%)
2. 82 seats (PAP; contested) (84.5%)
3. 10 seats (WP) (10.3%)

Party	Votes	%	+/–	Seats			
Party	Votes	%	+/–	Fielded	Elected	NCMP	+/−
People's Action Party	1,570,803	65.57	+4.35	97	87	0	▲4
Workers' Party	359,161	14.99	+3.77	26	10	2	▲2
Progress Singapore Party	117,005	4.88	−5.30	13	0	0	▼2
Red Dot United	94,955	3.96	+2.71	15	0	0	0
Singapore Democratic Party	89,053	3.72	−0.73	11	0	0	0
People's Alliance for Reform	60,207	2.51	New	13	0	0	New
Singapore Democratic Alliance	29,213	1.22	−0.27	4	0	0	0
Singapore People's Party	28,205	1.18	−0.34	5	0	0	0
Singapore United Party	15,874	0.66	New	5	0	0	New
People's Power Party	15,525	0.65	−0.35	10	0	0	0
Independents	12,537	0.52	+0.49	2	0	0	0
National Solidarity Party	3,127	0.13	−3.62	10	0	0	0
Total	2,395,665	100.00	–	211	97	2	0
Valid votes	2,395,665	98.24					
Invalid/blank votes	42,945	1.76					
Total votes	2,438,610	100.00					
Registered voters/turnout	2,627,026	92.83					
Source: calculation based on https://www.eld.gov.sg/finalresults2025.html

Opposition parties contested vote
Party	Votes
Workers'	50.06%
PSP	36.25%
SDA	32.32%
SDP	30.88%
Independents	29.37%
SPP	26.26%
RDU	23.36%
PAR	19.08%
SUP	10.85%
PPP	5.47%
NSP	1.19%

== By constituency ==
Candidates and results of the 2025 Singaporean general election
Division	Seat	Voters	Rejected	Party	Candidate(s)	Votes	Votes %	Swing	Overseas vote difference	Margins
Aljunied GRC	5	133,451	1,341	Workers' Party	Pritam Singh; Sylvia Lim; Gerald Giam; Fadli Fawzi; Kenneth Tiong	78,847	59.68 / 100	▼0.24	▲0.03	19.36%
Aljunied GRC	5	133,451	1,341	People's Action Party	Chan Hui Yuh; Adrian Ang; Faisal Abdul Aziz; Jagathishwaran Rajo; Daniel Liu	53,263	40.32 / 100	▲0.24	▼0.03	19.36%
Ang Mo Kio GRC	5	150,312	4,399	People's Action Party	Lee Hsien Loong; Darryl David; Jasmin Lau; Victor Lye; Nadia Ahmad Samdin	115,562	78.95 / 100	▲7.04	Steady	68.11%
Ang Mo Kio GRC	5	150,312	4,399	Singapore United Party (lost $67,500 deposit)	Vincent Ng; Nigel Ng; Noraini Yunus; Ridhuan Chandran; Andy Zhu	15,874	10.84 / 100	—N/a	Steady	68.11%
Ang Mo Kio GRC	5	150,312	4,399	People's Power Party (lost $67,500 deposit)	Heng Zheng Dao; Martinn Ho; Samuel Lee; William Lim; Thaddeus Thomas	14,929	10.21 / 100	—N/a	Steady	68.11%
Bishan–Toa Payoh GRC	4	90,020	2,092	People's Action Party	Chee Hong Tat; Cai Yinzhou; Elysa Chen; Saktiandi Supaat	66,455	75.18 / 100	▲7.95	▼0.03	50.36%
Bishan–Toa Payoh GRC	4	90,020	2,092	Singapore People's Party	Steve Chia; Melvyn Chiu; Lim Rui Xian; Muhammad Norhakim	21,944	24.82 / 100	▼7.95	▲0.03	50.36%
Bukit Gombak SMC	1	23,806	298	People's Action Party	Low Yen Ling	17,946	75.81 / 100	—N/a	▼0.02	51.62%
Bukit Gombak SMC	1	23,806	298	Progress Singapore Party	Harish Pillay	5,726	24.19 / 100	—N/a	▲0.02	51.62%
Bukit Panjang SMC	1	31,481	350	People's Action Party	Liang Eng Hwa	19,152	61.38 / 100	▲7.65	▼0.03	22.82%
Bukit Panjang SMC	1	31,481	350	Singapore Democratic Party	Paul Tambyah	12,051	38.62 / 100	▼7.65	▲0.03	22.82%
Chua Chu Kang GRC	4	87,677	1,191	People's Action Party	Tan See Leng; Choo Pei Ling; Jeffrey Siow; Zhulkarnain Abdul Rahim	55,140	63.60 / 100	▲4.96	▲0.01	27.2%
Chua Chu Kang GRC	4	87,677	1,191	Progress Singapore Party	A'bas Kasmani; Wendy Low; Lawrence Pek; S Nallakaruppan	31,562	36.40 / 100	▼4.96	▼0.01	27.2%
East Coast GRC	5	137,141	1,570	People's Action Party	Edwin Tong; Dinesh Vasu Dash; Hazlina Abdul Halim; Tan Kiat How; Jessica Tan	80,105	58.73 / 100	▲5.34	▼0.03	17.46%
East Coast GRC	5	137,141	1,570	Workers' Party	Nathaniel Koh; Jasper Kuan; Paris V Parameswari; Sufyan Mikhail Putra; Yee Jenn Jong	56,288	41.27 / 100	▼5.34	▲0.03	17.46%
Holland–Bukit Timah GRC	4	111,632	2,694	People's Action Party	Vivian Balakrishnan; Edward Chia; Christopher de Souza; Sim Ann	86,936	79.25 / 100	▲12.89	▲0.04	58.50%
Holland–Bukit Timah GRC	4	111,632	2,694	Red Dot United	Fazli Talip; Nizar Subair; Sharad Kumar; Emily Woo	22,762	20.75 / 100	—N/a	▼0.04	58.50%
Hougang SMC	1	27,481	296	Workers' Party	Dennis Tan	16,900	62.17 / 100	▲0.94	▲0.02	24.34%
Hougang SMC	1	27,481	296	People's Action Party	Marshall Lim	10,285	37.83 / 100	▼0.94	▼0.02	24.34%
Jalan Besar GRC	4	96,862	3,349	People's Action Party	Josephine Teo; Shawn Loh; Denise Phua; Wan Rizal	70,602	75.21 / 100	▲9.85	Steady	50.42%
Jalan Besar GRC	4	96,862	3,349	People's Alliance for Reform	Chiu Shin Kong; Mohamad Hamim Aliyas; Sarina Abu Hassan; Vigneswari V Ramachandran	23,267	24.79 / 100	—N/a	Steady	50.42%
Jalan Kayu SMC	1	27,796	377	People's Action Party	Ng Chee Meng	14,146	51.47 / 100	—N/a	Steady	2.94%
Jalan Kayu SMC	1	27,796	377	Workers' Party	Andre Low (Note: Elected as NCMP)	13,337	48.53 / 100	—N/a	Steady	2.94%
Jurong Central SMC	1	27,713	531	People's Action Party	Xie Yao Quan	21,947	80.51 / 100	—N/a	Steady	61.02%
Jurong Central SMC	1	27,713	531	Red Dot United	Kala Manickam	5,313	19.49 / 100	—N/a	Steady	61.02%
Jurong East–Bukit Batok GRC	5	132,786	3,198	People's Action Party	Grace Fu; David Hoe; Lee Hong Chuang; Murali Pillai; Rahayu Mahzam	99,692	76.67 / 100	—N/a	▲0.01	53.34%
Jurong East–Bukit Batok GRC	5	132,786	3,198	Red Dot United	Harish Mohanadas; Liyana Dhamirah; Marcus Neo; Osman Sulaiman; Ben Puah	30,342	23.33 / 100	—N/a	▼0.01	53.34%
Kebun Baru SMC	1	20,356	325	People's Action Party	Henry Kwek	13,787	68.49 / 100	▲5.57	▲0.01	36.98%
Kebun Baru SMC	1	20,356	325	Progress Singapore Party	Tony Tan	6,342	31.51 / 100	▼5.57	▼0.01	36.98%
Marine Parade–Braddell Heights GRC	5	Uncontested		People's Action Party	Seah Kian Peng; Goh Pei Ming; Muhammad Faishal Ibrahim; Diana Pang; Tin Pei Ling	Uncontested				
Marsiling–Yew Tee GRC	4	119,559	1,668	People's Action Party	Lawrence Wong; Hany Soh; Alex Yam; Zaqy Mohamad	81,143	73.48 / 100	▲10.30	▼0.02	46.96%
Marsiling–Yew Tee GRC	4	119,559	1,668	Singapore Democratic Party	Ariffin Sha; Jufri Salim; Alec Tok; Gigene Wong	29,281	26.52 / 100	▼10.30	▲0.02	46.96%
Marymount SMC	1	21,282	251	People's Action Party	Gan Siow Huang	14,954	70.73 / 100	▲15.69	▲0.03	41.46%
Marymount SMC	1	21,282	251	Progress Singapore Party	Jeffrey Khoo	6,187	29.27 / 100	▼15.69	▼0.03	41.46%
Mountbatten SMC	1	20,063	474	People's Action Party	Gho Sze Kee	12,602	63.82 / 100	▼9.96	▼0.02	27.64%
Mountbatten SMC	1	20,063	474	Independent	Jeremy Tan	7,143	36.18 / 100	—N/a	▲0.02	27.64%
Nee Soon GRC	5	142,286	3,090	People's Action Party	K. Shanmugam; Jackson Lam; Goh Hanyan; Lee Hui Ying; Syed Harun Alhabsyi	102,974	73.81 / 100	▲11.91	Steady	47.62%
Nee Soon GRC	5	142,286	3,090	Red Dot United	David Foo; Sharon Lin; Pang Heng Chuan; Ravi Philemon; Syed Alwi Ahmad	36,538	26.19 / 100	—N/a	Steady	47.62%
Pasir Ris–Changi GRC	4	92,479	2,491	People's Action Party	Indranee Rajah; Valerie Lee; Sharael Taha; Desmond Tan	61,168	67.68 / 100	—N/a	▲0.02	35.36%
Pasir Ris–Changi GRC	4	92,479	2,491	Singapore Democratic Alliance	Abu Mohamed; Chia Yun Kai; Harminder Pal Singh; Desmond Lim	29,213	32.32 / 100	—N/a	▼0.02	35.36%
Pioneer SMC	1	23,656	233	People's Action Party	Patrick Tay	15,360	65.45 / 100	▲3.47	▲0.03	30.90%
Pioneer SMC	1	23,656	233	Progress Singapore Party	Stephanie Tan	8,110	34.55 / 100	▼0.66	▼0.03	30.90%
Potong Pasir SMC	1	28,275	544	People's Action Party	Alex Yeo	19,288	69.21 / 100	▲8.53	▼0.01	46.74%
Potong Pasir SMC	1	28,275	544	Singapore People's Party	Williiamson Lee	6,261	22.46 / 100	▼16.85	▼0.01	46.74%
Potong Pasir SMC	1	28,275	544	People's Alliance for Reform (lost $13,500 deposit)	Lim Tean	2,323	8.33 / 100	—N/a	▲0.02	46.74%
Punggol GRC	4	116,074	823	People's Action Party	Gan Kim Yong; Janil Puthucheary; Sun Xueling; Yeo Wan Ling	63,745	55.17 / 100	—N/a	Steady	10.34%
Punggol GRC	4	116,074	823	Workers' Party	Jackson Au; Alexis Dang; Harpreet Singh Nehal; Siti Alia Mattar	51,789	44.83 / 100	—N/a	Steady	10.34%
Queenstown SMC	1	26,468	705	People's Action Party	Eric Chua	20,990	81.13 / 100	—N/a	▲0.01	62.26%
Queenstown SMC	1	26,468	705	People's Alliance for Reform	Mahaboob Batcha	4,883	18.87 / 100	—N/a	▼0.01	62.26%
Radin Mas SMC	1	23,289	446	People's Action Party	Melvin Yong	15,854	69.12 / 100	▼4.79	▼0.05	45.63%
Radin Mas SMC	1	23,289	446	Independent	Darryl Lo	5,394	23.52 / 100	—N/a	▲0.05	45.63%
Radin Mas SMC	1	23,289	446	People's Alliance for Reform (lost $13,500 deposit)	Kumar Appavoo	1,689	7.36 / 100	▼18.63	Steady	45.63%
Sembawang GRC	5	125,746	1,848	People's Action Party	Ong Ye Kung; Gabriel Lam; Mariam Jaafar; Ng Shi Xuan; Vikram Nair	84,159	67.76 / 100	▲0.47	▲0.01	37.84%
Sembawang GRC	5	125,746	1,848	Singapore Democratic Party	Damanhuri Abas; James Gomez; Bryan Lim Boon Heng; Surayah Akbar; Alfred Tan	37,157	29.92 / 100	—N/a	▼0.01	37.84%
Sembawang GRC	5	125,746	1,848	National Solidarity Party (lost $67,500 deposit)	Raiyian Chia; Lee Wei; Spencer Ng; Verina Ong; Yadzeth Hairis	2,878	2.32 / 100	▼30.39	Steady	37.84%
Sembawang West SMC	1	22,788	269	People's Action Party	Poh Li San	11,999	53.18 / 100	—N/a	▼0.01	6.36%
Sembawang West SMC	1	22,788	269	Singapore Democratic Party	Chee Soon Juan	10,564	46.82 / 100	—N/a	▲0.01	6.36%
Sengkang GRC	4	118,815	927	Workers' Party	He Ting Ru; Louis Chua; Jamus Lim; Abdul Muhaimin	66,383	56.31 / 100	▲4.20	▲0.01	12.62%
Sengkang GRC	4	118,815	927	People's Action Party	Lam Pin Min; Elmie Nekmat; Bernadette Giam; Theodora Lai	51,505	43.69 / 100	▼4.20	▼0.01	12.62%
Tampines GRC	5	138,570	1,262	People's Action Party	Masagos Zulkifli; Baey Yam Keng; Charlene Chen; Koh Poh Koon; David Neo	71,589	52.02 / 100	▼14.39	Steady	4.65%
Tampines GRC	5	138,570	1,262	Workers' Party	Faisal Manap; Eileen Chong; Ong Lue Ping; Tan Khim Teck; Michael Thng	65,197	47.37 / 100	—N/a	Steady	4.65%
Tampines GRC	5	138,570	1,262	People's Power Party (lost $67,500 deposit)	Arbaah Haroun; Goh Meng Seng; Derrick Sim; Peter Soh; Vere Nathan	596	0.43 / 100	—N/a	Steady	4.65%
Tampines GRC	5	138,570	1,262	National Solidarity Party (lost $67,500 deposit)	Reno Fong; Ridzwan Mohammad; Zee Phay; Thamilselvan Karuppaya; Yeo Ren-yuan	249	0.18 / 100	▼33.41	Steady	4.65%
Tampines Changkat SMC	1	22,372	224	People's Action Party	Desmond Choo	12,476	56.16 / 100	—N/a	▼0.01	12.32%
Tampines Changkat SMC	1	22,372	224	Workers' Party	Kenneth Foo	9,741	43.84 / 100	—N/a	▲0.01	12.32%
Tanjong Pagar GRC	5	124,774	3,681	People's Action Party	Chan Chun Sing; Foo Cexiang; Joan Pereira; Rachel Ong; Alvin Tan	98,924	81.02 / 100	▲17.90	▼0.01	62.06%
Tanjong Pagar GRC	5	124,774	3,681	People's Alliance for Reform	Rickson Giauw; Han Hui Hui; Nadarajan Selvamani; Prabu Ramachandran; Soh Lian Chye	23,169	18.98 / 100	—N/a	▲0.01	62.06%
West Coast–Jurong West GRC	5	148,647	1,438	People's Action Party	Desmond Lee; Ang Wei Neng; Hamid Razak; Shawn Huang; Cassandra Lee	88,587	59.99 / 100	—N/a	▼0.02	19.98%
West Coast–Jurong West GRC	5	148,647	1,438	Progress Singapore Party	Tan Cheng Bock; Leong Mun Wai; Hazel Poa; Sani Ismail; Sumarleki Amjah	59,078	40.01 / 100	—N/a	▲0.02	19.98%
Yio Chu Kang SMC	1	23,400	559	People's Action Party	Yip Hon Weng	18,066	78.75 / 100	▲17.92	▲0.02	57.50%
Yio Chu Kang SMC	1	23,400	559	People's Alliance for Reform	Michael Fang	4,876	21.25 / 100	—N/a	▼0.02	57.50%

=== By Community Development Council ===
With regards to the CDC, the Central CDC continued to show a strong performance by the PAP winning with bigger margins such as the top performers of Queenstown SMC and Tanjong Pagar GRC, followed by the North West CDC, largely attributed to the Prime Minister Lawrence Wong's held seat of Marsiling-Yew Tee GRC and no WP candidates fielding in that CDC (the other being South West). While the Western regions also continued to have good showings by PAP, performances by other parties polled with no more than one-third of the contested vote shares; the weakest performers of the South West and North West CDC are West Coast-Jurong West GRC and Sembawang West SMC, respectively, as because PSP and SDP have mounted fierce challenges despite nearly capturing them in both constituencies. Together, the Central and Western regions comprise 62 out of the 92 contested seats, or 67%. Nonetheless, the PAP improved their vote share of 65.57% compared to its last election to continue maintain their 60% baseline island-wide, which the PAP had achieved this consistency since post-independence.

The remaining 30 contested seats are from the eastern regions. Owing to the redistricting of two WP-held wards of Aljunied GRC and Hougang SMC from North East CDC to the South East CDC, with the sole walkover constituency Marine Parade-Braddell Heights GRC being part of the latter CDC, it marked the first time since the unified creation of the CDC regions scheme in 2001 where the PAP won the contested vote share by a plurality, scoring with just 49.52% versus WP's 48.23%. In contrast, 25 seats were contested by the WP; both CDCs also had PAP vote shares falling below the national average. Even if the Jalan Kayu SMC, the only WP-contested constituency that was outside of both aforementioned CDCs, was taken out of consideration, WP would still win their combined popular vote in the seven constituencies contested by them to the PAP.

==== Votes polled ====
District			
District	PAP	WP	Others
Central	75.78%	2.16%	22.06%
Northeast	53.84%	39.95%	6.21%
Northwest	71.86%		28.14%
Southeast	49.52%	48.23%	2.25%
Southwest	68.07%		31.93%
TOTAL	65.57%	14.99%	19.44%

==== Seats won ====
District	Seats			
District	Seats	PAP	WP	Others
Central	25	25	0	0
Northeast	18	14	4	0
Northwest	20	20		0
Southeast	17	11	6	0
Southwest	17	17		0
TOTAL	97	87	10	0

=== Analysis ===
- Constituencies with no comparison to 2020 were due to them being new constituencies; only the following constituencies may be compared with 2020 results as they existed in both elections, although most had changes in their electoral boundaries.
- While Jurong East–Bukit Batok and West Coast–Jurong West GRCs were respectively renamed from Jurong GRC and West Coast GRC, any swings for the 2020 election are not reflected in the list as they are considered new constituencies. The PAP would otherwise receive swings of +2.04% and +8.33% respectively.
- As the People's Alliance for Reform was formed as a merger of Peoples Voice and the Reform Party, which had contested the last election separately, any results from the last election that either parties previously contested in the same constituency are not reflected in the list per consistency reasons, unless otherwise stated.
- Percentages may not add up to 100% due to rounding.
- Vote counts below are for votes cast in Singapore only and exclude votes cast overseas.

==== Top 10 performing constituencies for the PAP ====
#	Constituency	PAP			Opposition			
#	Constituency	Votes	%	Swing	Party	Votes	%	Swing
1	Queenstown SMC	20,900	81.12%	New	People's Alliance for Reform	4,864	18.88%	New
2	Tanjong Pagar GRC	98,152	81.03%	▲17.90%	People's Alliance for Reform	22,971	18.97%	New
3	Jurong Central SMC	21,884	80.51%	New	Red Dot United	5,298	19.59%	New
4	Holland–Bukit Timah GRC	86,384	79.29%	▲12.93%	Red Dot United	22,561	20.71%	New
5	Ang Mo Kio GRC	115,562	78.95%	▲7.04%	Singapore United Party	15,874	10.85%	New
5	Ang Mo Kio GRC	115,562	78.95%	▲7.04%	People's Power Party	14,929	10.20%	New
6	Yio Chu Kang SMC	17,992	78.73%	▲17.90%	People's Alliance for Reform	4,860	21.27%	New
7	Jurong East–Bukit Batok GRC	99,345	76.66%	New	Red Dot United	30,248	23.34%	New
8	Bukit Gombak SMC	17,826	75.83%	New	Progress Singapore Party	5,682	24.17%	New
9	Bishan–Toa Payoh GRC	66,137	75.21%	▲7.98%	Singapore People's Party	21,799	24.79%	▼7.98%
9	Jalan Besar GRC	70,345	75.21%	▲9.85%	People's Alliance for Reform	23,186	24.79%	▼9.85%
10	Nee Soon GRC	102,744	73.81%	▲11.91%	Red Dot United	36,459	26.19%	New

==== Top 10 best opposition performers ====
#	Constituency	Opposition				PAP		
#	Constituency	Votes	%	Swing	Party	Votes	%	Swing
1	Hougang SMC	16,900	62.17%	▲0.96%	Workers' Party	10,285	37.83%	▼0.96%
2	Aljunied GRC	78,847	59.68%	▼0.27%	Workers' Party	53,263	40.32%	▲0.27%
3	Sengkang GRC	66,383	56.31%	▲4.19%	Workers' Party	51,505	43.69%	▼4.19%
4	Jalan Kayu SMC	13,307	48.53%	New	Workers' Party	14,113	51.47%	New
5	Tampines GRC (Note: Tampines GRC experienced a four-way contest. The opposition would still place fifth in this table if it had been a single party; it received 65,886 votes (47.98%) to the PAP's 71,423 (52.02%).)	65,197	47.37%	New	Workers' Party	71,589	52.02%	▼14.39%
6	Sembawang West SMC	10,541	46.81%	New	Singapore Democratic Party	11,978	53.19%	New
7	Punggol GRC	51,663	44.83%	New	Workers' Party	63,589	55.17%	New
8	Tampines Changkat SMC	9,741	43.84%	New	Workers' Party	12,476	56.16%	New
9	East Coast GRC	55,912	41.24%	▼5.37%	Workers' Party	79,664	58.76%	▲5.37%
10	West Coast–Jurong West GRC	58,863	39.99%	New	Progress Singapore Party	88,347	60.01%	New

==== Top PAP swings ====
#	Constituency	2020%	2025%	Swing
1	Tanjong Pagar GRC	63.10%	81.03%	▲17.97%
2	Yio Chu Kang SMC	60.82%	78.73%	▲17.91%
3	Marymount SMC	55.04%	70.70%	▲15.66%
4	Tampines GRC	66.41%	52.02%	▼14.39%
5	Holland–Bukit Timah GRC	66.36%	79.29%	▲12.93%
5	Nee Soon GRC	61.90%	73.81%	▲11.89%
6	Marsiling–Yew Tee GRC	63.18%	73.46%	▲10.28%
7	Mountbatten SMC	73.82%	63.84%	▼9.98%
8	Jalan Besar GRC	65.36%	75.21%	▲9.85%
9	Potong Pasir SMC	60.67%	69.18%	▲8.51%
10	Bishan–Toa Payoh GRC	67.23%	75.21%	▲7.98%

==== Top opposition swings ====
#	Party	Constituency	2020%	2025%	Swing
1	National Solidarity Party	Tampines GRC	33.59%	0.18%	▼33.41%
2	National Solidarity Party	Sembawang GRC	32.71%	2.32%	▼30.39%
3	People's Alliance for Reform	Radin Mas SMC	25.99%	7.36%	▼18.63%
4	Singapore People's Party	Potong Pasir SMC	39.33%	22.47%	▼16.86%
5	Progress Singapore Party	Marymount SMC	44.96%	29.30%	▼15.66%
6	Singapore Democratic Party	Marsiling–Yew Tee GRC	36.82%	26.54%	▼10.28%
7	Singapore People's Party	Bishan–Toa Payoh GRC	32.77%	24.79%	▼7.98%
8	Singapore Democratic Party	Bukit Panjang SMC	46.27%	38.59%	▼7.68%
9	Progress Singapore Party	Kebun Baru SMC	37.08%	31.50%	▼5.58%
10	Workers' Party	East Coast GRC	46.61%	41.24%	▼5.37%

==== Sample count accuracies ====
#	Constituency	PAP			Opposition			
#	Constituency	Actual %	Sample %	Accuracy	Party	Actual %	Sample %	Accuracy
1	Tanjong Pagar GRC	81.03%	81%	▲0.03%	People's Alliance for Reform	18.97%	19%	▼0.03%
2	Ang Mo Kio GRC	78.95%	79%	▼0.05%	People's Power Party	10.21%	10%	▲0.21%
2	Ang Mo Kio GRC	78.95%	79%	▼0.05%	Singapore United Party	10.84%	11%	▼0.16%
3	Radin Mas SMC	69.17%	69%	▲0.17%	Independent candidate	23.47%	24%	▼0.53%
3	Radin Mas SMC	69.17%	69%	▲0.17%	People's Alliance for Reform	7.36%	7%	▲0.36%
4	Sembawang West SMC	53.19%	53%	▲0.19%	Singapore Democratic Party	46.81%	47%	▼0.19%
4	Nee Soon GRC	73.81%	74%	▼0.19%	Red Dot United	26.19%	26%	▲0.19%
5	Bishan–Toa Payoh GRC	75.21%	75%	▲0.21%	Singapore People's Party	24.79%	25%	▼0.21%
5	Jalan Besar GRC	75.21%	75%	▲0.21%	Red Dot United	24.79%	25%	▼0.21%
6	East Coast GRC	58.76%	59%	▼0.24%	Workers' Party	41.24%	41%	▲0.24%
7	Marymount SMC	70.70%	71%	▼0.30%	Progress Singapore Party	29.30%	29%	▲0.30%
8	Sengkang GRC	43.69%	44%	▼0.31%	Workers' Party	56.31%	56%	▲0.31%
9	Jurong Central SMC	80.51%	81%	▼0.49%	Red Dot United	19.49%	19%	▲0.49%
10	Jalan Kayu SMC	51.47%	52%	▼0.53%	Workers' Party	48.53%	48%	▲0.53%
11	Marsiling–Yew Tee GRC	73.46%	74%	▼0.54%	Singapore Democratic Party	26.54%	26%	▲0.54%
12	Pioneer SMC	65.42%	66%	▼0.58%	Progress Singapore Party	34.58%	34%	▲0.58%
13	Bukit Panjang SMC	61.41%	62%	▼0.59%	Singapore Democratic Party	38.59%	38%	▲0.59%
13	Chua Chu Kang GRC	63.59%	63%	▲0.59%	Progress Singapore Party	36.41%	37%	▼0.59%
14	Jurong East–Bukit Batok GRC	76.66%	76%	▲0.66%	Red Dot United	23.34%	24%	▼0.59%
14	Pasir Ris–Changi GRC	67.66%	67%	▲0.66%	Singapore Democratic Alliance	33.34%	33%	▼0.66%
15	Aljunied GRC	40.32%	41%	▼0.68%	Workers' Party	59.68%	59%	▲0.68%
16	Holland–Bukit Timah GRC	79.29%	80%	▼0.71%	Red Dot United	20.71%	20%	▲0.71%
17	Sembawang GRC	67.75%	67%	▲0.75%	National Solidarity Party	2.32%	2%	▲0.32%
17	Sembawang GRC	67.75%	67%	▲0.75%	Singapore Democratic Party	29.93%	31%	▼1.07%
18	Bukit Gombak SMC	75.83%	75%	▼0.83%	Progress Singapore Party	24.17%	25%	▼0.83%
18	Hougang SMC	37.83%	37%	▲0.83%	Workers' Party	62.17%	63%	▼0.83%
19	Queenstown SMC	81.12%	82%	▼0.88%	People's Alliance for Reform	18.82%	18%	▲0.88%
20	Tampines GRC	52.02%	53%	▼0.98%	National Solidarity Party	0.18%	0%	▲0.18%
20	Tampines GRC	52.02%	53%	▼0.98%	People's Power Party	0.43%	1%	▼0.57%
20	Tampines GRC	52.02%	53%	▼0.98%	Workers' Party	47.37%	46%	▲1.37%
21	West Coast–Jurong West GRC	60.01%	61%	▼0.99%	Progress Singapore Party	39.99%	39%	▲0.99%
22	Punggol GRC	55.17%	54%	▲1.17%	Workers' Party	44.83%	46%	▼1.17%
22	Tampines Changkat SMC	56.17%	55%	▲1.17%	Workers' Party	43.83%	45%	▼1.17%
23	Potong Pasir SMC	69.18%	71%	▼1.82%	People's Alliance for Reform	8.35%	8%	▲0.35%
23	Potong Pasir SMC	69.18%	71%	▼1.82%	Singapore People's Party	22.47%	21%	▲1.47%
24	Mountbatten SMC	63.84%	62%	▲1.84%	Independent candidate	36.16%	38%	▼1.84%
25	Kebun Baru SMC	68.50%	66%	▲2.50%	Progress Singapore Party	31.50%	34%	▼2.50%
26	Yio Chu Kang SMC	78.73%	76%	▲2.73%	People's Alliance for Reform	22.17%	24%	▼2.73%

== Commentary ==
The PAP retained its supermajority, winning 87 out of 97 seats and improving its popular vote share by 4.34 percentage points to 65.57%, reversing its decline from the 2020 election. The Workers' Party (WP) held all 10 of its seats, increased its majority in Sengkang GRC and Hougang SMC, and qualified for two seats reserved for non-constituency Members of Parliament (NCMPs). Although the WP's contested vote share dipped slightly by 0.45%, its overall popular vote rose to 14.99%, and it won the contested popular vote for a second consecutive general election, at 50.04%.

Other opposition parties underperformed. The Progress Singapore Party (PSP), which held two NCMP seats after 2020, failed to enter Parliament and became extra-parliamentary. No opposition parties outside the WP crossed the 5% national vote share threshold, and while neither of the two independents won a seat, both retained their deposits; Jeremy Tan's 36.16% in Mountbatten was the strongest performance by an independent candidate since 1972.

A total of 27 candidates forfeited their $13,500 election deposits, surpassing the previous record (22) set in 1972. Several opposition parties, including the National Solidarity Party (NSP), People's Power Party (PPP), and Singapore United Party (SUP), saw all their candidates lose their deposits, including two opposing teams in both Ang Mo Kio GRC and Tampines GRC; in Ang Mo Kio, it also marked the first time since 1980 where every opponent in multi-cornered contests had forfeited their deposits; (Note: The last time where every opposing candidates had their deposits forfeited in a multi-cornered contest was 1980, in the case, Kebun Baru and Tanjong Pagar both saw both opponents losing their deposits.) in Tampines, two of the three opposing teams, the PPP's 0.43% and NSP's 0.18%, had marked the lowest vote share by any opposition party or independent candidate in post-independence Singapore, and the record-low in any elections since 1955, both surpassing Chua Kim Watt's score of 0.55%. (Note: The previous record for the lowest scoring score in post-independence Singapore was 0.57%, which was set by Singapore Democratic Alliance candidate Desmond Lim during the 2013 Punggol East by-election.) Furthermore, the NSP garnering only 1.19% of valid votes in the constituencies it contested which was also record-low for any election in post-independence Singapore.

=== Results and opposition parties ===
Many analysts commented on PAP's landslide victory, noting a "flight to safety", as voters had echoed Prime Minister Lawrence Wong's call for a "strong mandate". It was also pointed out that this had effectively bucked the trend of PAP's vote share dropping during a leadership transition. Analysts said that the results pointed to a two-party system as the way forward for Singapore's future. Commentators were split as to whether the WP's results were a good showing or a sign of minimal progress. While the party had increased its vote share in two out of three constituencies it defended and achieved 44% or more of votes in all new constituencies it contested, former PAP MP Inderjit Singh argued that its candidates were still too thinly spread-out, preventing it from securing another GRC. The WP itself tried to limit its candidacies by not contesting Marine Parade–Braddell Heights GRC, having contested the predecessor Marine Parade GRC.

Institute of Policy Studies (IPS) fellow Gillian Koh mentioned that the leadership transition "[was] indeed now complete" following the success of the election, and th the election was an endorsement of Wong's call for voters to return his experienced ministers to power as well as party renewal with the inclusion of new members. While critical of PAP arguments during the election campaign, she looked forward to the Singapore Economic Resilience Taskforce. (Note: The members for the Singapore Economic Resilience Taskforce are Chee Hong Tat, Gan Kim Yong, Desmond Lee, Tan See Leng and Josephine Teo. For the purpose of the election, Gan and Lee's wards (of Punggol GRC and West Coast-Jurong West GRC respectively) are considered as battleground states, while Chee, Tan and Teo's wards (of Bishan-Toa Payoh GRC, Chua Chu Kang GRC and Jalan Besar GRC respectively) are considered as safe seats; however, all five of the aforementioned ministers were re-elected in Parliament.) NUS Associate Professor Reuben Wong described the leadership renewal as a "continued viability" to be the most trade-dependent economy in the world. Analysts said that the Defence and Finance portfolios would need to be critically monitored, in addition to the fresh MPs that would be given office portfolios in the upcoming cabinet reshuffle. In a CNA podcast on 9 May, Hong Kong Baptist University's professor Kenneth Paul Tan suggested that the PAP's win was because "politicians spoke more freely and voters began listening differently", commenting that podcasts had become more mainstream in political engagement, as compared to the use of digital content in the 2020 election.

Many noted the "serious loss" faced by other opposition parties. In particular, the PSP lost the two NCMP seats it held in Parliament and experienced a decreased vote share despite it being party founder Tan Cheng Bock's last election, causing concern that the party could soon fade into obscurity. Political analyst Loke Hoe Yeong suggested that the presence of Poa and Leong as NCMPs did not gain the traction the party had desired at the polls, questioning if the West Coast–Jurong West GRC voters, specifically those of Ayer Rajah, had moved on from Tan's portrayal as a "larger-than-life persona" in the previous election, and whether the PSP had done enough to prepare for the post-Tan era. Associate Professor Chong Ja Ian suggested that the downward trend of internet usage and greater use of physical rallies may have attributed to the party's regress, while Eugene Tan suggested that the party was still new. Analysts said that PSP would have to keep their profile "relevant" in the next election as the PSP had been struggling with finding younger talents, with their decision to field fewer candidates (13) compared to the last election (24) contributing to their decisive defeat.

Observers suggested that the change of the electoral boundaries could have posed a challenge for the consolidation of resources as parties had to work in a large enough area to be less affected by boundary changes; observers also suggested that opposition parties may consider mergers and forming coalitions or risk dissolving their parties if negotiations are unsuccessful. Teo Kay Key also noted that Singaporeans want a "loyal opposition that does not oppose for the sake of opposing", and that the opposition had to have a "hard look" at their value proposition to the electorate and if demand allows. Post-election surveys have consistently shown desire among voters for greater political diversity, which suggest that opposition parties can no longer depend on reckoning antipathy towards the PAP; the election results were therefore seen as a vote for the kind of opposition politics Singaporeans want to perpetuate, as well as against the kind they want to do without, a necessary step towards a two-party or multi-party democracy.

Tan also described the smaller opposition parties such as PSP as "wipeout" as these parties are "staring at the abyss of political irrelevance", putting these parties at disadvantage unless they reassess their roles carefully by offering a value proposition to voters in a more crowded and fragmented opposition space. NUS lecturer Rebecca Grace Tan noted that the non-WP opposition parties would face "significant challenges for their future", and their candidates must promote change that is distinct from other parties in terms of positive policy stances aligned with voter preferences to sustain its party relevance. Political consultant Malminderjit Singh suggest that parties with good planning and consolidating resources would be more successful, and other parties like PSP, RDU, and SDP would need to expand further and "broaden their appeal and recruit from all races and backgrounds".

Teo Kay Key commented that candidates from Generations Z and Millennials, most notably independent ones, had outperformed compared to those from the older generation, due to their high use of social media and online content resources, calling it a "new normal in political engagement". There were 38 new candidates under the age of 40, with those from better-resourced political parties having a profile involving prior engagements in political, community or grassroots work. The proportion of younger voters were higher than in 2020, with statistics showing that these young voters preferred checks and balances and pluralism in government; Teo described these voters as "digital natives" due to the high usage of internet content. Young voters also improves democratic potential and strength, although that voters in the battleground states have different voting patterns and their point of views, suggesting that there are more nuanced contest between different political parties. Similarly, Eugene Tan suggested the same about PSP's loss due to the young voters had little familiarity towards them and their heartland voters was not properly recognized except for the use of social media; he however told that it was a "blessing in disguise" and even if WP has pulled away from the other opposition parties, these parties should not be forgotten. Singapore University of Social Sciences researcher Walter Theseira also noted that PSP and SDP will face new challenges after the election as they have an ageing core leadership and no clear pathway for renewal; he told that either their party branch out on joining other parties unless their philosophies are much more strongly aligned with their current parties, as it is just a "little point" to the candidates joining a minor party instead of going it alone, and with little hope into recruiting high-quality candidates except for those having a particular distinct policy differentiation.

In another Straits Times analysis on 10 May, political observers questioned WP's strategies as "ambitious and conservative in equal parts" with "a paradoxical mix of bold manoeuvres and calculated restraint" that suggest why the party still unable to make in-roads. Nanyang Technology University's observer Walid Jumblatt Abdullah mentioned that fielding Harpreet Singh Nehal alongside Faisal Manap in Tampines GRC could make a difference, but the allocation of its most appealing candidates in other contested constituencies (such as East Coast GRC) and the controversial walkover in Marine Parade–Braddell Heights GRC had caused some swings from the past election, where fresh party buy-in was required at its most. NUS economist and former Nominated MP Ivan Png noted their party's performance was the most stable among opposition parties and premium command had peaked compared to SDP and PSP, which figures have seen a regress in recent elections. SMU Associate Professor Tan suggested the results as "voters signalled that a firm mandate for the PAP was not at all at odds with a more vibrant political system characterised by a credible and responsible opposition", but whether if WP could fulfill its midterm goal of winning one-third of seats in Parliament is "still be within the ballpark of realism for its current leaders". Institute of Policy Studies researcher Gillian Koh also respected WP's strategies as "comfortable with playing the long game" for connecting and promote growth with the electorate. Similarly, in response for a more discerning electorate, IPS Social Lab fellow Tan Ern Ser told that WP has consolidated its position and distinguished itself from the rest of the opposition parties, and analyst Loke Hoe Yeong further justified that WP gained more credibility due to the incumbency effect and on par on managing town councils or choosing candidates like PAP does. Similarly, Inderjit Singh understood about the maturity of democracy and the need of credible opposition, but he was caught on surprise on SDP and PSP's decline; Singh also suggested that either Gigene Wong's blurting out a racial slur may have further impact SDP's performance, or if the voters trusted PAP's arguments against voting out key ministers and members of the Singapore Economic Resilience Taskforce for opposition, or both. NTU analyst Alan Chong say the same about SDP's performance, and Chee's experience onto building a profile had improved his vote share; Chong mentioned that while PAP and WP had the approach of talent recruitment and grassroots involvement, other opposition parties without elected MPs should focus onto building a candidate's credibility and attract talent, meaning that they had to put candidates up for elections, even if it means losing some contests. Former SPP candidate Jose Raymond also justified that groundwork and retail politics are essential.

On 11 May, other analysts further suggested that the Corporate Governance of Town Councils and specific municipal issues (such as the closure of the Aljunied–Hougang Town Council trial and how these MPs had handled the trial), especially towards the SMCs, suggested the results for the existing constituency to retain as it was (including a +4% WP-swing in Sengkang GRC), with the assurance for voters to continue estate management and improvement, and weighing that municipal issues are considered more important than those of debating national policies that what other opposition does in the hustings. Similarly, Darryl Lo's result in Radin Mas SMC also caught observers some surprise, suggesting that Lo had more "ground knowledge" (and putting campaigns about policy ideas and estate-level suggestions) than his other opponent Kumar Appavoo, who had contested there for three elections since 2015, compared to another independent candidate Han Hui Hui, whose performance also in 2015 lost her election deposit similar to Appavoo in this election.
