= 14th Parliament of Singapore =

Parliament of Singapore from 2020 to 2025

- Majority parliament
- 24 August 2020 – 15 April 2025 (4 years, 7 months and 22 days)

House
- Seating arrangements of the House
- Speaker of Parliament: Tan Chuan-Jin 24 August 2020 – 17 July 2023; Jessica Tan (Acting) 17 July 2023 – 2 August 2023; Seah Kian Peng 2 August 2023 – 15 April 2025
- Prime Minister: Lee Hsien Loong 24 August 2020 – 15 May 2024; Lawrence Wong 15 May 2024 – 15 April 2025
- Leader of the Opposition: Pritam Singh 24 August 2020 – 15 April 2025

Session(s)

1st Session
- 24 August 2020 – 24 March 2023 (2 years and 7 months)

2nd Session
- 10 April 2023 – 15 April 2025 (2 years and 5 days)

Cabinet(s)

14th Cabinet
- Lee Hsien Loong; 27 July 2020 – 15 May 2024

15th Cabinet
- Lawrence Wong; 15 May 2024 – 15 April 2025

Parliamentarians
Elected	NCMP	Nominated
87 (Note: 93 MPs were elected in the 2020 Singaporean general election. There are six vacant seats at dissolution.)	2	7 (Note: Nine nominated members are nominated in each session, on 21 January 2021 for the first, and 24 July 2023 for the second. There are two vacant seats at dissolution as two nominated members resigned before their term ended.)
<13th	15th>

The 14th Parliament of Singapore was a meeting of the Parliament of Singapore. It opened on 24 August 2020 and dissolved on 15 April 2025. The membership was set by the 2020 general election, held on 10 July. The final sitting for the term was on 8 April 2025, to discuss on the consensus relating the tariffs imposed by President of the United States Donald Trump a week prior.

The 14th Parliament was controlled by the People's Action Party majority, led by Prime Minister Lee Hsien Loong and members of the cabinet, which assumed power on 25 July 2020; it was then later led by Prime Minister Lawrence Wong and its inaugural cabinet, who assumed power on 15 May 2024. The initial number of seats of parliament at the start of the term was 104, with 10 seats from the Workers' Party led by Pritam Singh, two Non-Constituency Member of Parliament seats from the Progress Singapore Party, and nine Nominated Members. This is also the first time where the position for the Leader of the Opposition was officialised.

Not counting Nominated members, The parliament had the most seats vacated in post-independence since the inaugural Parliament during the term, with six, including Speaker of Parliament Tan Chuan-Jin who vacated his seat citing extramaritial affair along with Cheng Li Hui, Senior Minister Tharman Shanmugaratnam who later contested the 2023 Singaporean presidential election and Transport Minister S. Iswaran, who became the first cabinet minister since Teh Cheang Wan in 1986 to be charged for corruption. At four years, seven months and 22 days, the 14th Parliament had the second longest term in Singapore history, only behind the 8th Parliament; it also had the most sittings in one term, at 162, surpassing the previous term's 135.

== Result of the 2020 Singapore general election ==
Party	Votes	%	+/–	Seats	+/–
People's Action Party	1,527,491	61.23	–8.63	83	0
Workers' Party	279,922	11.22	–1.26	10	+1
Progress Singapore Party	253,996	10.18	New	2	New
Singapore Democratic Party	111,054	4.45	+0.92	0	0
National Solidarity Party	93,653	3.75	+0.22	0	0
Peoples Voice	59,183	2.37	New	0	New
Reform Party	54,599	2.19	–0.44	0	0
Singapore People's Party	37,998	1.52	–0.65	0	0
Singapore Democratic Alliance	37,237	1.49	–0.57	0	0
Red Dot United	31,260	1.25	New	0	New
People's Power Party	7,489	0.30	–0.83	0	0
Independents	655	0.03	–0.09	0	0
Total	2,494,537	100.00	–	95	+3
Valid votes	2,494,537	98.20			
Invalid/blank votes	45,822	1.80			
Total votes	2,540,359	100.00			
Registered voters/turnout	2,651,435	95.81			
Source: Singapore Elections

The Progress Singapore Party, being the best performing opposition party was awarded two Non-Constituency Member of Parliament seats in accordance with the Constitution. Hazel Poa, and Leong Mun Wai were appointed as NCMPs.

== Officeholders ==
=== Speaker ===
- Speaker:
  - Tan Chuan-Jin (Marine Parade GRC, PAP), until 17 July 2023
  - Jessica Tan (East Coast GRC, PAP), acting: 17 July – 2 August 2023
  - Seah Kian Peng (Marine Parade GRC, PAP), from 2 August 2023
- Deputy Speaker:
  - Christopher de Souza (Holland–Bukit Timah GRC, PAP), from 31 August 2020
  - Jessica Tan (East Coast GRC, PAP), from 31 August 2020

=== Leaders ===
- Prime Minister:
  - Lee Hsien Loong (Ang Mo Kio GRC, PAP), until 15 May 2024
  - Lawrence Wong (Marsiling–Yew Tee GRC, PAP), from 15 May 2024
- Leader of the Opposition: Pritam Singh (Aljunied GRC, WP)

=== House Leaders ===
- Leader of the House: Indranee Rajah (Tanjong Pagar GRC, PAP)
- Deputy Leader of the House: Zaqy Mohamad (Marsiling–Yew Tee GRC, PAP)

=== Whips ===
- Government Party Whip: Janil Puthucheary (Pasir Ris–Punggol GRC, PAP)
- Deputy Government Party Whip: Sim Ann (Holland–Bukit Timah GRC, PAP)
- Opposition Party Whip: Pritam Singh (Aljunied GRC, WP)
- Deputy Opposition Party Whip: Sylvia Lim Swee Lian (Aljunied GRC, WP)

== Members ==
Constituency	Division	Member	Party
Aljunied GRC	Bedok Reservoir–Punggol	Gerald Giam	Workers' Party
Aljunied GRC	Eunos	Pritam Singh	Workers' Party
Aljunied GRC	Kaki Bukit	Faisal Manap	Workers' Party
Aljunied GRC	Paya Lebar	Sylvia Lim	Workers' Party
Aljunied GRC	Serangoon	Leon Perera (Note: Leon Perera resigned on 17 July 2023. The remaining MPs of Aljunied GRC acted as interim MPs for Serangoon division.)	Workers' Party
Ang Mo Kio GRC	Ang Mo Kio–Hougang	Darryl David	People's Action Party
Ang Mo Kio GRC	Cheng San–Seletar	Nadia Ahmad Samdin	People's Action Party
Ang Mo Kio GRC	Fernvale	Gan Thiam Poh	People's Action Party
Ang Mo Kio GRC	Jalan Kayu	Ng Ling Ling	People's Action Party
Ang Mo Kio GRC	Teck Ghee	Lee Hsien Loong	People's Action Party
Bishan–Toa Payoh GRC	Bishan East-Sin Ming	Chong Kee Hiong	People's Action Party
Bishan–Toa Payoh GRC	Toa Payoh Central	Ng Eng Hen	People's Action Party
Bishan–Toa Payoh GRC	Toa Payoh East-Novena	Saktiandi Supaat	People's Action Party
Bishan–Toa Payoh GRC	Toa Payoh West-Thomson	Chee Hong Tat	People's Action Party
Bukit Batok SMC		Murali Pillai	People's Action Party
Bukit Panjang SMC		Liang Eng Hwa	People's Action Party
Chua Chu Kang GRC	Brickland	Don Wee	People's Action Party
Chua Chu Kang GRC	Bukit Gombak	Low Yen Ling	People's Action Party
Chua Chu Kang GRC	Chua Chu Kang	Gan Kim Yong	People's Action Party
Chua Chu Kang GRC	Keat Hong	Zhulkarnain Abdul Rahim	People's Action Party
East Coast GRC	Bedok	Heng Swee Keat	People's Action Party
East Coast GRC	Changi–Simei	Jessica Tan	People's Action Party
East Coast GRC	Fengshan	Cheryl Chan	People's Action Party
East Coast GRC	Kampong Chai Chee	Tan Kiat How	People's Action Party
East Coast GRC	Siglap	Maliki Osman	People's Action Party
Holland–Bukit Timah GRC	Bukit Timah	Sim Ann	People's Action Party
Holland–Bukit Timah GRC	Cashew	Vivian Balakrishnan	People's Action Party
Holland–Bukit Timah GRC	Ulu Pandan	Christopher de Souza	People's Action Party
Holland–Bukit Timah GRC	Zhenghua	Edward Chia	People's Action Party
Hong Kah North SMC		Amy Khor	People's Action Party
Hougang SMC		Dennis Tan	Workers' Party
Jalan Besar GRC	Kampong Glam	Denise Phua	People's Action Party
Jalan Besar GRC	Kolam Ayer	Wan Rizal	People's Action Party
Jalan Besar GRC	Kreta Ayer–Kim Seng	Josephine Teo	People's Action Party
Jalan Besar GRC	Whampoa	Heng Chee How	People's Action Party
Jurong GRC	Bukit Batok East	Rahayu Mahzam	People's Action Party
Jurong GRC	Clementi	Tan Wu Meng	People's Action Party
Jurong GRC	Jurong Central	Xie Yao Quan	People's Action Party
Jurong GRC	Jurong Spring	Shawn Huang	People's Action Party
Jurong GRC	Taman Jurong	Tharman Shanmugaratnam (Note: Tharman Shanmugaratnam resigned on 7 July 2023, to run for President of Singapore. MP Shawn Huang of Jurong GRC's Jurong Spring division acted as interim MP for Taman Jurong division.)	People's Action Party
Kebun Baru SMC		Henry Kwek	People's Action Party
MacPherson SMC		Tin Pei Ling	People's Action Party
Marine Parade GRC	Braddell Heights	Seah Kian Peng	People's Action Party
Marine Parade GRC	Geylang Serai	Fahmi Aliman	People's Action Party
Marine Parade GRC	Joo Chiat	Edwin Tong	People's Action Party
Marine Parade GRC	Kembangan–Chai Chee	Tan Chuan-Jin (Note: Tan Chuan-Jin resigned on 17 July 2023. MP Edwin Tong of Marine Parade GRC's Joo Chiat division acted as interim MP for Kembangan–Chai Chee division.)	People's Action Party
Marine Parade GRC	Marine Parade	Tan See Leng	People's Action Party
Marsiling–Yew Tee GRC	Limbang	Lawrence Wong	People's Action Party
Marsiling–Yew Tee GRC	Marsiling	Zaqy Mohamad	People's Action Party
Marsiling–Yew Tee GRC	Woodgrove	Hany Soh	People's Action Party
Marsiling–Yew Tee GRC	Yew Tee	Alex Yam	People's Action Party
Marymount SMC		Gan Siow Huang	People's Action Party
Mountbatten SMC		Lim Biow Chuan	People's Action Party
Nee Soon GRC	Chong Pang	K. Shanmugam	People's Action Party
Nee Soon GRC	Nee Soon Central	Faishal Ibrahim	People's Action Party
Nee Soon GRC	Nee Soon East	Louis Ng	People's Action Party
Nee Soon GRC	Nee Soon Link	Derrick Goh	People's Action Party
Nee Soon GRC	Nee Soon South	Carrie Tan	People's Action Party
Pasir Ris–Punggol GRC	Pasir Ris Central	Desmond Tan	People's Action Party
Pasir Ris–Punggol GRC	Pasir Ris East	Sharael Taha	People's Action Party
Pasir Ris–Punggol GRC	Pasir Ris West	Teo Chee Hean	People's Action Party
Pasir Ris–Punggol GRC	Punggol Coast	Janil Puthucheary	People's Action Party
Pasir Ris–Punggol GRC	Punggol Shore	Yeo Wan Ling	People's Action Party
Pioneer SMC		Patrick Tay	People's Action Party
Potong Pasir SMC		Sitoh Yih Pin	People's Action Party
Punggol West SMC		Sun Xueling	People's Action Party
Radin Mas SMC		Melvin Yong	People's Action Party
Sembawang GRC	Admiralty	Vikram Nair	People's Action Party
Sembawang GRC	Canberra	Lim Wee Kiak	People's Action Party
Sembawang GRC	Sembawang Central	Ong Ye Kung	People's Action Party
Sembawang GRC	Sembawang West	Poh Li San	People's Action Party
Sembawang GRC	Woodlands	Mariam Jaafar	People's Action Party
Sengkang GRC	Buangkok	He Ting Ru	Workers' Party
Sengkang GRC	Anchorvale	Jamus Lim	Workers' Party
Sengkang GRC	Compassvale	Raeesah Khan (Note: Raeesah Khan resigned on 30 November 2021. The remaining MPs of Sengkang GRC acted as interim MPs for Compassvale division.)	Workers' Party
Sengkang GRC	Rivervale	Louis Chua	Workers' Party
Tampines GRC	Tampines Central	Koh Poh Koon	People's Action Party
Tampines GRC	Tampines Changkat	Desmond Choo	People's Action Party
Tampines GRC	Tampines East	Cheng Li Hui (Note: Cheng Li Hui resigned on 17 July 2023. MP of Masagos Zulkifli of Tampines GRC's Tampines West division acted as interim MP for Tampines East division.)	People's Action Party
Tampines GRC	Tampines North	Baey Yam Keng	People's Action Party
Tampines GRC	Tampines West	Masagos Zulkifli	People's Action Party
Tanjong Pagar GRC	Buona Vista	Chan Chun Sing	People's Action Party
Tanjong Pagar GRC	Henderson–Dawson	Joan Pereira	People's Action Party
Tanjong Pagar GRC	Moulmein–Cairnhill	Alvin Tan	People's Action Party
Tanjong Pagar GRC	Queenstown	Eric Chua	People's Action Party
Tanjong Pagar GRC	Tanjong Pagar–Tiong Bahru	Indranee Rajah	People's Action Party
West Coast GRC	Ayer Rajah–Gek Poh	Foo Mee Har	People's Action Party
West Coast GRC	Boon Lay	Desmond Lee	People's Action Party
West Coast GRC	Nanyang	Ang Wei Neng	People's Action Party
West Coast GRC	Telok Blangah	Rachel Ong	People's Action Party
West Coast GRC	West Coast	S. Iswaran (Note: S. Iswaran was suspended from 12 July 2023, and eventually resigned on 16 January 2024. MP Desmond Lee of West Coast GRC's Boon Lay division acted as interim MP for West Coast division.)	People's Action Party
Yio Chu Kang SMC		Yip Hon Weng	People's Action Party
Yuhua SMC		Grace Fu	People's Action Party
Non-constituency Member of Parliament		Leong Mun Wai	Progress Singapore Party
Non-constituency Member of Parliament		Hazel Poa	Progress Singapore Party
Nominated Member of Parliament		Janet Ang (Note: Served as Nominated Member of Parliament from 21 January 2021 until 23 July 2023.)	Independent
Nominated Member of Parliament		Mark Chay	Independent
Nominated Member of Parliament		Cheng Hsing Yao	Independent
Nominated Member of Parliament		Hoon Hian Teck	Independent
Nominated Member of Parliament		Koh Lian Pin	Independent
Nominated Member of Parliament		Abdul Samad Abdul Wahab	Independent
Nominated Member of Parliament		Shahira Abdullah	Independent
Nominated Member of Parliament		Tan Yia Swam	Independent
Nominated Member of Parliament		Usha Chandradas (Note: Served as Nominated Member of Parliament from 24 July 2023.)	Independent
Nominated Member of Parliament		Keith Chua	Independent
Nominated Member of Parliament		Mark Lee	Independent
Nominated Member of Parliament		Ong Hua Han	Independent
Nominated Member of Parliament		Neil Parekh	Independent
Nominated Member of Parliament		Razwana Begum	Independent
Nominated Member of Parliament		Jean See	Independent
Nominated Member of Parliament		Syed Harun Alhabsyi (Note: Syed Harun Alhabsyi took office Nominated Member of Parliament from 24 July 2023, but later resigned on 14 February 2025.)	Independent
Nominated Member of Parliament		Raj Joshua Thomas (Note: Raj Joshua Thomas took office on 21 January 2021, but later resigned on 14 February 2025.)	Independent

== Committees ==
=== Select committees ===
==== Committee of selection ====
The committee of selection selects and nominates members to the various sessional and select committees. The committee consists of seven other members:

- Indranee Rajah
- Koh Poh Koon
- Denise Phua
- Pritam Singh
- Tan See Leng
- Edwin Tong
- Zaqy Mohamad

==== Committee of privileges ====
The committee of privileges looks into any complaint alleging breaches of parliamentary privilege. The committee consists of seven other members:

- Grace Fu
- Indranee Rajah
- Desmond Lee
- Masagos Zulkifli
- K. Shanmugam
- Dennis Tan
- Don Wee

==== Estimates committee ====
The estimates committee examines the Government's budget and reports what economies, improvements in organisation, efficiency or administrative reforms consistent with the policy underlying the estimates, may be effected and suggests the form in which the estimates shall be presented to Parliament. The committee consists of eight members:

- Ang Wei Neng (chairperson)
- Lim Biow Chuan
- Jamus Lim
- Rachel Ong
- Sitoh Yih Pin
- Vikram Nair
- Yip Hon Weng
- Zhulkarnain Abdul Rahim

==== House committee ====
The house committee looks after the comfort and convenience of Members of Parliament and advises the Speaker on these matters. The committee consists of six other members:

- Eric Chua
- He Ting Ru
- Fahmi Aliman
- Ng Ling Ling
- Joan Pereira
- Yeo Wan Ling
- Nadia Ahmad Samdin

==== Public accounts committee ====
The public accounts committee examines various accounts of the Government showing the appropriation of funds granted by Parliament to meet public expenditure, as well as other accounts laid before Parliament. The committee consists of eight members:

- Foo Mee Har (chairperson)
- Cheryl Chan
- Louis Chua
- Derrick Goh
- Henry Kwek
- Poh Li San
- Saktiandi Supaat
- Tan Wu Meng

==== Public petitions committee ====
The public petitions committee deals with public petitions received by the House. Its function is to consider petitions referred to the committee and to report to the House. The committee consists of seven members:

- Chee Hong Tat
- Ong Ye Kung
- Rahayu Mahzam
- Hany Soh
- Edwin Tong
- Leong Mun Wai
- Murali Pillai SC

==== Standing orders committee ====
The standing orders committee reviews the Standing Orders from time to time and recommends amendments and reports to the House on all matters relating to them., the committee consists of the Deputy Speakers of Parliament and seven other members:

- Christopher de Souza (Deputy Speaker)
- Jessica Tan (Deputy Speaker)
- Gerald Giam
- Indranee Rajah
- Janil Puthucheary
- Sharael Taha
- Sim Ann
- Alvin Tan
- Melvin Yong

==== Special Select Committee on Nominations for Appointment as Nominated Members of Parliament ====
The special select committee is set up to nominate persons for appointment as Nominated Members of Parliament by the President. The committee consists of six other members:

- Chan Chun Sing
- Gan Kim Yong
- Gan Siow Huang
- Indranee Rajah
- Mohamad Maliki Bin Osman
- Vivian Balakrishnan

=== Government Parliamentary Committees ===
Mooted by then-Deputy Prime Minister Goh Chok Tong in 1987, government parliamentary committees (GPCs) are set up by the governing People's Action Party to scrutinise the legislation and programmes of the various Ministries. They also serve as an additional channel of feedback on government policies.

Current members of the Government Parliamentary Committees as of 15 April 2024
Government Parliamentary Committee	Member of Parliament
Communications and Information
Chairperson	Tin Pei Ling
Deputy Chairperson	Alex Yam
Members	Christopher de Souza; Seah Kian Peng; Jessica Tan; Hany Soh; Sharael Taha
Culture, Community and Youth
Chairperson	Sitoh Yih Pin
Deputy Chairperson	Darryl David
Members	Tin Pei Ling; Joan Pereira; Fahmi Aliman; Hany Soh; Xie Yao Quan
Defence and Foreign Affairs
Chairperson	Vikram Nair
Deputy Chairperson	Alex Yam
Members	Chong Kee Hiong; Henry Kwek; Don Wee; Rachel Ong; Zhulkarnain Abdul Rahim; Joan Pereira
Education
Chairperson	Patrick Tay
Deputy Chairperson	Darryl David
Members	Denise Phua; Foo Mee Har; Mariam Jaafar; Shawn Huang; Wan Rizal
Finance and Trade and Industry
Chairperson	Liang Eng Hwa
Deputy Chairperson	Foo Mee Har
Members	Jessica Tan; Saktiandi Supaat; Desmond Choo; Derrick Goh; Edward Chia; Shawn Huang; Mariam Jaafar
Health
Chairperson	Tan Wu Meng
Deputy Chairperson	Ng Ling Ling
Members	Lim Wee Kiak; Ang Wei Neng; Wan Rizal; Yip Hon Weng; Mariam Jaafar
Home Affairs and Law
Chairperson	Murali Pillai
Deputy Chairperson	Zhulkarnain Abdul Rahim
Members	Christopher de Souza; Sitoh Yih Pin; Tan Wu Meng; Vikram Nair; Patrick Tay; Derrick Goh
Manpower
Chairperson	Desmond Choo
Deputy Chairperson	Edward Chia
Members	Liang Eng Hwa; Sharael Taha; Rachel Ong; Yeo Wan Ling; Yip Hon Weng
National Development
Chairperson	Cheryl Chan
Deputy Chairperson	Chong Kee Hiong
Members	Henry Kwek; Lim Biow Chuan; Louis Ng; Carrie Tan; Nadia Ahmad Samdin; Xie Yao Quan
Social and Family Development
Chairperson	Melvin Yong
Deputy Chairperson	vacant
Members	Denise Phua; Murali Pillai; Tin Pei Ling; Carrie Tan; Fahmi Aliman; Ng Ling Ling
Sustainability and the Environment
Chairperson	Louis Ng
Deputy Chairperson	Poh Li San
Members	Cheryl Chan; Gan Thiam Poh; Lim Wee Kiak; Nadia Ahmad Samdin; Don Wee
Transport
Chairperson	Saktiandi Supaat
Deputy Chairperson	Melvin Yong
Members	Lim Biow Chuan; Ang Wei Neng; Gan Thiam Poh; Poh Li San; Yeo Wan Ling

== See also ==
- Lists of members of parliament in Singapore
