= Goh Hanyan =

Singaporean politician

The Honourable Goh Hanyan
- 吴函燕
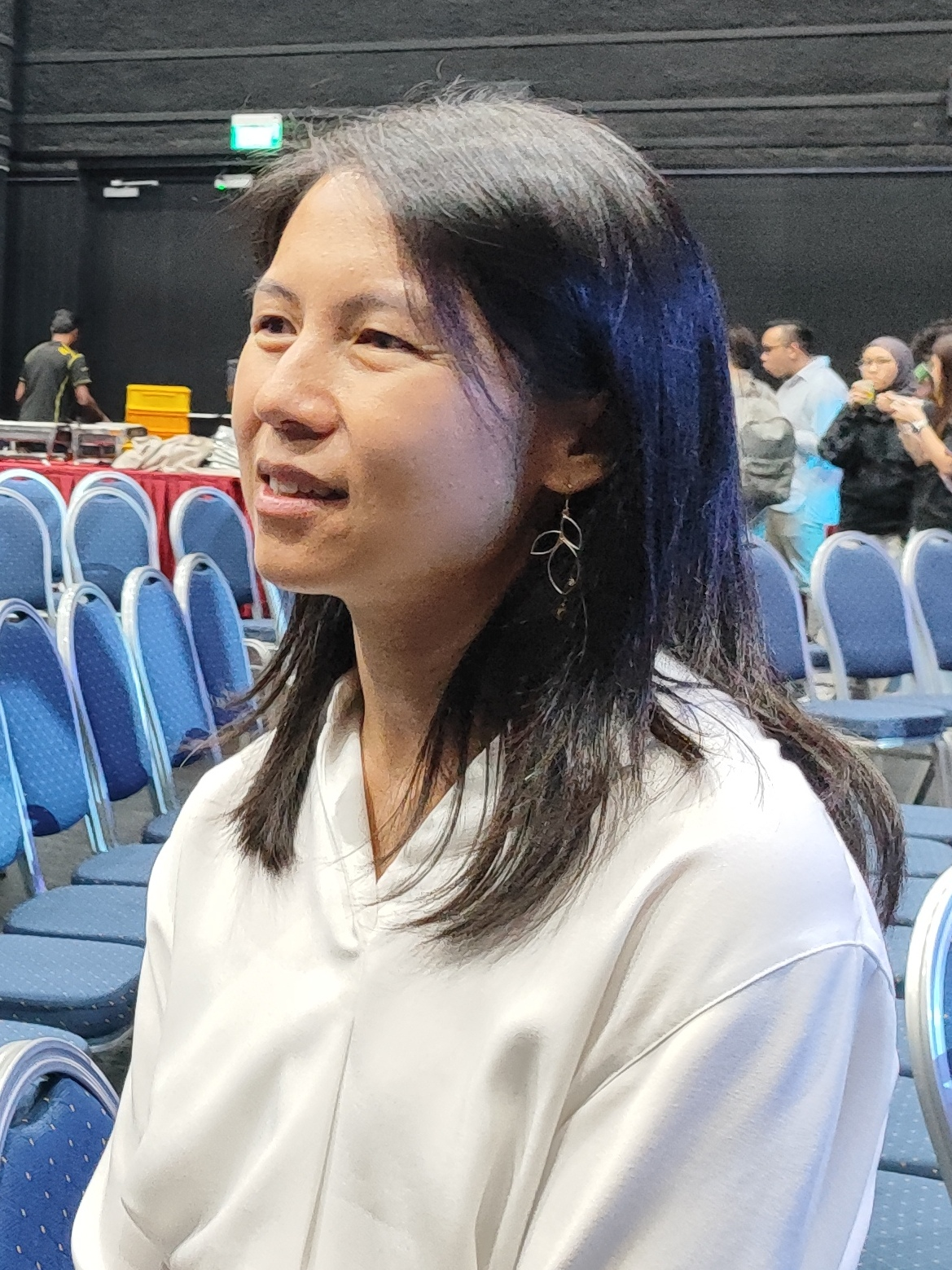
- Goh in 2026

Member of the Singapore Parliament for Nee Soon GRC
- Incumbent
- Assumed office 3 May 2025
- Preceded by: PAP held
- Majority: 66,436 (47.62%)

Personal details
- Born: 1985 or 1986 Singapore
- Party: People's Action Party
- Education: Columbia University

Goh Hanyan (Note: Chinese: 吴函燕; pinyin: Wú Hányàn; Pe̍h-ōe-jī: Gô͘ Hâm-iàn) (born 1985 or 1986) is a Singaporean politician and former civil servant. A member of the People's Action Party (PAP), she has served as the Member of Parliament (MP) representing the Nee Soon Central division of Nee Soon Group Representation Constituency (GRC) since the 2025 general election.

== Early life and career ==
Goh was born in Singapore in either 1985 or 1986. Her mother was a secondary school mathematics teacher, while her father was a volunteer in Ang Mo Kio Group Representation Constituency (GRC). Goh got a master's degree in engineering management at Columbia University in 2009. After graduating, she worked at the Economic Development Board (EDB) and spent three years at EDB's Washington office. In 2016, she returned to Singapore.

Goh later worked under the Prime Minister’s Office in the economy and sustainability strategy group. In 2023, she joined the Ministry of Digital Development and Information (MDDI) as a director in the Smart Nation Strategy Office and the national artificial intelligence group for policy and strategy. On 3 April 2025, Goh resigned from her positions with MDDI, ahead of the 2025 general election. She was later spotted at a Meet-the-People session in Nee Soon GRC, accompanied by former politician Lee Bee Wah.

== Political career ==
On April 21, law and home affairs minister K. Shanmugam revealed his team for Nee Soon GRC, which consisted of Goh, Jackson Lam, Lee Hui Ying, and Syed Harun Alhabsyi. Incumbent Nee Soon MPs Louis Ng, Carrie Tan, and Derrick Goh retired from politics, while minister of state Muhammad Faishal Ibrahim moved to contest at Marine Parade–Braddell Heights GRC. At the 2025 general election, the PAP team went against the Red Dot United's (RDU) team, led by RDU's secretary-general Ravi Philemon. The PAP team won with 73.81% of the vote. Goh has served as the Chairman of the Nee Soon Town Council since 2025.

In May, Goh was appointed as senior parliamentary secretary to the ministries of culture, community and youth and sustainability and the environment.

== Personal life ==
Goh is married and has three children.

== Notes ==
Parliament of Singapore
| Preceded by K. Shanmugam; Derrick Goh; Carrie Tan; Louis Ng; Muhammad Faishal Ibrahim | Member of Parliament for Nee Soon GRC; 2025–present Served alongside: (2025–present): K. Shanmugam, Syed Harun Alhabsyi, Lee Hui Ying, Jackson Lam | Incumbent |
