= Jackson Lam =

Singaporean politician (born 1985)

The Honourable Jackson Lam
- 林纬量

Member of the Singapore Parliament for Nee Soon GRC
- Incumbent
- Assumed office 3 May 2025
- Preceded by: PAP held
- Majority: 66,436 (47.62%)

Personal details
- Born: Jackson Lam Weiliang; 8 January 1985 (age 41) Singapore
- Party: People's Action Party
- Education: University of Bedfordshire

Jackson Lam Weiliang (Note: Chinese: 林纬量; pinyin: Lín Wěiliàng) (born 8 January 1985) is a Singaporean politician. A member of the governing People's Action Party (PAP), he has been the Member of Parliament (MP) for the Nee Soon East division of Nee Soon Group Representation Constituency (GRC) since 2025.

== Education and career ==
Lam graduated with an Honours degree in Business Management from the University of Bedfordshire in 2013. He is also the treasurer of the Singapore Wushu Dragon & Lion Dance Federation.

== Political career ==
In 2013, Lam became a PAP activist for the Chong Pang division of Nee Soon GRC. He became the branch secretary in 2019.

In October 2023, Lam replaced Lee Hong Chuang as the PAP branch chairperson for Hougang Single Member Constituency (SMC), held by the Workers' Party (WP). He would serve until February 2025, when he was replaced by Marshall Lim.

In March 2025, Lam was spotted with K. Shanmugam in Nee Soon GRC; he would later be nominated as a PAP candidate for the constituency. He was elected into Parliament after the PAP team he belonged to defeated Ravi Philemon and his team representing Red Dot United (RDU) with 73.81% of the vote. Lam has served as the Vice-Chairman of the Nee Soon Town Council since 2025.

== Notes ==
Parliament of Singapore
Preceded by K. Shanmugam; Derrick Goh; Carrie Tan; Louis Ng; Muhammad Faishal Ibrahim	Member of Parliament for Nee Soon GRC; 2025–present Served alongside: (2025–present): K. Shanmugam, Syed Harun Alhabsyi, Lee Hui Ying, Goh Hanyan	Incumbent
