= Syed Harun Alhabsyi =

Singaporean politician

The Honourable Syed Harun Alhabsyi
- سَعِيد هارون الحبسي

Member of the Singapore Parliament for Nee Soon GRC
- Incumbent
- Assumed office 3 May 2025
- Preceded by: PAP held
- Majority: 66,436 (47.62%)

Nominated Member of Parliament
- In office 24 July 2023 – 14 February 2025

Personal details
- Born: Syed Harun bin Taha Alhabsyi; 1985 (age 40–41) Singapore
- Party: People's Action Party (2025–present)
- Other political affiliations: Independent (2023–2025)
- Education: National University of Singapore
- Occupation: Politician; psychiatrist

Syed Harun bin Taha Alhabsyi (Note: Jawi: سَعِيد هارون بن طه الحبسي) (born 1985) is a Singaporean politician and psychiatrist. A member of the governing People's Action Party (PAP), he has been the Member of Parliament (MP) for the Nee Soon Link division of Nee Soon Group Representation Constituency (GRC) since 2025. He had previously been a Nominated MP (NMP) between 2023 and 2025. He was the first former NMP to enter partisan politics.

First appointed as an NMP in 2023, Syed Harun resigned before completing his term to pursue a career in electoral politics, a move that drew criticism from former NMPs and observers who argued that it undermined the non-partisan intent of the scheme. While he defended his transition as a continuation of public service, it renewed debate about the purpose and neutrality of the NMP system.

== Education and career ==
Syed Harun studied at Raffles Institution and Victoria Junior College before graduating from the Yong Loo Lin School of Medicine at the National University of Singapore with a medical degree. He is a psychiatrist by profession.

== Political career ==
Syed Harun first entered Parliament in August 2023 after being nominated in July as an NMP for the 14th Parliament.

In February 2025, ahead of the general election in the same year, Syed Harun resigned before the end of his two-and-a-half-year term as an NMP, stating that he intended to "serve more directly through grassroots involvement". He subsequently joined the PAP and was fielded as a candidate for the five-member Nee Soon GRC.

In the second Lawrence Wong cabinet after the 2025 elecction, Syed Harun was appointed as Senior Parliamentary Secretary to the Ministry of Education and Ministry of National Development.

=== Controversies ===
==== Resignation as NMP and candidacy as a PAP MP ====
Prior to the general election, Syed Harun's move drew significant public and political scrutiny. Several former NMPs and commentators expressed concern about the erosion of the credibility of the NMP scheme when the position was used as a springboard into party politics. Critics argued that the NMP role was intended to provide independent, non-partisan perspectives, and that early resignations for electoral ambitions could undermine its perceived neutrality. Former NMPs also highlighted that while such transitions were legal, they were able to affect public trust in the scheme's original intent.

In response to the criticism, Syed Harun stated that he had acted independently during his NMP tenure and had not "initially intended to enter party politics", and that he eventually joined the PAP with a desire to "serve the public more effectively". K. Shanmugam, Minister for Law and Home Affairs, also defended the move, emphasising that the Constitution did not prohibit NMPs from joining political parties after resigning, while urging the public to assess candidates based on "integrity and contributions". Nevertheless, the event prompted renewed debate on whether clearer guidelines were necessary to regulate transitions from non-partisan to partisan political roles. Syed Harun was later elected after the PAP team he belonged to defeated Red Dot United (RDU) with 73.81% of the vote.

==== Integrity and parliamentary debate ====
In January 2026, during a parliamentary debate on a motion proposed by Leader of the House Indranee Rajah to remove Pritam Singh from his role as the Leader of the Opposition following his conviction, Syed Harun spoke about the importance of integrity and accountability in public office. During his speech, Syed Harun emphasised that leaders should "uphold the highest ethical standards". Workers' Party (WP) chairperson Sylvia Lim responded by questioning whether Syed Harun's own actions, specifically his resignation from his position as a NMP ahead of the 2025 general election, followed by his subsequent candidacy and election under a political party banner, raised questions about his "adherence to integrity" and the non-partisan expectations of the NMP scheme. Syed Harun denied that his integrity was in question, and stated that his decision to resign and later contest an election was "already a matter of public record".

== Notes ==
Parliament of Singapore
Preceded by K. Shanmugam; Derrick Goh; Carrie Tan; Louis Ng; Muhammad Faishal Ibrahim	Member of Parliament for Nee Soon GRC; 2025–present Served alongside: (2025–present): K. Shanmugam, Goh Hanyan, Lee Hui Ying, Jackson Lam	Incumbent
