= Henry Kwek =

Singaporean politician (born 1976)

The Honourable Henry Kwek
- 郭献川
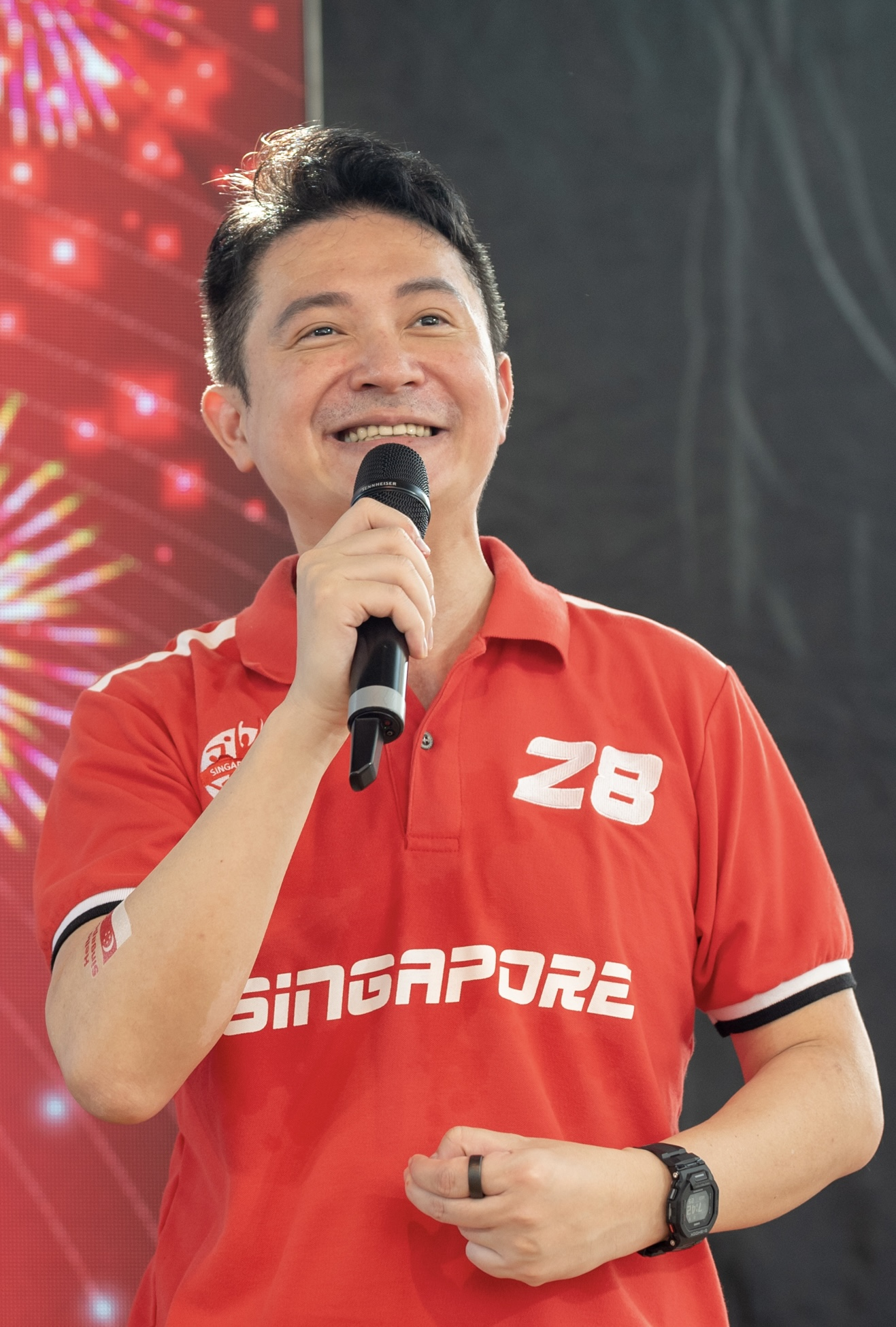
- Kwek in 2023

Member of Parliament for Kebun Baru SMC
- Incumbent
- Assumed office 10 July 2020
- Preceded by: Constituency established
- Majority: 2020: 5,467 (25.84%); 2025: 7,445 (36.98%)

Member of Parliament for Nee Soon GRC
- In office 11 September 2015 – 23 June 2020
- Preceded by: PAP held
- Succeeded by: PAP held
- Majority: 41,446 (33.66%)

Personal details
- Born: Henry Kwek Hian Chuan; 20 April 1976 (age 50) Singapore
- Party: People's Action Party
- Education: The Chinese High School; Victoria Junior College
- Alma mater: Stanford University
- Occupation: Politician; Entrepreneur

Henry Kwek Hian Chuan (Note: Chinese: 郭献川; Pe̍h-ōe-jī: Koeh Hiàn-chhoan) (born 20 April 1976) is a Singaporean politician. A member of the governing People's Action Party (PAP), he has been the Member of Parliament (MP) for Kebun Baru Single Member Constituency (SMC) since 2020. He had previously represented the Kebun Baru division of Nee Soon Group Representation Constituency (GRC) between 2015 and 2020.

== Education ==
Kwek was educated at The Chinese High School and Victoria Junior College before graduating from Stanford University with a Bachelor of Arts degree in Economics.

Kwek subsequently continued his studies at Stanford University and completed a Master of Science degree in management science.

== Career ==
In 2008, Kwek was appointed the executive director of Foodtraco Supplies, a Singapore-based trading, investment and consulting company.

=== Political career ===
Kwek made his political debut in the 2015 general election as part of a five-member PAP team contesting in Nee Soon GRC. He was assigned to the Kebun Baru ward after the PAP won with 66.83% of the vote. In the 2020 general election, he contested the then-new Kebun Baru SMC, which had been carved from Nee Soon GRC, against Kumaran Pillai from the Progress Singapore Party (PSP), winning with 62.97% of the vote.

In 2025, Kwek stood for reelection against Tony Tan from the PSP. Kwek won with an improved 68.5% of the vote. Kwek has served as the Chairman of the Ang Mo Kio Town Council (AMKTC) since 2025.

== Notes ==
Parliament of Singapore
Preceded by Lim Wee Kiak; K Shanmugam; Lee Bee Wah; Patrick Tay Teck Guan; Muhammad Faishal Ibrahim	Member of Parliament for Nee Soon GRC; 2015–2020; Served alongside: K. Shanmugam, Lee Bee Wah, Louis Ng, Muhammad Faishal Ibrahim	Succeeded by K. Shanmugam; Derrick Goh; Carrie Tan; Louis Ng; Muhammad Faishal Ibrahim
New constituency	Member of Parliament for Kebun Baru SMC; 2020–present	Incumbent
