= Lee Hui Ying =

Singaporean politician (born 1989)

The Honourable Lee Hui Ying
- 李蕙莹

Member of the Singapore Parliament for Nee Soon GRC
- Incumbent
- Assumed office 3 May 2025
- Preceded by: PAP held
- Majority: 66,436 (47.62%)

Personal details
- Born: 5 May 1989 (age 37) Singapore
- Party: People's Action Party
- Height: 176.5 cm (5 ft 9 in)
- Education: Nanyang Junior College

Lee Hui Ying (Note: Chinese: 李蕙莹; pinyin: Lǐ Huìyíng) (born 5 May 1989) is a Singaporean politician. A member of the People's Action Party, she has been a Member of Parliament for the Nee Soon Group Representation Constituency since 2025.

== Career ==
Lee has held positions in the communications role in the Ministry of Digital Development and Information, Ministry of Transport and Ministry of Health. She is presently the Director of Communications at Temasek Foundation, a non-profit organisation that supports diverse impactful programmes to uplift communities. Lee has served as the Vice-Chairman of the Nee Soon Town Council since 2025.

== Personal life ==
Lee is single, and is a middle child with 2 sisters.

== Notes ==
Parliament of Singapore
Preceded by K. Shanmugam; Derrick Goh; Carrie Tan; Louis Ng; Muhammad Faishal Ibrahim	Member of Parliament for Nee Soon GRC; 2025–present Served alongside: (2025–present): K. Shanmugam, Syed Harun Alhabsyi, Goh Hanyan, Jackson Lam	Incumbent
