= Lee Bee Wah =

Singaporean politician

- 李美花
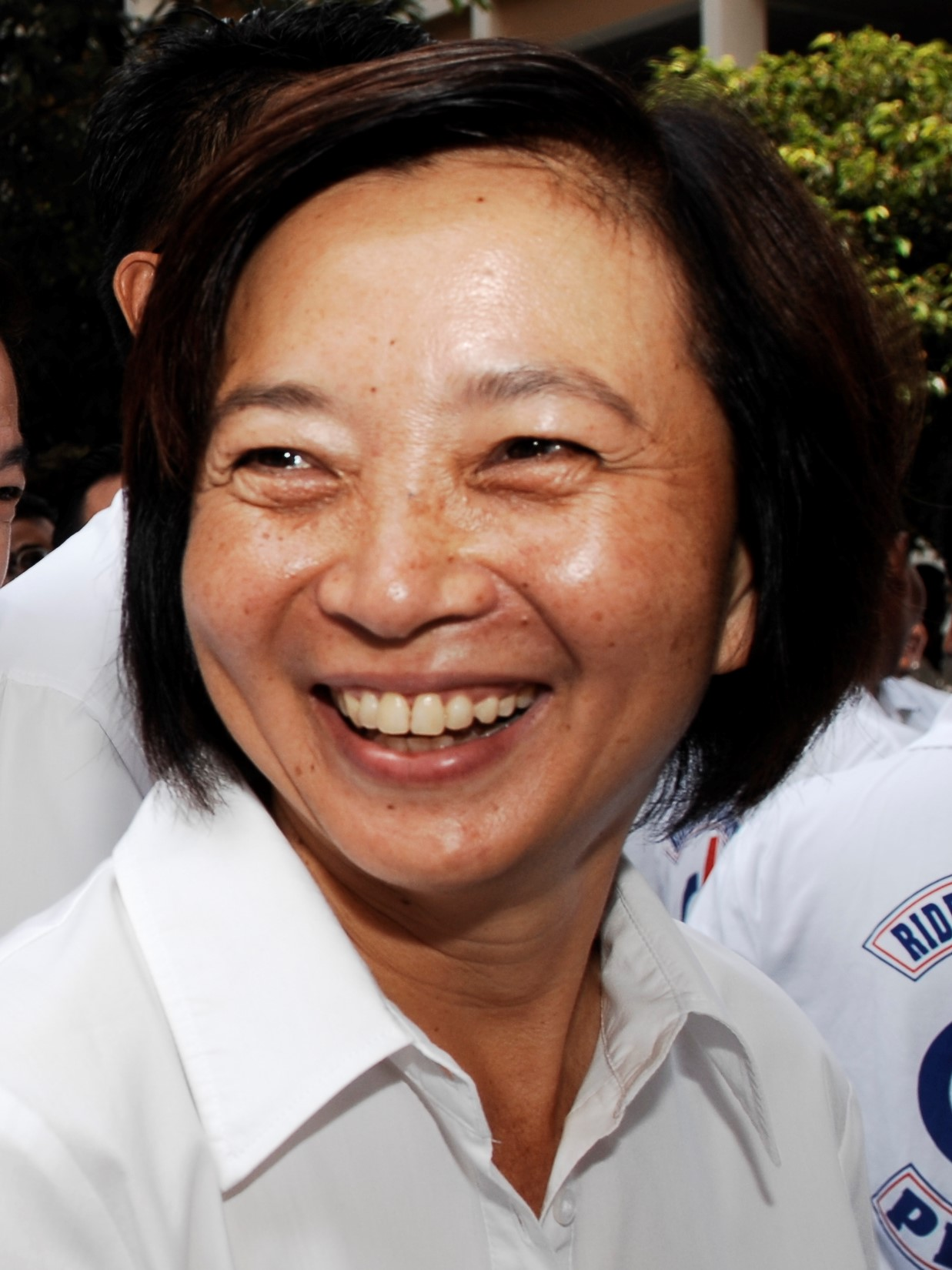
- Lee in 2011

Member of the Singapore Parliament for Nee Soon GRC
- In office 7 May 2011 – 23 June 2020
- Preceded by: Constituency established
- Succeeded by: PAP held
- Majority: 2011: 23,217 (16.80%); 2016: 41,446 (33.66%)

Member of the Singapore Parliament for Ang Mo Kio GRC
- In office 6 May 2006 – 19 April 2011
- Preceded by: PAP held
- Succeeded by: PAP held
- Majority: 47,157 (32.28%)

Personal details
- Born: 6 October 1960 (age 66) Batu Pahat, Johor, Federation of Malaya (now Malaysia)
- Party: People's Action Party
- Education: Nanyang Technological University (BEng); University of Liverpool (MS)
- Profession: Politician; engineer

Lee Bee Wah (Chinese: 李美花; pinyin: Lǐ Měihuā; born 6 October 1960), also known as Hua Jie (Chinese: 花姐; pinyin: Huājiě; lit. 'Sister Flower'), is a Singaporean former politician and engineer. A member of the governing People's Action Party (PAP), she was the Member of Parliament (MP), as part of different PAP teams, representing Ang Mo Kio Group Representation Constituency (GRC) between 2006 and 2011, Nee Soon GRC between 2011 and 2020.

== Early life ==
Lee was born on 6 October 1960 in Batu Pahat, Johor, Malaysia to two rubber tappers; however, she grew up in Malacca. She is the eldest of seven siblings.

== Education ==
Lee received her primary education at Kiow Min Chinese Primary School and subsequently studied at Sekolah Dato' Dol Said, Notre Dame Convent, and Gajah Berang.

She attended the National University of Singapore (NUS) between 1981 and 1982 before attending the Nanyang Technological University (NTU) where she graduated with a Bachelor of Engineering degree in civil engineering in 1985. She then attended the University of Liverpool between 1989 and 1990 where she attained a Master of Science degree in engineering.

In 2011, the University of Liverpool presented to her an Honorary Doctorate. She was awarded the Nanyang Distinguished Alumni Award from NTU in 2012.

== Career ==
Lee was the president of the Singapore Table Tennis Association (STTA) from 2008 till 2014.

=== Engineering career ===
An engineer by training, in 1996, Lee established LBW Consultants LLP. Her firm was acquired by global engineering consultancy Meinhardt Group, where she went on to be a group director, in 2014. Prior to joining politics, Lee was also a senior engineer at ST Construction and an assistant project manager at Wing Tai. She served as president of the Institution of Engineers Singapore from 2008 to 2010. She served as Non Executive Chairman of listed company TEE Land Pte Ltd and independent director of Koh Brothers Group.

In 2020, Lee retired from her engineering practice. She became chairperson to the advisory committee of the School of Civil and Environmental Engineering at Nanyang Technological University (NTU).

Described by her university as a "passionate" alumna, Lee started the Class of 1985 Pioneer Fund, a fundraising scheme which raised $3million dollars for academic incentives. In 1997, she became the NTU School of Civil & Environmental Engineering Alumni Association (NTU CEEAA)'s President until 2008. She was the recipient of the 2000 Nanyang Technological University Alumni Service Award by NTU. In 2006, Lee received the Nanyang Alumni Achievement Award from NTU.

=== Political career ===
Lee served as MP for Ang Mo Kio GRC from 2006 till 2011, and Nee Soon GRC from 2011 to 2020. She was the chairperson of the Government Parliamentary Committee for National Development as well as for the Environment and Water Resources.

In 2015, Lee was the subject of controversy when it was uncovered that LBW Consultants LLP had successfully tendered to provide civil and structural engineering services to the Housing and Development Board for projects within Nee Soon South ward, which was under her care at that time.

In 2019, Lee was criticised twice from the public over her parliament speeches. Lee spoke against community cat feeders whose "irresponsible cat feeding" led to pest issues in her Nee Soon South ward. Cat welfare society and animal lovers criticised her as there was a prior arrangement on responsible cat feeding and it was unfair that Lee targeted the community cat feeders for the pest issues. Lee was again criticised online for telling a story in Chinese about an "Ah Gong" (i.e. the Singaporean government) during a budget debate in Parliament. In her story, she referred to Singaporeans as "Si Gui Kia" (ungrateful brats) for apparent non-appreciation of what the government did for them. The video of her parliamentary speech quickly went viral.

In June 2020, Lee announced her retirement from politics and would not contest the 2020 Singaporean general election.

=== Business career ===
In 2022, real estate company Heeton Holdings appointed Lee as its independent non-executive director.

== Personal life ==
Lee is married with two children. She is a Buddhist.

Parliament of Singapore
Preceded by Balaji Sadasivan; Wee Siew Kim; Tan Boon Wan; Lee Hsien Loong; Seng Han Thong	Member of Parliament for Ang Mo Kio GRC; 2006–2011; Served alongside: Balaji Sadasivan, Inderjit Singh, Wee Siew Kim, Lam Pin Min, Lee Hsien Loong	Succeeded by Yeo Guat Kwang; Ang Hin Kee; Inderjit Singh; Intan Azura Mokhtar; Lee Hsien Loong; Seng Han Thong
New constituency	Member of Parliament for Nee Soon GRC; 2011–2020; Served alongside: (2011–2015): Lim Wee Kiak, Patrick Tay, K. Shanmugam, Muhammad Faishal Ibrahim (2015–2020): K. Shanmugam, Henry Kwek, Louis Ng, Muhammad Faishal Ibrahim	Succeeded by K. Shanmugam; Carrie Tan; Louis Ng; Muhammad Faishal Ibrahim
