= Faishal Ibrahim =

Singaporean academic and former politician (born 1968)

- فيصل إبراهيم
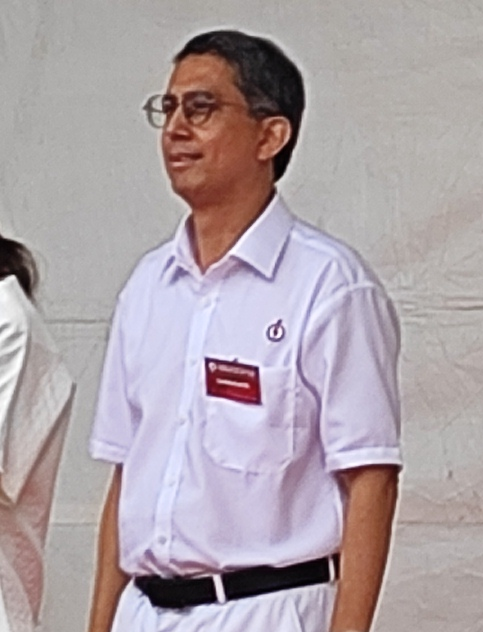
- Faishal in 2025

Minister-in-charge of Muslim Affairs
- Acting
- In office 23 May 2025 – 20 July 2026
- Prime Minister: Lawrence Wong
- Preceded by: Masagos Zulkifli
- Succeeded by: Zaqy Mohamad (Acting)

Member of the Singapore Parliament for Marine Parade–Braddell Heights GRC
- In office 23 April 2025 – 20 July 2026
- Preceded by: Constituency established
- Majority: N/A (walkover)

Member of the Singapore Parliament for Nee Soon GRC
- In office 7 May 2011 – 15 April 2025
- Preceded by: Constituency established
- Succeeded by: PAP held
- Majority: 2011: 23,217 (16.80%); 2015: 41,401 (33.66%); 2020: 33,177 (23.80%)

Member of the Singapore Parliament for Marine Parade GRC
- In office 27 April 2006 – 18 April 2011
- Preceded by: PAP held
- Succeeded by: PAP held
- Majority: N/A (walkover)

Personal details
- Born: Muhammad Faishal bin Ibrahim Khan Surattee; 16 June 1968 (age 58) Singapore
- Party: People's Action Party (2006–2026)

Muhammad Faishal bin Ibrahim Khan Surattee (Note: Jawi: محمد فيصل بن إبراهيم خن سورت) (born 16 June 1968) is a Singaporean academic and former politician who served as acting Minister-in-charge of Muslim Affairs from 2025 until his resignation in 2026. He previously served as Minister of State for Home Affairs and Minister of State for National Development concurrently between 2020 and 2025 and as Senior Minister of State for Home Affairs from 2025 to 2026. As a member of the governing People's Action Party (PAP), he was a Member of Parliament (MP) for Marine Parade Group Representation Constituency (GRC) between 2006 and 2011, for Nee Soon GRC between 2011 and 2025, and for Marine Parade–Braddell Heights GRC between 2025 and 2026.

Before entering politics, Faishal was an associate professor at the Department of Real Estate at the National University of Singapore (NUS). He made his political debut in the 2006 general election as part of a PAP team for Marine Parade GRC which won in a walkover. During the 2011 general election, he was redeployed to Nee Soon GRC, where he won re-election in the 2015 and 2020 general elections. During the 2025 general election, Faishal was redeployed to the PAP team for the five-member Marine Parade–Braddell Heights GRC, which won in a walkover.

In 2012, Faishal was appointed Parliamentary Secretary. He was promoted to Minister of State in 2020, and held portfolios in the Home Affairs and National Development Ministries. On 20 July 2026, Faishal resigned from Parliament and the PAP following a "lapse of judgment" that he was said to have committed while interacting with a female member of the public.

== Education ==
Faishal was educated at Telok Kurau East Primary School, Bedok South Primary School, Bedok View Secondary School and Nanyang Junior College. He then went to the National University of Singapore (NUS), where he completed a Bachelor of Science (Honours) in real estate management in 1993. In 1996, he completed a Master of Science in real estate management at NUS and graduated as the best overall student in his cohort. In 2000, he completed a Doctor of Philosophy in management science at the University of Manchester Institute of Science and Technology under a NUS Overseas Graduate Scholarship.

== Career ==
Faishal began his career at the Inland Revenue Authority of Singapore in 1993 after obtaining his bachelor's degree. After completing his master's degree in 1996, he joined the NUS Department of Real Estate as a senior tutor. In 2000, he became an associate professor at the NUS Department of Real Estate.

=== Political career ===
Faishal entered politics when he joined a six-member People's Action Party (PAP) team contesting in Marine Parade GRC during the 2006 general election. After the PAP team won by an uncontested walkover, Faishal became a Member of Parliament representing the Kaki Bukit ward of Marine Parade GRC.

During the 2011 general election, Faishal joined the five-member PAP team contesting in Nee Soon GRC as his Kaki Bukit ward in Marine Parade was absorbed into the neighbouring Aljunied GRC and they won with 58.4% of the vote against the Workers' Party. Faishal thus became a Member of Parliament representing the Nee Soon Central ward of Nee Soon GRC. On 1 August 2012, he was appointed Parliamentary Secretary at the Ministry of Health and Ministry of Transport.

Faishal contested in the 2015 general election in Nee Soon GRC again as part of a five-member PAP team, who won with 66.83% of the vote against the Workers' Party. On 1 October 2015, he was appointed Parliamentary Secretary at the Ministry of Education and Ministry of Social and Family Development. On 1 May 2017, he was promoted to Senior Parliamentary Secretary and continued serving at those two Ministries.

During the 2020 general election, Faishal remained as part of the five-member PAP team contesting in Nee Soon GRC and they won with 61.90% of the vote against the Progress Singapore Party. On 27 July 2020, Faishal was promoted to Minister of State and appointed to the Ministry of National Development and Ministry of Home Affairs.

Faishal has openly expressed objections to what he called Israel's use of "disproportionate force and violence, against the Palestinian people." During his time as acting Minister-in-charge of Muslim Affairs, Faishal had a tougher stance in the Gaza issue.

During the 2025 general election, Faishal joined the five-member PAP team contesting in the newly-redrawn Marine Parade-Braddell Heights GRC, consisting of incumbent MPs Seah Kian Peng and Tin Pei Ling, and newcomers Diana Pang and Goh Pei Ming. His team won uncontested after no other party contested the constituency. Faishal thus became the MP for Marine Parade-Braddell Heights GRC, representing the Kembangan ward. In May 2025, Faishal was appointed acting Minister-in-charge of Muslim Affairs replacing Masagos Zulkifli. He was also promoted as Senior Minister of State for Home Affairs. On 29 May 2025, in the aftermath of the elections, he was co-opted into the Central Executive Committee.

On 20 July 2026, Faishal resigned from Parliament and the PAP following what Prime Minister Lawrence Wong described as a "lapse of judgment" during his interactions with a female member of the public. Faishal was succeeded by Senior Minister of State Zaqy Mohamad as acting Minister-in-charge of Muslim Affairs, while his grassroots duties were succeeded by Firdaus Daud, a reserve candidate during the 2025 general election; Firdaus will not replace Faishal as a MP, with his ward's duties split among the remaining four MPs.

=== Post-political career ===
Following his resignation from office, Faishal was in discussions with the National University of Singapore to return to academia.

== Personal life ==
Faishal is married and has two children. One of his children is a President's Scholar.

== Notes ==
Political offices
Preceded by Zaqy Mohamad	Minister of State for National Development; 2020–2025; Served alongside: Tan Kiat How	Succeeded by Alvin Tan
Preceded by New office	Minister of State for Home Affairs; 2020–2025; Served alongside: Desmond Tan	Succeeded by Goh Pei Ming
Vacant Title last held by Desmond Lee; 2017	Senior Minister of State for Home Affairs; 2025–2026	Succeeded by Vacant
Preceded by Masagos Zulkifli	Minister-in-charge of Muslim Affairs; Acting; 2025–2026	Succeeded by Zaqy Mohamad
Parliament of Singapore
Preceded by R Ravindran; Othman Haron Eusofe; Mohamad Maidin bin Packer Mohd; Goh Chok Tong; Andy Gan Lai Chiang; Lim Hwee Hua	Member of Parliament for Marine Parade GRC; 2006–2011; Served alongside: Seah Kian Peng, Fatimah Lateef, Ong Seh Hong, Goh Chok Tong and Lim Biow Chuan	Succeeded by Seah Kian Peng; Tan Chuan-Jin; Tin Pei Ling; Goh Chok Tong
New constituency	Member of Parliament for Nee Soon GRC; 2011–2025; Served alongside: (2011–2015): Lim Wee Kiak, K. Shanmugam, Lee Bee Wah and Patrick Tay (2015–2020): K. Shanmugam, Henry Kwek, Lee Bee Wah and Louis Ng (2020–2025): K. Shanmugam, Derrick Goh, Carrie Tan and Louis Ng	Succeeded by K. Shanmugam; Syed Harun Alhabsyi; Lee Hui Ying; Jackson Lam; Goh Hanyan
New constituency	Member of Parliament for Marine Parade–Braddell Heights GRC; 2025–2026; Served alongside: Diana Pang, Tin Pei Ling and Goh Pei Ming	Succeeded by Vacant
