= Kebun Baru Single Member Constituency =

Electoral division in Singapore

Kebun Baru
- Single-member constituency for the Parliament of Singapore
- Region: North-East Region, Singapore
- Electorate: 22,263

Current constituency
- Created: 2020; 6 years ago
- Seats: 1
- Party: People's Action Party
- Member: Henry Kwek
- Town Council: Ang Mo Kio
- Reformed from: Nee Soon GRC (2020)

The Kebun Baru Single Member Constituency (Note: Malay: Kawasan Undi Perseorangan Kebun Baru; Chinese: 哥本峇鲁单选区; Tamil: கெபுன் பாரு தனித்தொகுதி) is a single-member constituency (SMC) situated north-eastern Singapore. Recreated in 2020 after having been merged in 1991, it is managed by Ang Mo Kio Town Council (AMKTC). The current Member of Parliament (MP) for the constituency is Henry Kwek from the People's Action Party (PAP).

The constituency had previously existed as Kebun Baru Constituency from 1980 to 1988, before being renamed Bukit Panjang Single Member Constituency from 1988 to 1991. In 1991, it was merged into Ang Mo Kio Group Representation Constituency (GRC) in the 1991 general election.

== History ==
Kebun Baru Constituency was established for the 1980 general election and was renamed Kebun Baru SMC in 1988. It was then abolished in 1991. From 1991 to 2020, Kebun Baru SMC did not exist.

Kebun Baru SMC was reformed prior to the 2020 general election. It was carved out of Nee Soon GRC, which it had belonged to as a division since 2015. Henry Kwek, the incumbent MP for the division, defeated Kumaran Pillai from the Progress Singapore Party (PSP) in the SMC with 62.92% of the vote.

In the 2025 general election, Kwek stood for reelection in Kebun Baru SMC. He defeated PSP candidate Tony Tan with an improved 68.5% of the vote.

== Member of Parliament ==
Interactive map of Kebun Baru SMC as of the 2025 general election

Year	Member	Party
Formation
2020	Henry Kwek	PAP
2025	Henry Kwek	PAP

== Electoral results ==
Note: The Elections Department does not include rejected votes when calculating the vote shares of candidates. Hence, all candidates' vote shares will total to 100% at any given election (may not appear so in multi-way contests due to rounding).

=== Elections in 2020s ===
General Election 2020
Party	Candidate	Votes	%
PAP	Henry Kwek	13,309	62.92
PSP	Kumaran Pillai	7,842	37.08
Majority		5,467	25.84
Total valid votes		21,151	98.20
Rejected ballots		387	1.80
Turnout		21,538	95.20
Registered electors		22,623	
PAP win (new seat)			

General Election 2025
Party	Candidate	Votes	%	±%
PAP	Henry Kwek	13,787	68.49	▲5.57
PSP	Tony Tan	6,342	31.51	▼5.57
Majority		7,445	36.98	▲11.13
Total valid votes		20,129	98.41	▲0.21
Rejected ballots		325	1.59	▼0.21
Turnout		20,454	91.87	▼3.33
Registered electors		22,263		▼1.59
PAP hold		Swing	▲5.57	
