= K. Shanmugam =

Singaporean politician (born 1959)

The Honourable K. Shanmugam SC
- கா. சண்முகம்
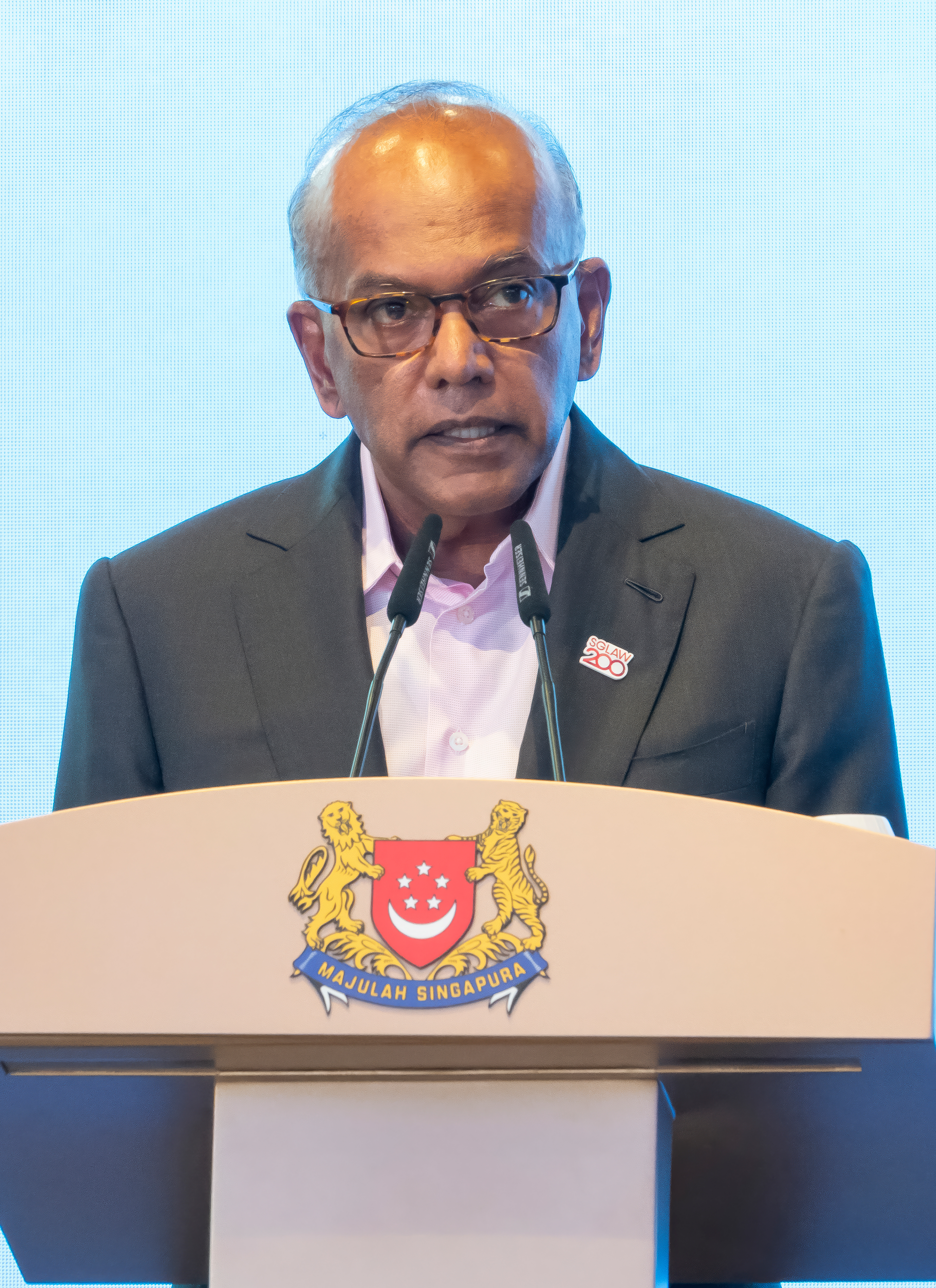
- Shanmugam in 2026

Minister for Home Affairs
- Incumbent
- Assumed office 1 October 2015
- Prime Minister: Lee Hsien Loong; Lawrence Wong
- Second Minister: Desmond Lee (2017); Josephine Teo (2017-2025); Edwin Tong (from 2025)
- Preceded by: Teo Chee Hean
- In office 1 November 2010 – 20 May 2011
- Prime Minister: Lee Hsien Loong
- Preceded by: Wong Kan Seng
- Succeeded by: Teo Chee Hean

Coordinating Minister for National Security
- Incumbent
- Assumed office 23 May 2025
- Prime Minister: Lawrence Wong
- Preceded by: Teo Chee Hean

Senior Minister of Singapore
- Incumbent
- Assumed office 27 July 2026 Serving with Lee Hsien Loong
- Prime Minister: Lawrence Wong
- Preceded by: Teo Chee Hean

Minister for Law
- In office 1 May 2008 – 22 May 2025
- Prime Minister: Lee Hsien Loong; Lawrence Wong
- Second Minister: Indranee Rajah (2018); Edwin Tong (2020–2025)
- Preceded by: S. Jayakumar
- Succeeded by: Edwin Tong

Minister for Foreign Affairs
- In office 21 May 2011 – 30 September 2015
- Prime Minister: Lee Hsien Loong
- Second Minister: Lui Tuck Yew (2011–2012); Grace Fu (2012–2015); Masagos Zulkifli (2015)
- Preceded by: George Yeo
- Succeeded by: Vivian Balakrishnan

Second Minister for Home Affairs
- In office 1 May 2008 – 31 October 2010
- Prime Minister: Lee Hsien Loong
- Minister: Wong Kan Seng
- Succeeded by: S. Iswaran (2011–2015); Masagos Zulkifli (2015)

Member of the Singapore Parliament for Nee Soon GRC
- Incumbent
- Assumed office 7 May 2011
- Preceded by: PAP held
- Majority: 2011: 23,217 (16.80%); 2015: 41,446 (33.66%); 2020: 33,177 (23.80%); 2025: 66,436 (47.62%)

Member of the Singapore Parliament for Sembawang GRC
- In office 3 September 1988 – 18 April 2011
- Preceded by: Constituency established
- Succeeded by: PAP held
- Majority: 1988: 20,718 (40.16); 1991: N/A (walkover); 1997: N/A (walkover); 2001: N/A (walkover); 2006: 90,633 (53.40%)

Personal details
- Born: Kasiviswanathan Shanmugam; 26 March 1959 (age 67) Colony of Singapore
- Party: People's Action Party
- Spouse: Jothie Rajah (divorced) Seetha Subbiah (m. 2008)
- Children: 2
- Education: National University of Singapore (LLB)

Kasiviswanathan Shanmugam (Note: Tamil: காசிவிஸ்வநாதன் சண்முகம், romanized: Kācivisvanātaṉ Caṇmukam) (born 26 March 1959) is a Singaporean politician and lawyer who has been serving as Senior Minister since 2026, Coordinating Minister for National Security since 2025, and Minister for Home Affairs since 2015. He was the Minister for Law from 2008 to 2025. A member of the governing People's Action Party (PAP), he has been the Member of Parliament (MP) representing the Chong Pang division since 1988—initially under the Sembawang Group Representation Constituency (GRC) before it became part of Nee Soon GRC in 2011.

A lawyer by profession, Shanmugam made a name for himself in litigation, arbitration and insolvency cases before he entered politics. In 1998, at the age of 39, he was one of the youngest lawyers in Singapore to be appointed Senior Counsel. Along with Davinder Singh, he was known as one of the "twin titans of litigation" and a prominent figure in Singapore's legal circles. He has been recognized for his skills in cross-examination and has represented clients both for and against former prime ministers of Singapore in civil lawsuits. Over 100 of his cases have been reported in Singapore's law reports.

Shanmugam joined politics in 1988 while being a praticising lawyer, before leaving in 2011 to serve in the cabinets of Lee Hsien Loong and later Lawrence Wong. On 27 July, he was appointed a Senior Minister in a cabinet reshuffle by Lawrence Wong. He is the first Senior Minister who has not previously served as Prime Minister or Deputy Prime Minister.

== Education ==
Shanmugam was educated at Raffles Institution from 1972 to 1977. He went on to read law at the National University of Singapore's Faculty of Law and graduated in 1984.

During his time in law school, Shanmugam received several awards, book prizes and scholarships for his academic performance from first to third years (1982–1983). He also won the Montrose Memorial Prize for Jurisprudence (1984).

Shanmugam received the Adrian Clarke Memorial Medal, the Leow Chia Heng Prize and the External Examiner's Prize (1984) as the top law student of his graduating class and in the final-year examinations. He also represented Singapore in the Philip C. Jessup International Law Moot Court Competition in 1984, in which his team won Runner-Up in the International Division.

== Legal career ==
After being admitted to the Singapore Bar as an advocate and solicitor in 1985, Shanmugam joined Drew & Napier in 1986 and left in 1991. He later joined Allen & Gledhill and in 1998 became a senior partner and Head of Litigation and Dispute Resolution.

In 1998, Shanmugam became one of the youngest lawyers to be appointed Senior Counsel of the Supreme Court at the age of 38.

Shanmugam has acted for Singapore's Prime Minister Lee Hsien Loong and his predecessors (Lee Kuan Yew and Goh Chok Tong) in lawsuits. In 1995, the International Herald Tribune selected Shanmugam to represent them after the Lees and Goh initiated a civil libel lawsuit against the newspaper. Lee later stated that the Tribune's decision to choose Shanmugam to represent them even though he was a PAP member and was close to the Lees and Goh, was the highest form of praise to the Senior Counsel's integrity and to the integrity of the Singapore Government as a whole.

== Political career ==
=== Backbencher (1988–2008) ===
At the age of 29, Shanmugam entered politics when he joined the People's Action Party (PAP) team contesting in Sembawang GRC in the 1988 general election. The PAP team won and Shanmugam was elected the Member of Parliament (MP) representing the Chong Pang division of Sembawang GRC, becoming the youngest MP in the 7th Parliament.

Shanmugam served as a MP while continuing to practise law until 2008, when he joined the Cabinet.

=== As Minister (2008–present) ===
Shanmugam joined the Cabinet in 2008 to replace S. Jayakumar as Minister for Law and was concurrently appointed Second Minister for Home Affairs. He succeeded Wong Kan Seng as Minister for Home Affairs in 2010.

In the 2011 general election, Shanmugam contested the newly formed Nee Soon GRC. Shanmugam relinquished his portfolio as Minister for Home Affairs and was appointed Minister for Foreign Affairs, while continuing to serve concurrently as Minister for Law.

Following Shanmugam's remarks on changes to the qualifying criteria for Singapore's elected presidency, he was criticised by former presidential candidate Tan Cheng Bock for pre-empting the legislative process and the Presidential Elections Committee, which decides the eligibility of candidates for the presidential election.

In February 2018, Shanmugam said that Singapore would change its criminal breach of trust (CBT) laws to address concerns that company directors and key officers of charities would face lower maximum penalties for CBT offences compared to their employees.

Shanmugam was a member of the Select Committee on Deliberate Online Falsehoods formed in 2018. During the public hearings, he questioned Simon Milner, Facebook's Vice President of Public Policy for Asia-Pacific, about the misuse of online data by Cambridge Analytica., and crossed swords with historian Thum Ping Tjin over a paper about Operation Coldstore written by Thum in 2013.

Shanmugam has long served on the Central Executive Committee of the PAP, which is the party's highest decision-making body.

In 2021, after the passing of the Foreign Interference (Countermeasures) Act 2021, activist Thum Ping Tjin claimed that the bill was a "coup" attempt by Shanmugam as Minister for Home Affairs, making him "the most powerful man in Singapore". Shanmugam has refuted the claim.

In September 2024, Singapore Democratic Party leader Chee Soon Juan, in an open letter, expressed concern over the lack of transparency and media coverage of Shanmugam's sale of his Good Class Bungalow at Astrid Hill. Despite the apparent conflict of interest, Shanmugam has refrained from commenting about the sale to the Singapore media.

A voter sentiment survey conducted in June 2024 found that Shanmugam was the most polarising politician in Singapore. The gap in Shanmugam's likeability between PAP supporters and opposition supporters was found to be the highest.

On 12 March 2025, Shanmugam was confronted by two women at his Meet-The-People session to address Protection from Online Falsehoods and Manipulation Act (Pofma). The PAP said that they were members of the Monday of Palestine Solidarity group.

During the 2025 general election, Shanmugam's team for Nee Soon GRC was dismantled with Carrie Tan, Derrick Goh and Louis Ng retiring and Muhammad Faishal Ibrahim moving to the newly formed Marine Parade–Braddell Heights GRC. Shanmugam led a team of newcomers— Goh Hanyan, Jackson Lam, Lee Hui Ying and Syed Harun Alhabsyi, to contest the GRC against Red Dot United. Shanmugam's team won the contest with 73.81% of the vote.

On 22 July 2026, Shanmugam was appointed, effective 27 July, as a Senior Minister in a cabinet reshuffle by Prime Minister Lawrence Wong.

== Other appointments ==
Shanmugam served on the board of directors for several companies before his appointment to the Singapore Cabinet.

=== Directorships ===
- Non-Executive Director of Sembcorp (July 1998 – April 2008)
- Director of Asia Food & Properties (July 1997 – 2001)
- Director of Golden Agri-Resources (May 1999 – 2001)

=== Board ===
- Advisory Board of the Faculty of Law
- Raffles Institution Board of Governors
- Media Development Authority
- Sembawang Corporation Industries Ltd

Shanmugam served as the President of the Singapore Indian Development Association (SINDA) from March 2002 to March 2009. Since October 2023, he has been the Chairman of the SINDA Board of Trustees.

== Personal life ==
Shanmugam is married to Seetha Subbiah. Shanmugam previously married Jothie Rajah and later divorced. They have two children together.

Shanmugam is a practising Hindu. He is also often involved in various religious activities organised by communities of various faiths. He has met Pope Francis in the Vatican City and has referred to the pontiff as exemplifying the "essence of religion" and a "strong advocate of interfaith dialogue and understanding".

Shanmugam also participates regularly in the Taoist Nine Emperor God's festival in his constituency since he became an MP for the area.

=== Ridout Road rentals ===
In 2023, Shanmugam and Vivian Balakrishnan were investigated by the Corrupt Practices Investigation Bureau for their rentals of state-owned bungalows at Ridout Road. The ministers called for an independent investigation, and Prime Minister Lee Hsien Loong directed the CPIB to look into the matter. In June 2023, the CPIB found no evidence of corruption, wrongdoing, preferential treatment or abuse of position by the ministers. It reported that the rental was made at market rates through a property agent. The issue was discussed in Parliament in July 2023, where the Opposition accepted that there was no corruption, and it was noted that first generation of leaders under Lee Kuan Yew had also rented similar state properties.

During the parliamentary debate, Shanmugam said that investigators from the CPIB had reviewed his communications. He noted that his text messages were set to be automatically deleted, but that relevant messages were obtained from other parties and examined as part of the investigation.

In August 2023, Shanmugam and Vivian Balakrishnan initiated legal proceedings in the Singapore High Court against Lee Hsien Yang, alleging defamation in relation to statements he made in a Facebook post regarding the rentals of the Ridout Road properties. In November, the High Court ruled that the statements were defamatory and issued judgment in favor of Shanmugam and Balakrishnan. The CPIB subsequently found that neither Shanmugam nor Balakrishnan had committed any wrongdoing.

On 16 December 2024, Shanmugam announced that he was initiating legal action against various media outlets, including Bloomberg, in respect of an article about good class bungalow transactions in Singapore mentioning property transactions involving Shanmugam and Tan See Leng. Shanmugam and Tan both alleged that the article was libellous. In March 2026, Terry Xu of The Online Citizen was ordered to pay Shanmugam and Tan, S$210,000 each for defaming them in an article about the transactions. On 7 April 2026, the defamation trial against Bloomberg started.

== Notes ==
Political offices
Preceded by S. Jayakumar	Minister for Law; 2008–2025	Succeeded by Edwin Tong
Preceded by Wong Kan Seng	Minister for Home Affairs; 2010–2011	Succeeded by Teo Chee Hean
Preceded by George Yeo	Minister for Foreign Affairs; 2011–2015	Succeeded by Vivian Balakrishnan
Preceded by Teo Chee Hean	Minister for Home Affairs; 2015–present	Incumbent
Preceded by Teo Chee Hean	Coordinating Minister for National Security; 2025–present	Incumbent
Parliament of Singapore
New constituency	Member of Parliament for Sembawang GRC; 1988–2011; Served alongside: (1988-1991): Charles Chong, Tony Tan (1991-1997): Lee Yiok Seng, Ho Peng Kee, Tony Tan (1997-2001): Teo Ho Pin, Hawazi Daipi, Ho Peng Kee, Tony Tan, Chin Tet Yung (2001-2006): Maliki Osman, Warren Lee, Hawazi Daipi, Tony Tan, Chin Tet Yung (2006-2011): Maliki Osman, Lim Wee Kiak, Hawazi Daipi, Khaw Boon Wan, Ellen Lee	Succeeded by Vikram Nair; Hawazi Daipi; Khaw Boon Wan; Ellen Lee; Ong Teng Koon
New constituency	Member of Parliament for Nee Soon GRC; 2011–present Served alongside: (2011-2015): Lim Wee Kiak, Lee Bee Wah, Patrick Tay Teck Guan, Muhammad Faishal Ibrahim (2015-2020): Henry Kwek, Lee Bee Wah, Louis Ng, Muhammad Faishal Ibrahim (2020-2025): Derrick Goh, Carrie Tan, Louis Ng, Muhammad Faishal Ibrahim (2025-present): Syed Harun Alhabsyi, Lee Hui Ying, Jackson Lam, Goh Hanyan	Incumbent
