= Derrick Goh =

Singaporean politician (born 1968)

- 吴顺喜
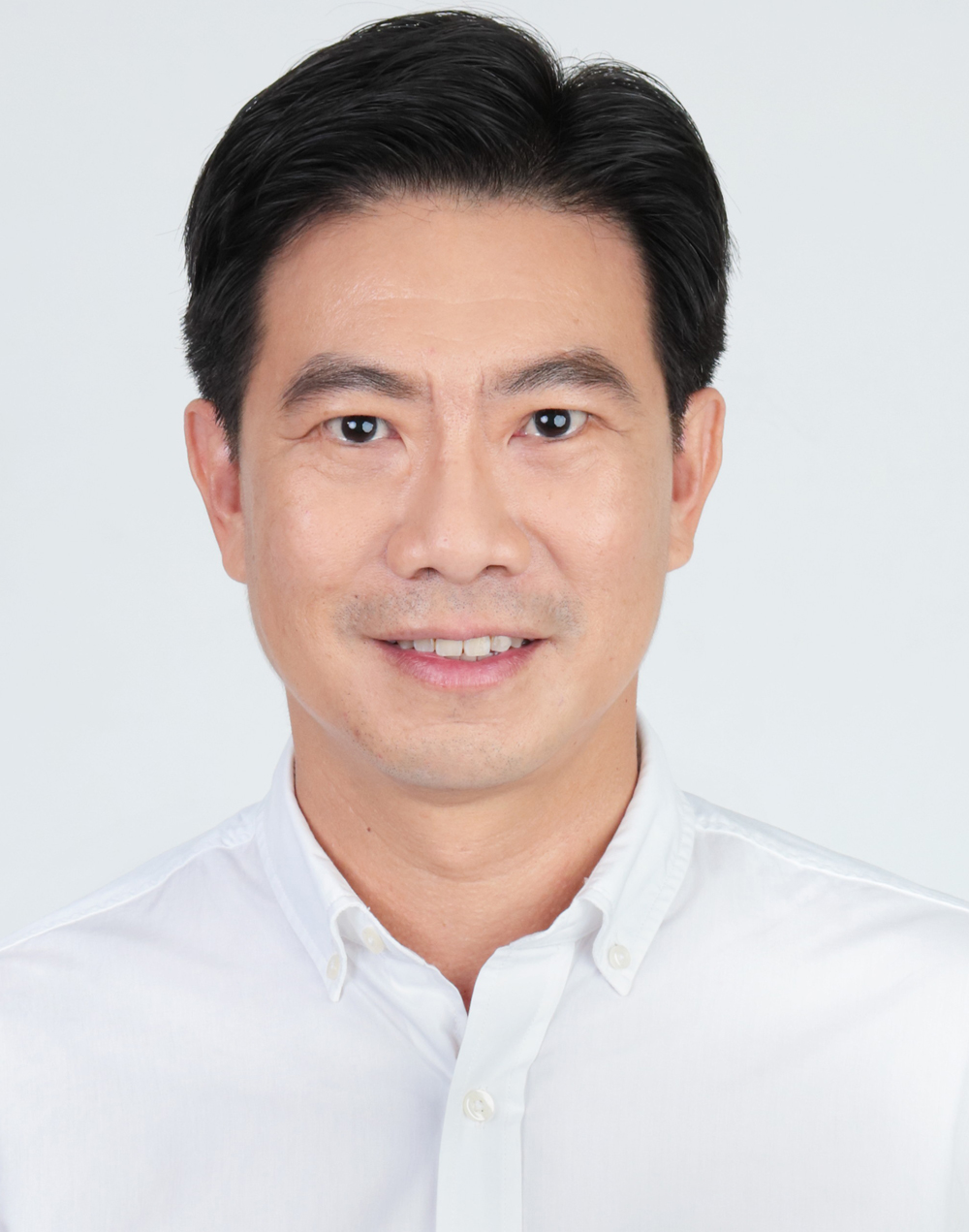
- Official portrait, 2021

Member of Parliament for Nee Soon GRC (Nee Soon Link)
- In office 10 July 2020 – 15 April 2025
- Majority: 33,149 (23.80%)
- Preceded by: Constituency established
- Succeeded by: Syed Harun Alhabsyi

Personal details
- Born: 4 July 1968 (age 57) Singapore
- Party: People's Action Party

Derrick Goh Soon Hee (Chinese: 吴顺喜; pinyin: Wú Shùnxǐ; born 4 July 1968) is a Singaporean banker and former politician. A member of the governing People's Action Party (PAP), he has been the Member of Parliament (MP) representing the Nee Soon Link division of Nee Soon Group Representation Constituency from 2020 to 2025.

== Early life and education ==
Goh was born into a family of three siblings. He graduated from Nanyang Technological University with a Bachelor of Accountancy (with Honours) in 1992. Goh obtained a Master of Business Administration (with Honours) in Finance at The Wharton School in 2006 under a scholarship from American Express (Amex).

== Career ==
Goh spent more than ten years at American Express, and was based in London and New York. Goh joined DBS Bank in 2008, and was its Chief Operating Officer for Institutional Banking Group before becoming the head of its subsidiary, POSB Bank, on 1 October 2012. On 9 March 2016, Goh became the managing director and regional head of DBS Treasures Private Client and DBS Treasures. He became the managing director and the head of audit at DBS Bank at the start of 2018.

In 2025, DBS Bank appointed Goh as group chief operating officer (COO), a newly created role in the bank. As group COO, Goh is in charge of the bank’s operations and transformation divisions, and join its executive committee.

Since 2013, Goh has been volunteering as a district councillor with the South West Community Development Council.

=== Political career ===
Goh was fielded in the 2020 general election to contest in Nee Soon Group Representation Constituency (GRC), on the People's Action Party's ticket against the Progress Singapore Party. His running mates were K. Shanmugam, Louis Ng, Faishal Ibrahim, and Carrie Tan. On 11 July 2020, Goh and team were declared to be elected to represent Nee Soon GRC in the 14th Parliament of Singapore, garnering 61.9% of the valid votes.

On 1 September 2020, Goh gave his maiden parliamentary speech where he used examples of residents' feedback on Self-Employed Person Income Relief Scheme (SIRS), as part of COVID-19 Solidarity budget in Singapore, to highlight the importance of good implementation with good policies Goh was appointed as Chairman of Nee Soon Town Council (NSTC) since 2020.

Prior to the 2025 general election, it was announced Goh will not contest the GRC due to his new role in DBS Bank, which will require him to travel often and thus be unable to commit time to the electorate.

== Personal life ==
Goh is married with three children.

Parliament of Singapore
New constituency	Member of Parliament for Nee Soon GRC (Nee Soon Link); 2020 – present	Incumbent
