= Nee Soon Group Representation Constituency =

Electoral division in Singapore

Nee Soon
- Group representation constituency for the Parliament of Singapore
- Region: North Region, Singapore
- Electorate: 151,874

Current constituency
- Created: 2011; 15 years ago
- Seats: 5
- Party: People's Action Party
- Members: Goh Hanyan; K. Shanmugam; Jackson Lam; Lee Hui Ying; Syed Harun Alhabsyi
- Town Council: Nee Soon
- Created from: Ang Mo Kio GRC; Nee Soon Central SMC; Nee Soon East SMC; Sembawang GRC

The Nee Soon Group Representation Constituency is a five-member group representation constituency (GRC) in northern Singapore. It has five divisions: Chong Pang, Nee Soon Central, Nee Soon East, Nee Soon Link and Nee Soon South, managed by Nee Soon Town Council. The current Members of Parliament (MPs) for the constituency are Senior Minister, Coordinating Minister for National Security and Minister for Home Affairs K. Shanmugam, Goh Hanyan, Jackson Lam, Lee Hui Ying and Syed Harun Alhabsyi from the governing People's Action Party (PAP).

== History ==
=== Creation (2011) ===
Nee Soon GRC was created for the 2011 general election. It comprised parts of the GRCs of Ang Mo Kio and Sembawang, as well as the single-member constituencies (SMCs) of Nee Soon Central and Nee Soon East. Led by K. Shanmugam, the PAP team defeated the Workers' Party (WP) with 58.40% of the vote.

=== 2015 ===
During the 2015 general election, the Canberra division and portions of Chong Pang, Nee Soon East and Nee Soon South divisions from Nee Soon GRC (forming Gambas division) were moved back to Sembawang GRC while Kebun Baru division of Ang Mo Kio GRC was moved here instead. The PAP once again faced off a challenge from the Workers' Party team winning an improved 66.83% of the vote.

=== 2020 ===
Prior to the 2020 general elections, the Kebun Baru division was carved out as an SMC due to the rising population of the GRC. Lee Bee Wah retired from politics and was replaced by Carrie Tan. While the Workers' Party did not contest in Nee Soon GRC, the Progress Singapore Party contested here instead. The PAP managed to retain the GRC with 61.90% of the vote against the PSP's 38.10%.

=== 2025 elections ===
Prior to the 2025 general election, Shanmugam announced that he will be leading a new team for the GRC with four new members, former Nominated MP Syed Harun Alhabsyi, Jackson Lam (former PAP Hougang branch chairman), Lee Hui Ying and Goh Hanyan. Former incumbent MPs Louis Ng, Carrie Tan and Derrick Goh announced their retirement from politics, while Muhammad Faishal Ibrahim moved to Marine Parade-Braddell Heights GRC.

== Members of Parliament ==
Divisions or wards of Nee Soon GRC as of the 2025 general election:
1 Chong Pang
2 Nee Soon Central
3 Nee Soon East
4 Nee Soon Link
5 Nee Soon South

Year	Division	Members of Parliament	Party
Formation
2011	Canberra; Chong Pang; Nee Soon South; Nee Soon East; Nee Soon Central	Lim Wee Kiak; K Shanmugam; Lee Bee Wah; Patrick Tay Teck Guan; Muhammad Faishal Ibrahim	PAP
2015	Chong Pang; Kebun Baru; Nee Soon South; Nee Soon East; Nee Soon Central	K Shanmugam; Henry Kwek; Lee Bee Wah; Louis Ng Kok Kwang; Muhammad Faishal Ibrahim	PAP
2020	Chong Pang; Nee Soon Link; Nee Soon South; Nee Soon East; Nee Soon Central	K. Shanmugam; Derrick Goh; Carrie Tan; Louis Ng; Muhammad Faishal Ibrahim	PAP
2025	Chong Pang; Nee Soon Link; Nee Soon South; Nee Soon East; Nee Soon Central	K. Shanmugam; Syed Harun Alhabsyi; Lee Hui Ying; Jackson Lam; Goh Hanyan	PAP

== Electoral results ==
Note: The Elections Department does not include rejected votes when calculating the vote shares of candidates. Hence, all candidates' vote shares will total to 100% at any given election (may not appear so in multi-way contests due to rounding).

=== Elections in 2010s ===
General Election 2011
Party	Candidate	Votes	%
PAP	K. Shanmugam Lim Wee Kiak Lee Bee Wah Muhammad Faishal Ibrahim Patrick Tay	80,740	58.40
WP	Angela Faye Oon John Yam Poh Lee Guan Sanjeev Kamalasanan Watson Chong Cham Weng	57,523	41.60
Majority		23,217	16.80
Total valid votes		138,263	96.26
Rejected ballots		2,341	3.74
Turnout		140,604	94.82
Registered electors		148,290	
PAP win (new seat)			

General Election 2015
Party	Candidate	Votes	%	±%
PAP	Henry Kwek K. Shanmugam Lee Bee Wah Louis Ng Muhammad Faishal Ibrahim	82,287	66.83	▲8.43
WP	Cheryl Loh Gurmit Singh S/O Sadhu Singh Kenneth Foo Luke Koh Ron Tan	40,841	33.17	▼8.43
Majority		41,446	33.66	▲11.34
Total valid votes		123,128	98.61	▲2.35
Rejected ballots		1,732	1.39	▼2.35
Turnout		124,860	94.38	▼0.44
Registered electors		132,289		▲3.38
PAP hold		Swing	▲8.32	

=== Elections in 2020s ===
General Election 2020
Party	Candidate	Votes	%	±%
PAP	Carrie Tan Derrick Goh K. Shanmugam Louis Ng Muhammad Faishal Ibrahim	86,308	61.90	▼4.93
PSP	Bradley Bowyer Damien Tay Kala Manickam Sri Nallakaruppan Taufik Supan	53,131	38.10	N/A
Majority		33,177	23.80	▼9.86
Total valid votes		139,439	98.45	▼0.16
Rejected ballots		2,200	1.55	▲0.16
Turnout		141,639	96.42	▲2.04
Registered electors		146,902		▲11.05
PAP hold		Swing	▼4.93	

General Election 2025: Nee Soon GRC
Party	Candidate	Votes	%	±%
PAP	Goh Hanyan Jackson Lam K. Shanmugam Lee Hui Ying Syed Harun Alhabsyi	102,974	73.81	▲11.91
RDU	David Foo Pang Heng Chuan Ravi Philemon Sharon Lin Syed Alwi Ahmad	36,538	26.19	N/A
Majority		66,436	47.62	▲23.82
Total valid votes		139,512	97.83	▼0.62
Rejected ballots		3,090	2.17	▲0.62
Turnout		142,602	93.89	▼2.53
Registered electors		151,874		▲3.38
PAP hold		Swing	▲11.91	
