= Carrie Tan =

Singaporean politician (born 1982)

- 陈浍敏
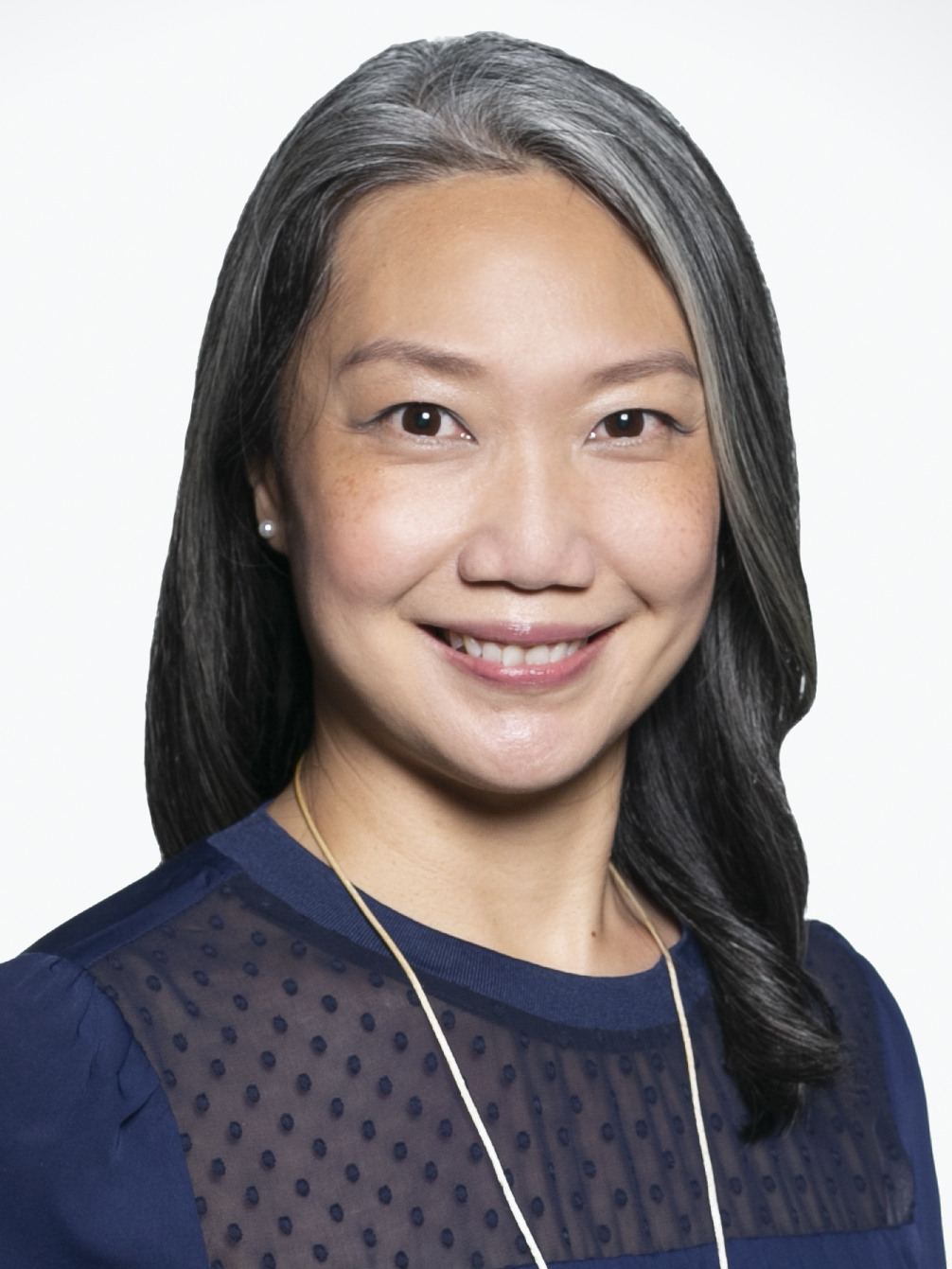
- Official portrait, 2020

Member of the Singapore Parliament for Nee Soon GRC (Nee Soon South)
- In office 10 July 2020 – 15 April 2025
- Preceded by: Lee Bee Wah
- Succeeded by: Lee Hui Ying
- Majority: 33,177 (23.80%)

Personal details
- Born: 11 April 1982 (age 44) Singapore
- Party: People's Action Party
- Education: National University of Singapore (BA, MPA)

Carrie Tan Huimin (Chinese: 陈浍敏; pinyin: Chén Huìmǐn; born 11 April 1982) is a Singaporean social entrepreneur and former politician. A member of the governing People's Action Party (PAP), she has been the Member of Parliament (MP) representing the Nee Soon South division of Nee Soon Group Representation Constituency from 2020 to 2025.

Prior to joining politics, Tan founded Daughters of Tomorrow (DOT), an organisation which enables livelihoods and financial self-sufficiency for underprivileged women in Singapore. She raises awareness about urban poverty in Singapore, and forges collaboration among private, public and non-profit sectors to enable social and economic mobility for vulnerable communities as part of her work with DOT.

Tan is a Young Southeast Asian Leaders Initiative fellow and her work in women's empowerment and advocacy for collaboration was mentioned by United States President Barack Obama at a press conference during Singapore Prime Minister Lee Hsien Loong's visit to the White House in August 2016.

== Early life and education ==
Tan was born in 1982 in Singapore to a taxi driver-turned-contractor father and a housewife, and has a sister. She was educated at Raffles Girls’ School and Raffles Junior College, before graduating from the National University of Singapore where she majored in history. Tan later went on to obtain a Master of Public Administration degree from the Lee Kuan Yew School of Public Policy, also at NUS.

== Professional career ==
Tan was a headhunter until 2012. After a volunteering trip to South India in 2007, she founded a social enterprise, Daughters of Tomorrow, which provided skills training for underprivileged women in India.

In 2014, Tan was featured in a CNA documentary, "A Singaporean Abroad", about her humanitarian work in India, training women from villages, who were rescued from sex-trafficking, in cottage industry skills.

In November 2015, Tan was selected to introduce United States President Barack Obama at a Town Hall meeting in Kuala Lumpur as part of the Young Southeast Asian Leaders Initiative. In May 2016, she was awarded Honoree for the Children, World Peace and Human Rights category in the Ten Outstanding Young Persons Award by Junior Chambers International in Singapore.

=== Daughters Of Tomorrow ===
Tan founded Daughters of Tomorrow (DOT) in 2012. DOT matches low-income women to job opportunities, advocates for their inclusion in government policies and provides job training programs for low-income women.

DOT was awarded the Most Investment-worthy Social Enterprise by the Asian Centre for Social Entrepreneurship & Philanthropy (ACSEP) of the National University of Singapore in 2015.

== Political career ==
Tan made her political debut in the 2020 general election when she succeeded Lee Bee Wah to contest in Nee Soon GRC as part of the five-member People's Action Party (PAP) team against the newly-formed Progress Singapore Party (PSP). Her running mates were K. Shanmugam, Louis Ng, Faishal Ibrahim, and Derrick Goh.

On 11 July 2020, the PAP team were declared to be elected to represent Nee Soon GRC in the 14th Parliament, garnering 61.9% of the vote. Tan was appointed as Vice-Chairperson of Nee Soon Town Council (NSTC) since 2020 to 2025.

Carrie did not stand in 2025 Singaporean general election, being replaced by Lee Hui Ying.

== Personal life ==
In a rush to get married before 30, Tan married after dating for three months when she was 29. The marriage was annulled after seven months of marriage due to differences between her and her husband that eventually led to a domestic violence episode. Carrie proposed to her boyfriend of 7 years, Kevin Teo on April 26, 2025. Teo has two boys from his previous marriage that ended in divorce in 2018.

Parliament of Singapore
Preceded by Lee Bee Wah	Member of Parliament for Nee Soon GRC (Nee Soon South); 2020–2025	Succeeded by Lee Hui Ying
