= Louis Ng =

Singaporean politician and founder of ACRES

- 黄国光
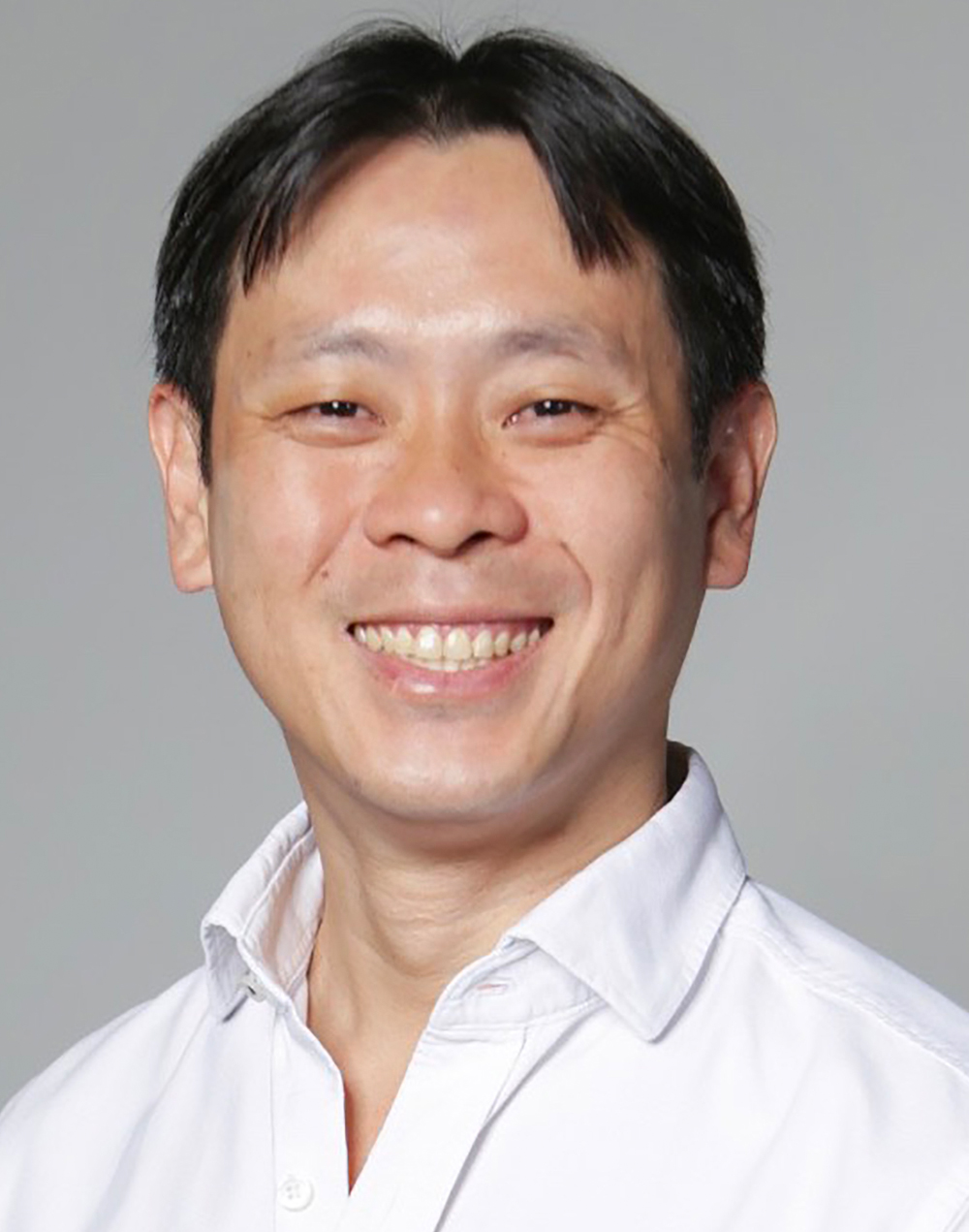
- Official portrait, 2021

Member of Parliament for Nee Soon GRC
- In office 11 September 2015 – 15 April 2025
- Preceded by: PAP held
- Succeeded by: PAP held
- Majority: 33,149 (23.80%)

Personal details
- Born: 8 December 1978 (age 47) Singapore
- Party: People's Action Party
- Spouse: Amy Corrigan
- Children: 3
- Education: National University of Singapore (BS); Oxford Brookes University (MS)

Louis Ng Kok Kwang (Chinese: 黄国光; pinyin: Huáng Guóguāng; born 8 December 1978) is a Singaporean retired politician and activist on animal welfare and the environment. A member of the governing People's Action Party (PAP), he was the Member of Parliament (MP) for the Nee Soon East division of Nee Soon Group Representation Constituency (GRC) between 2015 and 2025. He is also the founder of Animal Concerns Research and Education Society (ACRES).

== Education ==
Ng attended St. Gabriel's Secondary School and Catholic Junior College before graduating from the National University of Singapore in 2002 with a Bachelor of Science degree in biology. He also completed a Master of Science degree in primate conservation at Oxford Brookes University.

== Career ==
While still an undergraduate in 2001, Ng founded ACRES, an animal protection organisation aimed at fostering a spirit of volunteerism and working with the community to create awareness on animal protection issues. Upon graduating from the National University of Singapore in 2002, he began full-time work in ACRES, leading ACRES from a volunteer-run organisation to one with over 20 full-time staff and over S$1 million in funding in 2014.

=== Political career ===
On 26 August 2015, the PAP announced that Ng would be part of a five-member PAP team contesting in Nee Soon GRC in the 2015 general election. Ng was elected into Parliament after the five-member PAP team won 66.83% of the vote. On 24 August 2020, he was appointed as Chair of the Government Parliamentary Committee for Sustainability and Environment in the 14th Parliament.

In March 2021, the Singapore police announced they were investigating Ng for a possible offense under the Public Order Act of organising a public assembly without a permit. The alleged offense occurred when Ng visited a hawker centre in 2020 and held up a placard calling for the public to support hawkers. The Public Order Act makes it an offense to take part in a public assembly without a police permit. According to The Straits Times, "Under the Act, an 'assembly' means a gathering or meeting with the purpose of demonstrating support for, or opposing the views or actions of any person, group or government. It also applies to publicising a cause or campaign, marking or commemorating any event, and includes a demonstration by a person alone." In October 2022, the Attorney-General's Chambers announced that the investigation had concluded and no further action would be taken against Ng, stating, "Investigations have revealed that Mr Ng was exercising his duty as a Member of Parliament, in expressing care and support for the welfare of the hawkers in his constituency during the COVID-19 pandemic."

Prior to the 2025 general election, Ng announced his retirement from politics, stating that he wanted to spend more time with his children, after it was revealed that K. Shanmugam would lead four political newcomers in Nee Soon GRC.

=== Post-political career ===
On 1 August 2025, it was announced that Ng had become an Associate Professor at NUS College (NUSC), under the National University of Singapore (NUS), and that he would be teaching there.

== Awards ==
- In 2002, Ng received the HSBC/NYAA Youth Environmental (Merit) Award.
- In 2007, Ng was presented with The Outstanding Young Persons of Singapore Award.
- On 5 August 2011, Ng received the Yahoo! Singapore 9 Award (NGO category) which recognises 9 influential and inspiring Singaporeans from the past year.
- On 30 August 2014, Ng was awarded Advocate of the Year at the inaugural Singapore Advocacy Awards.

== Personal life ==
Ng's father, Robert Ng, is a division manager in an equipment firm, while his mother, Angela Quek, is a retired civil servant. He has an elder sister.

Ng is married to Amy Corrigan and they have three children.

Ng's love for animals started when he was a child. He would go to Ang Mo Kio Library after school and borrow books with animal themes. Wanting to become a veterinarian when he was younger, he volunteered with the Society for the Prevention of Cruelty to Animals and at the zoo.

When he set up the animal welfare group ACRES in 2001, his parents were worried about his future. His father "could not see a career in ACRES" as he was just drawing a monthly salary of S$500. However, both parents were supportive.

Parliament of Singapore
Preceded by Patrick Tay	Member of Parliament for Nee Soon GRC (Nee Soon East); 2015 – 2025	Succeeded by Jackson Lam
