= List of members of the 12th Parliament of Singapore =

Singapore's current electoral map indicating party of MP representing each constituency. People's Action Party Worker's Party

The 12th Parliament of Singapore was a meeting of the Parliament of Singapore. The Parliament is unicameral – all Members of Parliament (MPs) make up a single chamber, and there is no senate or upper house. The Constitution of Singapore states that the Parliament of Singapore shall consist of such a number of members who are elected by the people in a general election, up to nine Non-constituency Members of Parliament (NCMPs) and up to nine Nominated Members of Parliament (NMPs), following changes to the Constitution enacted on 26 April 2010. After the 2011 general election, 87 MPs were elected and three NCMPs were appointed (or, in terms of the Parliamentary Elections Act, declared elected) to Parliament.

== Elected Members of Parliament ==
Key
- Denotes Group Representation Constituencies (GRCs)
- Denotes Single Member Constituencies (SMCs)
- Denotes the Speaker of Parliament
- Denotes Cabinet members

Constituency	Name	Portrait	Date of birth (Age)	Party	Ref
Aljunied; GRC	**Chen** Show Mao		6 February 1961 (65 years, 284 days)	Workers' Party	
Aljunied; GRC	Sylvia **Lim**		28 March 1965 (61 years, 234 days)	Workers' Party	
Aljunied; GRC	**Low** Thia Khiang		5 September 1956 (70 years, 73 days)	Workers' Party	
Aljunied; GRC	**Muhamad Faisal** bin Abdul Manap	–	6 June 1975 (51 years, 164 days)	Workers' Party	
Aljunied; GRC	**Pritam** Singh		2 August 1976 (50 years, 107 days)	Workers' Party	
Ang Mo Kio; GRC	**Ang** Hin Kee	–	22 October 1965 (61 years, 26 days)	People's Action Party	
Ang Mo Kio; GRC	**Inderjit** Singh	–	5 June 1960 (66 years, 165 days)	People's Action Party	
Ang Mo Kio; GRC	**Intan** Azura binte Mokhtar	–	27 June 1976 (50 years, 143 days)	People's Action Party	
Ang Mo Kio; GRC	**Lee** Hsien Loong^{[I]}		10 February 1952 (74 years, 280 days)	People's Action Party	
Ang Mo Kio; GRC	**Seng** Han Thong	–	22 April 1950 (76 years, 209 days)	People's Action Party	
Ang Mo Kio; GRC	**Yeo** Guat Kwang	–	27 January 1961 (65 years, 294 days)	People's Action Party	
Bishan–Toa Payoh; GRC	**Hri** Kumar Nair	–	16 June 1966 (60 years, 154 days)	People's Action Party	
Bishan–Toa Payoh; GRC	**Ng** Eng Hen^{[II]}		10 December 1958 (67 years, 342 days)	People's Action Party	
Bishan–Toa Payoh; GRC	Josephine **Teo** née **Yeo**^{[III]}		8 July 1968 (58 years, 132 days)	People's Action Party	
Bishan–Toa Payoh; GRC	**Wong** Kan Seng		8 September 1946 (80 years, 70 days)	People's Action Party	
Bishan–Toa Payoh; GRC	**Zainudin** Nordin		3 July 1963 (63 years, 137 days)	People's Action Party	
Bukit Panjang SMC	**Teo** Ho Pin^{[IV]}	–	19 January 1960 (66 years, 302 days)	People's Action Party	
Chua Chu Kang; GRC	**Gan** Kim Yong^{[V]}		9 February 1959 (67 years, 281 days)	People's Action Party	
Chua Chu Kang; GRC	**Low** Yen Ling^{[VI]}	–	17 August 1974 (52 years, 92 days)	People's Action Party	
Chua Chu Kang; GRC	Alex **Yam** Ziming	–	20 June 1981 (45 years, 150 days)	People's Action Party	
Chua Chu Kang; GRC	Alvin **Yeo**	–	28 March 1962 (64 years, 234 days)	People's Action Party	
Chua Chu Kang; GRC	**Zaqy** Mohamad	–	15 September 1974 (52 years, 63 days)	People's Action Party	
East Coast; GRC	**Lee** Yi Shyan^{[VII]}	–	9 March 1962 (64 years, 253 days)	People's Action Party	
East Coast; GRC	Raymond **Lim** Siang Keat	–	24 June 1959 (67 years, 146 days)	People's Action Party	
East Coast; GRC	**Lim** Swee Say^{[VIII]}		13 July 1954 (72 years, 127 days)	People's Action Party	
East Coast; GRC	**Mohamad Maliki** bin Osman^{[IX]}		19 July 1965 (61 years, 121 days)	People's Action Party	
East Coast; GRC	Jessica **Tan** Soon Neo	–	28 May 1966 (60 years, 173 days)	People's Action Party	
Holland–Bukit Timah; GRC	Christopher **de Souza**		21 January 1976 (50 years, 300 days)	People's Action Party	
Holland–Bukit Timah; GRC	**Liang** Eng Hwa	–	20 March 1964 (62 years, 242 days)	People's Action Party	
Holland–Bukit Timah; GRC	**Sim** Ann^{[X]}		12 March 1975 (51 years, 250 days)	People's Action Party	
Holland–Bukit Timah; GRC	**Vivian** Balakrishnan^{[XI]}		25 January 1961 (65 years, 296 days)	People's Action Party	
Hong Kah North SMC	Amy **Khor** Lean Suan^{[XII]}	–	23 February 1958 (68 years, 267 days)	People's Action Party	
Hougang SMC	**Png** Eng Huat ^{A}		9 December 1961 (64 years, 343 days)	Workers' Party	
Joo Chiat SMC	Charles **Chong**^{[XIII]}	–	24 June 1953 (73 years, 146 days)	People's Action Party	
Jurong; GRC	**Ang** Wei Neng	–	31 March 1967 (59 years, 231 days)	People's Action Party	
Jurong; GRC	**Halimah** Yacob^{[XIV]}		23 August 1954 (72 years, 86 days)	People's Action Party	
Jurong; GRC	Desmond **Lee**^{[XV]}		15 July 1976 (50 years, 125 days)	People's Action Party	
Jurong; GRC	David **Ong** Kim Huat	–	19 May 1961 (65 years, 182 days)	People's Action Party	
Jurong; GRC	**Tharman** Shanmugaratnam^{[XVI]}		22 January 1957 (69 years, 299 days)	People's Action Party	
Marine Parade; GRC	**Fatimah** Lateef	–	16 March 1966 (60 years, 246 days)	People's Action Party	
Marine Parade; GRC	**Goh** Chok Tong^{[XVII]}		20 May 1941 (85 years, 181 days)	People's Action Party	
Marine Parade; GRC	**Seah** Kian Peng^{[XVIII]}		5 December 1961 (64 years, 347 days)	People's Action Party	
Marine Parade; GRC	**Tan** Chuan-Jin^{[XIX]}	–	10 January 1969 (57 years, 311 days)	People's Action Party	
Marine Parade; GRC	**Tin** Pei Ling	–	23 December 1983 (42 years, 329 days)	People's Action Party	
Moulmein–Kallang; GRC	**Lui** Tuck Yew^{[XX]}		16 August 1961 (65 years, 93 days)	People's Action Party	
Moulmein–Kallang; GRC	Denise **Phua** Lay Peng^{[XXI]}	–	9 December 1959 (66 years, 343 days)	People's Action Party	
Moulmein–Kallang; GRC	Edwin **Tong** Chun Fai		12 August 1969 (57 years, 97 days)	People's Action Party	
Moulmein–Kallang; GRC	**Yaacob** Ibrahim^{[XXII]}		3 October 1955 (71 years, 45 days)	People's Action Party	
Mountbatten SMC	**Lim** Biow Chuan	–	22 May 1963 (63 years, 179 days)	People's Action Party	
Nee Soon; GRC	**Lee** Bee Wah		6 October 1960 (66 years, 42 days)	People's Action Party	
Nee Soon; GRC	**Lim** Wee Kiak	–	27 December 1968 (57 years, 325 days)	People's Action Party	
Nee Soon; GRC	**Muhammad Faishal** Ibrahim^{[XXIII]}	–	16 June 1968 (58 years, 154 days)	People's Action Party	
Nee Soon; GRC	K. **Shanmugam**^{[XXIV]}		26 March 1959 (67 years, 236 days)	People's Action Party	
Nee Soon; GRC	Patrick **Tay** Teck Guan	–	1 December 1971 (54 years, 351 days)	People's Action Party	
Pasir Ris–Punggol; GRC	**Gan** Thiam Poh	–	23 October 1963 (63 years, 25 days)	People's Action Party	
Pasir Ris–Punggol; GRC	Janil **Puthucheary**	–	6 November 1972 (54 years, 11 days)	People's Action Party	
Pasir Ris–Punggol; GRC	Penny **Low**		12 June 1967 (59 years, 158 days)	People's Action Party	
Pasir Ris–Punggol; GRC	**Teo** Chee Hean^{[XXV]}		27 December 1954 (71 years, 325 days)	People's Action Party	
Pasir Ris–Punggol; GRC	**Teo** Ser Luck^{[XXVI]}		8 June 1968 (58 years, 162 days)	People's Action Party	
Pasir Ris–Punggol; GRC	**Zainal** bin Sapari		30 November 1965 (60 years, 352 days)	People's Action Party	
Pioneer SMC	Cedric **Foo** Chee Keng	–	16 July 1960 (66 years, 124 days)	People's Action Party	
Potong Pasir SMC	**Sitoh** Yih Pin	–	2 December 1963 (62 years, 350 days)	People's Action Party	
Punggol East SMC	**Lee** Li Lian ^{B}	–	19 July 1978 (48 years, 121 days)	Workers' Party	
Radin Mas SMC	Sam **Tan** Chin Siong^{[XXVII]}		13 October 1958 (68 years, 35 days)	People's Action Party	
Sembawang; GRC	**Hawazi** Daipi^{[XXVIII]}	–	13 February 1954 (72 years, 277 days)	People's Action Party	
Sembawang; GRC	**Khaw** Boon Wan^{[XXIX]}		8 December 1952 (73 years, 344 days)	People's Action Party	
Sembawang; GRC	Ellen **Lee**	–	13 April 1957 (69 years, 218 days)	People's Action Party	
Sembawang; GRC	**Ong** Teng Koon	–	13 January 1977 (49 years, 308 days)	People's Action Party	
Sembawang; GRC	Vikram **Nair**	–	18 July 1978 (48 years, 122 days)	People's Action Party	
Sengkang West SMC	**Lam** Pin Min^{[XXX]}		13 October 1958 (68 years, 35 days)	People's Action Party	
Tampines; GRC	**Baey** Yam Keng		31 August 1970 (56 years, 78 days)	People's Action Party	
Tampines; GRC	**Heng** Swee Keat^{[XXXI]}		1961 (64–65 years)	People's Action Party	
Tampines; GRC	**Mah** Bow Tan		12 September 1948 (78 years, 66 days)	People's Action Party	
Tampines; GRC	**Masagos Zulkifli** bin Masagos Mohamad^{[XXXII]}		16 April 1963 (63 years, 215 days)	People's Action Party	
Tampines; GRC	Irene **Ng** Phek Hoong	–	24 December 1963 (62 years, 328 days)	People's Action Party	
Tanjong Pagar; GRC	**Chan** Chun Sing^{[XXXIII]}		9 October 1969 (57 years, 39 days)	People's Action Party	
Tanjong Pagar; GRC	**Chia Shi-Lu**	–	13 October 1971 (55 years, 35 days)	People's Action Party	
Tanjong Pagar; GRC	**Indranee** Rajah^{[XXXIV]}		12 April 1963 (63 years, 219 days)	People's Action Party	
Tanjong Pagar; GRC	Lily **Neo**	–	12 August 1953 (73 years, 97 days)	People's Action Party	
West Coast; GRC	Arthur **Fong**	–	24 May 1964 (62 years, 177 days)	People's Action Party	
West Coast; GRC	**Foo** Mee Har	–	10 January 1966 (60 years, 311 days)	People's Action Party	
West Coast; GRC	S. **Iswaran**^{[XXXV]}		14 June 1962 (64 years, 156 days)	People's Action Party	
West Coast; GRC	**Lim** Hng Kiang^{[XXXVI]}		9 April 1954 (72 years, 222 days)	People's Action Party	
West Coast; GRC	Lawrence **Wong**^{[XXXVII]}		18 December 1972 (53 years, 334 days)	People's Action Party	
Whampoa SMC	**Heng** Chee How^{[XXXVIII]}	–	14 July 1961 (65 years, 126 days)	People's Action Party	
Yuhua SMC	Grace **Fu** Hai Yien^{[XXXIX]}		29 March 1964 (62 years, 233 days)	People's Action Party	

The names in bold (sorted according to alphabetical order) are the individuals' surnames, except for Indian and Malay persons, where personal names are indicated.
^APng Eng Huat was elected following the Hougang by-election in 2012.
^BLee Li Lian was elected following the Punggol East by-election in 2013.

Designations and titles

^{I} Lee Hsien Loong is also the Prime Minister.
^{II} Ng Eng Hen is also the Minister for Defence and the Leader of the House.
^{III} Josephine Teo is also the Senior Minister of State for the Ministry of Finance and the Ministry of Transport.
^{IV} Teo Ho Pin is also Mayor of North West District and the Deputy Government Whip.
^{V} Gan Kim Yong is also the Minister for Health and the Government Whip.
^{VI} Low Yen Ling is also the Parliamentary Secretary for the Ministry of Social and Family Development and the Ministry of Culture, Community and Youth, as well as Mayor of South West District.
^{VII} Lee Yi Shyan is also the Senior Minister of State for the Ministry of Trade and Industry and the Ministry of National Development.
^{VIII} Lim Swee Say is also the Minister for Manpower.
^{IX} Maliki is also the Minister of State for the Ministry of National Development and the Ministry of Defence, and Mayor of South East District.
^{X} Sim Ann is also the Minister of State for the Ministry of Education and the Ministry of Communications and Information.
^{XI} Vivian is also the Minister for the Environment and Water Resources.
^{XII} Amy Khor is also the Senior Minister of State for the Ministry of Health and the Ministry of Manpower, as well as the Deputy Government Whip.
^{XIII} Charles Chong is also the Deputy Speaker of Parliament.
^{XIV} Halimah is also the Speaker of Parliament.
^{XV} Desmond Lee is also the Minister of State for the Ministry of National Development.
^{XVI} Tharman is also the Deputy Prime Minister and the Minister for Finance.
^{XVII} Goh Chok Tong is conferred the title of Emeritus Senior Minister.
^{XVIII} Seah Kian Peng is also the Deputy Speaker of Parliament.
^{XIX} Tan Chuan-Jin is also the Minister for Social and Family Development.
^{XX} Lui Tuck Yew is also the Minister for Transport and the Second Minister for Defence.
^{XXI} Denise Phua is also Mayor of Central Singapore District.
^{XXII} Yaacob is also the Minister for Communications and Information and the Minister-in-charge of Muslim Affairs.
^{XXIII} Faishal is also the Parliamentary Secretary for the Ministry of Health and the Ministry of Transport.
^{XXIV} Shanmugam is also the Minister for Foreign Affairs and the Minister of Law.
^{XXV} Teo Chee Hean is also the Deputy Prime Minister, the Coordinating Minister for National Security and the Minister for Home Affairs.
^{XXVI} Teo Ser Luck is also the Minister of State for the Ministry of Trade and Industry and Mayor of North East District.
^{XXVII} Sam Tan is also the Minister of State in the Prime Minister's Office and the Ministry of Culture, Community and Youth.
^{XXVIII} Hawazi is also the Senior Parliamentary Secretary for the Ministry of Education and the Ministry of Manpower.
^{XXIX} Khaw Boon Wan is also the Minister for National Development.
^{XXX} Lam Pin Min is also the Minister of State for the Ministry of Health.
^{XXXI} Heng Swee Keat is also the Minister for Education.
^{XXXII} Masagos is also the Minister in the Prime Minister's Office, Second Minister for Home Affairs and Second Minister for Foreign Affairs.
^{XXXIII} Chan Chun Sing is also the Minister in the Prime Minister's Office.
^{XXXIV} Indranee is also the Senior Minister of State for the Ministry of Law and the Ministry of Education.
^{XXXV} Iswaran is also the Minister in the Prime Minister’s Office, Second Minister for Home Affairs and Second Minister for Trade and Industry.
^{XXXVI} Lim Hng Kiang is also the Minister for Trade and Industry.
^{XXXVII} Lawrence Wong is also the Minister for Culture, Community and Youth and Second Minister for Communications and Information.
^{XXXVIII} Heng Chee How is also the Senior Minister of State in the Prime Minister’s Office and the Deputy Leader of the House.
^{XXXIX} Grace Fu is also the Minister in the Prime Minister’s Office, Minister-in-charge of the Municipal Services Office, Second Minister for the Environment and Water Resources and Second Minister for Foreign Affairs.

== Non-constituency Members of Parliament ==
Name	Portrait	Date of birth (Age)	Party	Ref
Gerald **Giam** Yean Song		22 November 1977 (48 years, 360 days)	Workers' Party	
Lina **Chiam** née **Loh**	–	6 April 1949 (77 years, 225 days)	Singapore People's Party	
**Yee** Jenn Jong	–	24 March 1965 (61 years, 238 days)	Workers' Party	

The names in bold (sorted according to alphabetical order) are the individuals' surnames.

== Nominated Members of Parliament ==
Name	Date of birth (Age)	Ref
**Chia** Yong Yong	10 October 1962 (64 years, 38 days)	
Thomas **Chua** Kee Seng	1 November 1954 (72 years, 16 days)	
K. **Karthikeyan**	8 August 1959 (67 years, 101 days)	
**Kuik** Shiao-Yin	6 October 1977 (49 years, 42 days)	
**Mohd Ismail** Hussein	21 March 1963 (63 years, 241 days)	
Rita **Soh** Siow Lan	11 March 1959 (67 years, 251 days)	
Benedict **Tan**	21 November 1967 (58 years, 361 days)	
Randolph **Tan**	16 August 1964 (62 years, 93 days)	
**Tan** Tai Yong	3 February 1961 (65 years, 287 days)	

The names in bold (sorted according to alphabetical order) are the individuals' surnames, except for Indian and Malay persons, where personal names are indicated.

== See also ==
- 2011 Singaporean general election
- Constituencies of Singapore
- Parliament of Singapore
- Third Lee Hsien Loong Cabinet
- List of members of the 13th Parliament of Singapore
