= List of members of the 13th Parliament of Singapore =

Singapore's current electoral map indicating party of MP representing each constituency. People's Action Party Worker's Party

The 13th Parliament of Singapore was a meeting of the legislature of Singapore. The Parliament is unicameral – all Members of Parliament (MPs) make up a single chamber, and there is no senate or upper house. The Constitution of Singapore states that the Parliament of Singapore shall consist of eighty-nine members who are elected by the people, up to nine Non-constituency Members of Parliament (NCMPs) and up to nine Nominated Members of Parliament (NMPs), following changes to the Constitution enacted on 26 April 2010. After the 2015 general election, 89 MPs were elected and three NCMPs were appointed (or, in the terms of the Parliamentary Elections Act, declared elected) to Parliament. However, Lee Li Lian had decided not to accept the NCMP post, which Parliament would later resolve whether or not to fill the vacated seat.

== Elected Members of Parliament ==
Key
- Denotes Group Representation Constituencies (GRCs)
- Denotes Single Member Constituencies (SMCs)
- Denotes the Speaker of Parliament
- Denotes Cabinet members

| Constituency | Party | Name | Portrait | Date of birth (Age) | Ref |
|---|---|---|---|---|---|
| Aljunied; GRC | WP | **Chen** Show Mao | | 6 February 1961 (65 years, 285 days) | |
| Aljunied; GRC | WP | Sylvia **Lim** | | 28 March 1965 (61 years, 235 days) | |
| Aljunied; GRC | WP | **Low** Thia Khiang | | 5 September 1956 (70 years, 74 days) | |
| Aljunied; GRC | WP | **Muhamad Faisal** bin Abdul Manap | – | 6 June 1975 (51 years, 165 days) | |
| Aljunied; GRC | WP | **Pritam** Singh | | 2 August 1976 (50 years, 108 days) | |
| Ang Mo Kio; GRC | PAP | **Ang** Hin Kee | – | 22 October 1965 (61 years, 27 days) | |
| Ang Mo Kio; GRC | PAP | Darryl **David** | – | 19 October 1970 (56 years, 30 days) | |
| Ang Mo Kio; GRC | PAP | **Gan** Thiam Poh | – | 23 October 1963 (63 years, 26 days) | |
| Ang Mo Kio; GRC | PAP | **Intan Azura** binte Mokhtar | – | 27 June 1976 (50 years, 144 days) | |
| Ang Mo Kio; GRC | PAP | **Koh** Poh Koon^{[I]} | – | 16 March 1972 (54 years, 247 days) | |
| Ang Mo Kio; GRC | PAP | **Lee** Hsien Loong^{[II]} | | 10 February 1952 (74 years, 281 days) | |
| Bishan–Toa Payoh; GRC | PAP | **Chee** Hong Tat^{[III]} | – | 4 November 1973 (53 years, 14 days) | |
| Bishan–Toa Payoh; GRC | PAP | **Chong** Kee Hiong | – | 1966 (59–60 years) | |
| Bishan–Toa Payoh; GRC | PAP | **Ng** Eng Hen^{[IV]} | | 10 December 1958 (67 years, 343 days) | |
| Bishan–Toa Payoh; GRC | PAP | **Saktiandi** Supaat | – | 28 October 1973 (53 years, 21 days) | |
| Bishan–Toa Payoh; GRC | PAP | Josephine **Teo** Li Min^{[V]} | | 8 July 1968 (58 years, 133 days) | |
| Bukit Batok SMC | PAP | K. **Muralidharan** Pillai | | 30 October 1967 (59 years, 19 days) | |
| Bukit Panjang SMC | PAP | **Teo** Ho Pin^{[VI]} | – | 19 January 1960 (66 years, 303 days) | |
| Chua Chu Kang; GRC | PAP | **Gan** Kim Yong^{[VII]} | | 9 February 1959 (67 years, 282 days) | |
| Chua Chu Kang; GRC | PAP | **Low** Yen Ling^{[VIII]} | – | 17 August 1974 (52 years, 93 days) | |
| Chua Chu Kang; GRC | PAP | **Yee** Chia Hsing | – | 1971 (54–55 years) | |
| Chua Chu Kang; GRC | PAP | **Zaqy** Mohamad^{[IX]} | – | 15 September 1974 (52 years, 64 days) | |
| East Coast; GRC | PAP | **Lee** Yi Shyan | – | 9 March 1962 (64 years, 254 days) | |
| East Coast; GRC | PAP | **Lim** Swee Say | | 13 July 1954 (72 years, 128 days) | |
| East Coast; GRC | PAP | **Mohamad Maliki** bin Osman^{[X]} | | 19 July 1965 (61 years, 122 days) | |
| East Coast; GRC | PAP | Jessica **Tan** Soon Neo | – | 28 May 1966 (60 years, 174 days) | |
| Fengshan SMC | PAP | Cheryl **Chan** Wei Ling | | 1976 (49–50 years) | |
| Holland–Bukit Timah; GRC | PAP | Christopher **de Souza** | | 21 January 1976 (50 years, 301 days) | |
| Holland–Bukit Timah; GRC | PAP | **Liang** Eng Hwa | – | 20 March 1964 (62 years, 243 days) | |
| Holland–Bukit Timah; GRC | PAP | **Sim** Ann^{[XI]} | | 12 March 1975 (51 years, 251 days) | |
| Holland–Bukit Timah; GRC | PAP | **Vivian** Balakrishnan^{[XII]} | | 25 January 1961 (65 years, 297 days) | |
| Hong Kah North SMC | PAP | Amy **Khor** Lean Suan^{[XIII]} | – | 23 February 1958 (68 years, 268 days) | |
| Hougang SMC | WP | **Png** Eng Huat | | 9 December 1961 (64 years, 344 days) | |
| Jalan Besar; GRC | PAP | **Heng** Chee How^{[XIV]} | – | 14 July 1961 (65 years, 127 days) | |
| Jalan Besar; GRC | PAP | Lily **Neo** | – | 12 August 1953 (73 years, 98 days) | |
| Jalan Besar; GRC | PAP | Denise **Phua** Lay Peng^{[XV]} | – | 9 December 1959 (66 years, 344 days) | |
| Jalan Besar; GRC | PAP | **Yaacob** Ibrahim | | 3 October 1955 (71 years, 46 days) | |
| Jurong; GRC | PAP | **Ang** Wei Neng | – | 31 March 1967 (59 years, 232 days) | |
| Jurong; GRC | PAP | Desmond **Lee**^{[XVI]} | | 15 July 1976 (50 years, 126 days) | |
| Jurong; GRC | PAP | **Rahayu** Mahzam | | 21 July 1980 (46 years, 120 days) | |
| Jurong; GRC | PAP | **Tan** Wu Meng^{[XVII]} | – | 1975 (50–51 years) | |
| Jurong; GRC | PAP | **Tharman** Shanmugaratnam^{[XVIII]} | | 22 January 1957 (69 years, 300 days) | |
| MacPherson SMC | PAP | **Tin** Pei Ling | – | 23 December 1983 (42 years, 330 days) | |
| Marine Parade; GRC | PAP | **Fatimah** Lateef | – | 16 March 1966 (60 years, 247 days) | |
| Marine Parade; GRC | PAP | **Goh** Chok Tong^{[XIX]} | | 20 May 1941 (85 years, 182 days) | |
| Marine Parade; GRC | PAP | **Seah** Kian Peng | | 5 December 1961 (64 years, 348 days) | |
| Marine Parade; GRC | PAP | **Tan** Chuan-Jin | – | 10 January 1969 (57 years, 312 days) | |
| Marine Parade; GRC | PAP | Edwin **Tong** Chun Fai^{[XX]} | | 12 August 1969 (57 years, 98 days) | |
| Marsiling–Yew Tee; GRC | PAP | Seat Vacant | | | |
| Marsiling–Yew Tee; GRC | PAP | **Ong** Teng Koon | – | 13 January 1977 (49 years, 309 days) | |
| Marsiling–Yew Tee; GRC | PAP | Lawrence **Wong**^{[XXI]} | | 18 December 1972 (53 years, 335 days) | |
| Marsiling–Yew Tee; GRC | PAP | Alex **Yam** Ziming | – | 20 June 1981 (45 years, 151 days) | |
| Mountbatten SMC | PAP | **Lim** Biow Chuan^{[XXII]} | – | 22 May 1963 (63 years, 180 days) | |
| Nee Soon; GRC | PAP | **Kwek** Hian Chuan Henry | | 20 April 1976 (50 years, 212 days) | |
| Nee Soon; GRC | PAP | **Lee** Bee Wah | | 6 October 1960 (66 years, 43 days) | |
| Nee Soon; GRC | PAP | **Muhammad Faishal** Ibrahim^{[XXIII]} | – | 16 June 1968 (58 years, 155 days) | |
| Nee Soon; GRC | PAP | Louis **Ng** Kok Kwang | – | 8 December 1978 (47 years, 345 days) | |
| Nee Soon; GRC | PAP | K. **Shanmugam**^{[XXIV]} | | 26 March 1959 (67 years, 237 days) | |
| Pasir Ris–Punggol; GRC | PAP | Janil **Puthucheary**^{[XXV]} | – | 6 November 1972 (54 years, 12 days) | |
| Pasir Ris–Punggol; GRC | PAP | **Sun** Xueling^{[XXVI]} | – | 10 July 1979 (47 years, 131 days) | |
| Pasir Ris–Punggol; GRC | PAP | **Teo** Chee Hean^{[XXVII]} | | 27 December 1954 (71 years, 326 days) | |
| Pasir Ris–Punggol; GRC | PAP | **Ng** Chee Meng^{[XXVIII]} | | 8 August 1968 (58 years, 102 days) | |
| Pasir Ris–Punggol; GRC | PAP | **Teo** Ser Luck | | 8 June 1968 (58 years, 163 days) | |
| Pasir Ris–Punggol; GRC | PAP | **Zainal** bin Sapari | | 30 November 1965 (60 years, 353 days) | |
| Pioneer SMC | PAP | Cedric **Foo** Chee Keng | – | 16 July 1960 (66 years, 125 days) | |
| Potong Pasir SMC | PAP | **Sitoh** Yih Pin | – | 2 December 1963 (62 years, 351 days) | |
| Punggol East SMC | PAP | Charles **Chong**^{[XXIX]} | – | 24 June 1953 (73 years, 147 days) | |
| Radin Mas SMC | PAP | Sam **Tan** Chin Siong^{[XXX]} | | 13 October 1958 (68 years, 36 days) | |
| Sembawang; GRC | PAP | **Amrin** Amin^{[XXXI]} | – | 1978 (47–48 years) | |
| Sembawang; GRC | PAP | **Khaw** Boon Wan^{[XXXII]} | | 8 December 1952 (73 years, 345 days) | |
| Sembawang; GRC | PAP | **Lim** Wee Kiak | – | 27 December 1968 (57 years, 326 days) | |
| Sembawang; GRC | PAP | Vikram **Nair** | – | 18 July 1978 (48 years, 123 days) | |
| Sembawang; GRC | PAP | **Ong** Ye Kung^{[XXXIII]} | | 15 November 1969 (57 years, 3 days) | |
| Sengkang West SMC | PAP | **Lam** Pin Min^{[XXXIV]} | | 13 October 1958 (68 years, 36 days) | |
| Tampines; GRC | PAP | **Baey** Yam Keng^{[XXXV]} | | 31 August 1970 (56 years, 79 days) | |
| Tampines; GRC | PAP | **Cheng** Li Hui | – | 1976 (49–50 years) | |
| Tampines; GRC | PAP | Desmond **Choo** Pey Ching^{[XXXVI]} | – | 1978 (47–48 years) | |
| Tampines; GRC | PAP | **Heng** Swee Keat^{[XXXVII]} | | 1 November 1961 (65 years, 17 days) | |
| Tampines; GRC | PAP | **Masagos Zulkifli** bin Masagos Mohamad^{[XXXVIII]} | | 16 April 1963 (63 years, 216 days) | |
| Tanjong Pagar; GRC | PAP | **Chan** Chun Sing^{[XXXIX]} | | 9 October 1969 (57 years, 40 days) | |
| Tanjong Pagar; GRC | PAP | **Chia** Shi-Lu | – | 13 October 1971 (55 years, 36 days) | |
| Tanjong Pagar; GRC | PAP | **Indranee** Rajah^{[XL]} | | 12 April 1963 (63 years, 220 days) | |
| Tanjong Pagar; GRC | PAP | Joan **Pereira** | – | 1967 (58–59 years) | |
| Tanjong Pagar; GRC | PAP | Melvin **Yong** Yik Chye | | 19 February 1972 (54 years, 272 days) | |
| West Coast; GRC | PAP | **Foo** Mee Har | – | 10 January 1966 (60 years, 312 days) | |
| West Coast; GRC | PAP | S. **Iswaran**^{[XLI]} | | 14 June 1962 (64 years, 157 days) | |
| West Coast; GRC | PAP | **Lim** Hng Kiang | | 9 April 1954 (72 years, 223 days) | |
| West Coast; GRC | PAP | Patrick **Tay** Teck Guan | – | 1 December 1971 (54 years, 352 days) | |
| Yuhua SMC | PAP | Grace **Fu** Hai Yien^{[XLII]} | | 29 March 1964 (62 years, 234 days) | |

The names in bold (sorted according to alphabetical order) are the individuals' surnames, except for Indian and Malay persons, where personal names are indicated.

Designations and titles

^{I} Koh Poh Koon is also Senior Minister of State in the Ministry of Trade and Industry.
^{II} Lee Hsien Loong is also the Prime Minister.
^{III} Chee Hong Tat is also Senior Minister of State in the Ministry of Trade and Industry and the Ministry of Education.
^{IV} Ng Eng Hen is also the Minister for Defence.
^{V} Josephine Teo is also the Minister for Manpower and the Second Minister for Home Affairs.
^{VI} Teo Ho Pin is also Mayor of the North West District.
^{VII} Gan Kim Yong is also the Minister for Health.
^{VIII} Low Yen Ling is also Senior Parliamentary Secretary in the Ministry of Manpower and the Ministry of Education, as well as Mayor of the South West District.
^{IX} Zaqy Mohamad is also Minister of State in the Ministry of National Development and the Ministry of Manpower.
^{X} Maliki Osman is also Senior Minister of State in the Ministry of Defence and the Ministry of Foreign Affairs, as well as Mayor of the South East District.
^{XI} Sim Ann is also Senior Minister of State in the Ministry of Communications and Information and the Ministry of Culture, Community and Youth, as well as the Deputy Government Whip.
^{XII} Vivian Balakrishnan is also the Minister for Foreign Affairs and the Minister-in-charge of Smart Nation.
^{XIII} Amy Khor is also Senior Minister of State in the Ministry of Health and the Ministry of the Environment and Water Resources.
^{XIV} Heng Chee How is also Senior Minister of State in the Ministry of Defence.
^{XV} Denise Phua is also Mayor of the Central Singapore District.
^{XVI} Desmond Lee is also the Minister for Social and Family Development and the Second Minister for National Development, as well as the Deputy Leader of the House.
^{XVII} Tan Wu Meng is also Senior Parliamentary Secretary in the Ministry of Foreign Affairs and the Ministry of Trade and Industry.
^{XVIII} Tharman Shanmugaratnam is also the Deputy Prime Minister and the Coordinating Minister for Economic and Social Policies.
^{XIX} Goh Chok Tong is conferred the title of Emeritus Senior Minister.
^{XX} Edwin Tong is also Senior Minister of State in the Ministry of Health and the Ministry of the Environment and Water Resources.
^{XXI} Lawrence Wong is also the Minister for National Development and the Second Minister for Finance.
^{XXII} Lim Biow Chuan is also the Deputy Speaker of Parliament.
^{XXIII} Faishal Ibrahim is also Senior Parliamentary Secretary in the Ministry of Education and the Ministry of Social and Family Development.
^{XXIV} K Shanmugam is also the Minister for Home Affairs and the Minister for Law.
^{XXV} Janil Puthucheary is also Senior Minister of State in the Ministry of Communications and Information and the Ministry of Transport.
^{XXVI} Sun Xueling is also Senior Parliamentary Secretary in the Ministry of Home Affairs and the Ministry of National Development.
^{XXVII} Teo Chee Hean is also the Deputy Prime Minister and the Coordinating Minister for National Security.
^{XXVIII} Ng Chee Meng is also Minister in the Prime Minister's Office.
^{XXIX} Charles Chong is also the Deputy Speaker of Parliament.
^{XXX} Sam Tan is also Minister of State in the Ministry of Social and Family Development and the Ministry of Foreign Affairs, as well as the Deputy Government Whip.
^{XXXI} Amrin Amin is also Senior Parliamentary Secretary in the Ministry of Home Affairs and the Ministry of Health.
^{XXXII} Khaw Boon Wan is also the Coordinating Minister for Infrastructure and the Minister for Transport.
^{XXXIII} Ong Ye Kung is also the Minister for Education.
^{XXXIV} Lam Pin Min is also Senior Minister of State in the Ministry of Health and the Ministry of Transport.
^{XXXV} Baey Yam Keng is also Senior Parliamentary Secretary in the Ministry of Transport and the Ministry of Culture, Community and Youth.
^{XXXVI} Desmond Choo is also Mayor of the North East District.
^{XXXVII} Heng Swee Keat is also the Minister for Finance.
^{XXXVIII} Masagos Zulkifli is also the Minister for the Environment and Water Resources and the Minister-in-charge of Muslim Affairs.
^{XXXIX} Chan Chun Sing is also the Minister for Trade and Industry and the Minister-in-charge of the Public Service Division, as well as the Government Whip.
^{XL} Indranee Rajah is also Minister in the Prime Minister's Office, the Second Minister for Finance and the Second Minister for Education.
^{XLI} S Iswaran is also the Minister for Communications and Information and the Minister-in-charge of Trade Relations in the Ministry of Trade and Industry.
^{XLII} Grace Fu is also the Minister for Culture, Community and Youth and the Minister-in-charge of the Municipal Services Office, as well as the Leader of the House.

== Non-constituency Members of Parliament ==
| Name | Portrait | Date of birth (Age) | Party | Ref |
|---|---|---|---|---|
| Daniel **Goh** Pei Siong ^{A} | – | 1973 (52–53 years) | Workers' Party | |
| Leon **Perera** | – | 1970 (55–56 years) | Workers' Party | |
| Dennis **Tan** Lip Fong | – | 31 August 1970 (56 years, 79 days) | Workers' Party | |

The names in bold (sorted according to alphabetical order) are the individuals' surnames.
^ADaniel Goh was separately elected as an NCMP on 4 February 2016.

== Nominated Members of Parliament ==
The first table reflected consists of nine nominated members listed below were presented the instruments of appointment on 22 March 2016 and subsequently sworn in on 24 March 2016.

| Name | Date of birth (Age) | Ref |
|---|---|---|
| **Azmoon** Ahmad | 1962 (63–64 years) | |
| **Chia** Yong Yong | 10 October 1962 (64 years, 39 days) | |
| Thomas **Chua** Kee Seng | 1 November 1954 (72 years, 17 days) | |
| **Ganesh** Rajaram | 1967 (58–59 years) | |
| **Kok** Heng Leun | 1966 (59–60 years) | |
| **Kuik** Shiao-Yin | 6 October 1977 (49 years, 43 days) | |
| Mahdev **Mohan** | 1979 (46–47 years) | |
| Randolph **Tan** | 16 August 1964 (62 years, 94 days) | |
| K. **Thanaletchimi** | 1966 (59–60 years) | |

The names in bold (sorted according to alphabetical order) are the individuals' surnames, except for Indian and Malay persons, where personal names are indicated.

The nominated members listed below were the second batch of members who presented the instruments of appointment on 26 September 2018 and subsequently sworn in on 1 October 2018.

| Name | Date of birth (Age) | Ref |
|---|---|---|
| **Mohamed Irshad** | 1989 (36–37 years) | |
| **Arasu** Duraisamy | 1968 (57–58 years) | |
| Douglas **Foo** Peow Yong | 1969 (56–57 years) | |
| Terence **Ho** Wee San | 1969 (56–57 years) | |
| **Lim** Sun Sun | 1972 (53–54 years) | |
| Anthea **Ong** Lay Theng | 1968 (57–58 years) | |
| Irene **Quay** Siew Ching | 1975 (50–51 years) | |
| Walter Edgar **Theseira** | 1978 (47–48 years) | |
| **Yip** Pin Xiu | 10 January 1992 (34 years, 312 days) | |

The names in bold (sorted according to alphabetical order) are the individuals' surnames, except for Indian and Malay persons, where personal names are indicated.

== See also ==
- 2015 Singaporean general election
- Constituencies of Singapore
- Fourth Lee Hsien Loong Cabinet
- Parliament of Singapore
- Lists of members of parliament in Singapore
