= 13th Parliament of Singapore =

- Majority parliament
- 15 January 2016 – 23 June 2020 (4 years, 5 months and 8 days)

House
- Seating arrangements of the House
- Speaker of Parliament: Halimah Yacob 15 January 2016 – 7 August 2017; Charles Chong (Acting) 7 August 2017 – 11 September 2017; Tan Chuan-Jin 11 September 2017 – 23 June 2020
- Prime Minister: Lee Hsien Loong 15 January 2016 – 23 June 2020
- Leader of the Opposition: Low Thia Khiang 15 January 2016 – 8 April 2018; Pritam Singh 8 April 2018 – 23 June 2020

Session(s)

1st Session
- 15 January 2016 – 3 April 2018 (2 years, 2 months and 19 days)

2nd Session
- 7 May 2018 – 23 June 2020 (2 years, 1 month and 16 days)

Cabinet(s)

13th Cabinet
- Lee Hsien Loong; 1 October 2015 – 23 June 2020

Parliamentarians
Elected	NCMP	Nominated
88 (Note: 89 MPs were elected in the 2015 Singaporean general election. There is one vacant seat at dissolution.)	3	9
<12th	14th>

The 13th Parliament of Singapore was a meeting of the Parliament of Singapore. The first session commenced on 15 January 2016 and ran until 3 April 2018; the second session ran from 7 May 2018 until parliament was dissolved on 23 June 2020, with the final sitting held on 5 June. The membership was set by the 2015 Singapore General Election on 11 September 2015, and changed twice throughout the term; one was the resignation of Bukit Batok Single Member Constituency MP David Ong in 2016, and the resignation of Marsiling–Yew Tee Group Representation Constituency MP and Speaker Halimah Yacob in 2017.

The 13th Parliament is controlled by a People's Action Party majority, led by Prime Minister Lee Hsien Loong and members of the cabinet, which assumed power on 1 October 2015. The Opposition is led by the Secretary General of the Workers' Party, Pritam Singh. Tan Chuan-Jin, of the People's Action Party, is the Speaker of Parliament as of 11 September 2017. He succeeds Yacob, who resigned as Speaker to contest in the Presidential Elections 2017. Yacob was previously elected as the 9th Speaker of the House during the 12th Parliament on 14 January 2013.

It was the first parliament where only two parties represent the parliament for a full duration of term, and the third time where the situation occurred, following J. B. Jeyaretnam's by-election win in 1981 until 1984, and his vacation of his seat in 1986 until 1988. It was also the first Parliament without any members from either the pre-independence Legislative Assembly nor the inaugural Parliament, following the death of the last original MP Lee Kuan Yew prior to the formation of the Parliament.

== Result of the 2015 Singapore general election ==
Party	Votes	%	Seats	+/–
People's Action Party	1,579,183	69.86	83	+2
Workers' Party	282,143	12.48	9	0
Singapore Democratic Party	84,931	3.76	0	0
National Solidarity Party	79,826	3.53	0	0
Reform Party	59,517	2.63	0	0
Singaporeans First	50,867	2.25	0	New
Singapore People's Party	49,107	2.17	0	0
Singapore Democratic Alliance	46,550	2.06	0	0
People's Power Party	25,475	1.13	0	New
Independents	2,780	0.12	0	New
Total	2,260,379	100.00	92	+2
Valid votes	2,260,379	97.95		
Invalid/blank votes	47,367	2.05		
Total votes	2,307,746	100.00		
Registered voters/turnout	2,462,926	93.70		
Source: Singapore Elections

The Workers' Party, being the best performing opposition parties were awarded three Non-Constituency Member of Parliament seats in accordance with the Constitution. Lee Li Lian, Dennis Tan, and Leon Perera were appointed as NCMPs, though Lee Li Lian decided not to accept the NCMP post.

== Officeholders ==
=== Speaker ===
- Speaker:
  - Halimah Yacob (Marsiling–Yew Tee GRC, PAP), until 7 August 2017
  - Charles Chong (Punggol East SMC, PAP), acting: 7 August 11 – September 2017
  - Tan Chuan-Jin (Marine Parade GRC, PAP), from 11 September 2017
- Deputy Speaker:
  - Charles Chong (Punggol East SMC, PAP), from 25 January 2016
  - Lim Biow Chuan (Mountbatten SMC, PAP), from 25 January 2016)

=== Leaders ===
- Prime Minister: Lee Hsien Loong (Ang Mo Kio GRC, PAP)
- Leader of the Opposition:
  - Low Thia Khiang (Aljunied GRC, WP), until 8 April 2018
  - Pritam Singh (Aljunied GRC, WP), from 8 April 2018

=== House Leaders ===
- Leader of the House: Grace Fu (Yuhua SMC, PAP)
- Deputy Leader of the House: Desmond Lee (Jurong GRC, PAP)

=== Whips ===
- Government Party Whip: Janil Puthucheary (Pasir Ris–Punggol GRC, PAP)
- Deputy Government Party Whip:
  - Sim Ann (Holland–Bukit Timah GRC, PAP)
  - Zaqy Mohamad (Chua Chu Kang GRC, PAP)

== Members ==
Constituency	Division	Member	Party
Aljunied GRC	Bedok Reservoir–Punggol	Low Thia Khiang	Workers' Party
Aljunied GRC	Eunos	Pritam Singh	Workers' Party
Aljunied GRC	Kaki Bukit	Faisal Manap	Workers' Party
Aljunied GRC	Paya Lebar	Chen Show Mao	Workers' Party
Aljunied GRC	Serangoon	Sylvia Lim	Workers' Party
Ang Mo Kio GRC	Ang Mo Kio–Hougang	Darryl David	People's Action Party
Ang Mo Kio GRC	Cheng San–Seletar	Ang Hin Kee	People's Action Party
Ang Mo Kio GRC	Jalan Kayu	Intan Azura Mokhtar	People's Action Party
Ang Mo Kio GRC	Sengkang South	Gan Thiam Poh	People's Action Party
Ang Mo Kio GRC	Teck Ghee	Lee Hsien Loong	People's Action Party
Ang Mo Kio GRC	Yio Chu Kang	Koh Poh Koon	People's Action Party
Bishan–Toa Payoh GRC	Bishan East	Chong Kee Hiong	People's Action Party
Bishan–Toa Payoh GRC	Bishan North	Josephine Teo	People's Action Party
Bishan–Toa Payoh GRC	Toa Payoh Central	Ng Eng Hen	People's Action Party
Bishan–Toa Payoh GRC	Toa Payoh East	Saktiandi Supaat	People's Action Party
Bishan–Toa Payoh GRC	Toa Payoh West	Chee Hong Tat	People's Action Party
Bukit Batok SMC		David Ong (Note: David Ong resigned on 12 March 2016. Jurong GRC MP Desmond Lee acted as interim MP for Bukit Batok SMC from 12 March until 7 May 2016.)	People's Action Party
Bukit Batok SMC		Murali Pillai (Note: Murali Pillai was by-elected on 7 May 2016, to succeed David Ong.)	People's Action Party
Bukit Panjang SMC		Teo Ho Pin	People's Action Party
Chua Chu Kang GRC	Bukit Gombak	Low Yen Ling	People's Action Party
Chua Chu Kang GRC	Chua Chu Kang	Gan Kim Yong	People's Action Party
Chua Chu Kang GRC	Keat Hong	Zaqy Mohamad	People's Action Party
Chua Chu Kang GRC	Nanyang	Yee Chia Hsing	People's Action Party
East Coast GRC	Bedok	Lim Swee Say	People's Action Party
East Coast GRC	Changi–Simei	Jessica Tan	People's Action Party
East Coast GRC	Kampong Chai Chee	Lee Yi Shyan	People's Action Party
East Coast GRC	Siglap	Maliki Osman	People's Action Party
Fengshan SMC		Cheryl Chan	People's Action Party
Holland–Bukit Timah GRC	Bukit Timah	Sim Ann	People's Action Party
Holland–Bukit Timah GRC	Cashew	Vivian Balakrishnan	People's Action Party
Holland–Bukit Timah GRC	Ulu Pandan	Christopher de Souza	People's Action Party
Holland–Bukit Timah GRC	Zhenghua	Liang Eng Hwa	People's Action Party
Hong Kah North SMC		Amy Khor	People's Action Party
Hougang SMC		Png Eng Huat	Workers' Party
Jalan Besar GRC	Kampong Glam	Denise Phua	People's Action Party
Jalan Besar GRC	Kolam Ayer	Yaacob Ibrahim	People's Action Party
Jalan Besar GRC	Kreta Ayer–Kim Seng	Lily Neo	People's Action Party
Jalan Besar GRC	Whampoa	Heng Chee How	People's Action Party
Jurong GRC	Bukit Batok East	Rahayu Mahzam	People's Action Party
Jurong GRC	Clementi	Tan Wu Meng	People's Action Party
Jurong GRC	Jurong Central	Ang Wei Neng	People's Action Party
Jurong GRC	Jurong Spring	Desmond Lee	People's Action Party
Jurong GRC	Taman Jurong	Tharman Shanmugaratnam	People's Action Party
MacPherson SMC		Tin Pei Ling	People's Action Party
Marine Parade GRC	Braddell Heights	Seah Kian Peng	People's Action Party
Marine Parade GRC	Geylang Serai	Fatimah Lateef	People's Action Party
Marine Parade GRC	Joo Chiat	Edwin Tong	People's Action Party
Marine Parade GRC	Kembangan–Chai Chee	Tan Chuan-Jin	People's Action Party
Marine Parade GRC	Marine Parade	Goh Chok Tong	People's Action Party
Marsiling–Yew Tee GRC	Limbang	Lawrence Wong	People's Action Party
Marsiling–Yew Tee GRC	Marsiling	Halimah Yacob (Note: Halimah Yacob resigned on 7 August 2017, to run for President of Singapore. Chua Chu Kang GRC MP Zaqy Mohamad and the remaining MPs of Marsiling–Yew Tee GRC acted as interim MPs for Marsiling division.)	People's Action Party
Marsiling–Yew Tee GRC	Woodgrove	Ong Teng Koon	People's Action Party
Marsiling–Yew Tee GRC	Yew Tee	Alex Yam	People's Action Party
Mountbatten SMC		Lim Biow Chuan	People's Action Party
Nee Soon GRC	Chong Pang	K. Shanmugam	People's Action Party
Nee Soon GRC	Kebun Baru	Henry Kwek	People's Action Party
Nee Soon GRC	Nee Soon Central	Faishal Ibrahim	People's Action Party
Nee Soon GRC	Nee Soon East	Louis Ng	People's Action Party
Nee Soon GRC	Nee Soon South	Lee Bee Wah	People's Action Party
Pasir Ris–Punggol GRC	Pasir Ris East	Zainal Sapari	People's Action Party
Pasir Ris–Punggol GRC	Pasir Ris West	Teo Chee Hean	People's Action Party
Pasir Ris–Punggol GRC	Punggol Coast	Janil Puthucheary	People's Action Party
Pasir Ris–Punggol GRC	Punggol North	Ng Chee Meng	People's Action Party
Pasir Ris–Punggol GRC	Punggol West	Sun Xueling	People's Action Party
Pasir Ris–Punggol GRC	Sengkang Central	Teo Ser Luck	People's Action Party
Pioneer SMC		Cedric Foo	People's Action Party
Potong Pasir SMC		Sitoh Yih Pin	People's Action Party
Punggol East SMC		Charles Chong	People's Action Party
Radin Mas SMC		Sam Tan	People's Action Party
Sembawang GRC	Admiralty	Vikram Nair	People's Action Party
Sembawang GRC	Canberra	Lim Wee Kiak	People's Action Party
Sembawang GRC	Gambas	Ong Ye Kung	People's Action Party
Sembawang GRC	Sembawang	Khaw Boon Wan	People's Action Party
Sembawang GRC	Woodlands	Amrin Amin	People's Action Party
Sengkang West SMC		Lam Pin Min	People's Action Party
Tampines GRC	Tampines Central	Heng Swee Keat	People's Action Party
Tampines GRC	Tampines Changkat	Desmond Choo	People's Action Party
Tampines GRC	Tampines East	Cheng Li Hui	People's Action Party
Tampines GRC	Tampines North	Baey Yam Keng	People's Action Party
Tampines GRC	Tampines West	Masagos Zulkifli	People's Action Party
Tanjong Pagar GRC	Buona Vista	Chan Chun Sing	People's Action Party
Tanjong Pagar GRC	Henderson–Dawson	Joan Pereira	People's Action Party
Tanjong Pagar GRC	Moulmein–Cairnhill	Melvin Yong	People's Action Party
Tanjong Pagar GRC	Queenstown	Chia Shi-Lu	People's Action Party
Tanjong Pagar GRC	Tanjong Pagar–Tiong Bahru	Indranee Rajah	People's Action Party
West Coast GRC	Ayer Rajah	Foo Mee Har	People's Action Party
West Coast GRC	Boon Lay	Patrick Tay	People's Action Party
West Coast GRC	Telok Blangah	Lim Hng Kiang	People's Action Party
West Coast GRC	West Coast	S. Iswaran	People's Action Party
Yuhua SMC		Grace Fu	People's Action Party
Non-constituency Members of Parliament		Leon Perera	Workers' Party
Non-constituency Members of Parliament		Dennis Tan	Workers' Party
Non-constituency Members of Parliament		Daniel Goh (Note: Daniel Goh took office on 4 February 2016.)	Workers' Party
Nominated Members of Parliament		Azmoon Ahmad (Note: Served as Nominated Member of Parliament from 22 March 2016 until 21 September 2018.)	Nonpartisan
Nominated Members of Parliament		Chia Yong Yong	Nonpartisan
Nominated Members of Parliament		Thomas Chua	Nonpartisan
Nominated Members of Parliament		Ganesh Rajaram	Nonpartisan
Nominated Members of Parliament		Kok Heng Leun	Nonpartisan
Nominated Members of Parliament		Kuik Shiao-Yin	Nonpartisan
Nominated Members of Parliament		Mahdev Mohan	Nonpartisan
Nominated Members of Parliament		Randolph Tan	Nonpartisan
Nominated Members of Parliament		K. Thanaletchimi	Nonpartisan
Nominated Members of Parliament		Arasu Duraisamy (Note: Served as Nominated Member of Parliament from 22 September 2018.)	Nonpartisan
Nominated Members of Parliament		Douglas Foo	Nonpartisan
Nominated Members of Parliament		Ho Wee San	Nonpartisan
Nominated Members of Parliament		Mohamed Irshad	Nonpartisan
Nominated Members of Parliament		Lim Sun Sun	Nonpartisan
Nominated Members of Parliament		Anthea Ong	Nonpartisan
Nominated Members of Parliament		Irene Quay	Nonpartisan
Nominated Members of Parliament		Walter Theseira	Nonpartisan
Nominated Members of Parliament		Yip Pin Xiu	Nonpartisan

== Committees ==
=== Select committees ===
==== Committee of selection ====
Chaired by Speaker of Parliament Tan Chuan-Jin, the committee of selection selects and nominates members to the various sessional and select committees. The committee consisted of seven other members:

- Chan Chun Sing
- Cedric Foo
- Grace Fu
- Indranee Rajah
- Masagos Zulkifli
- Ong Ye Kung
- Pritam Singh

==== Committee of privileges ====
The committee of privileges looks into any complaint alleging breaches of parliamentary privilege. Chaired by Speaker of Parliament Tan Chuan-Jin, the committee consisted of seven other members:

- Chen Show Mao
- Grace Fu
- Indranee Rajah
- Maliki Osman
- Seah Kian Peng
- K. Shanmugam
- Edwin Tong

==== Estimates committee ====
The estimates committee examines the Government's budget and reports what economies, improvements in organisation, efficiency or administrative reforms consistent with the policy underlying the estimates, may be effected and suggests the form in which the estimates shall be presented to Parliament. The committee consisted of eight members:

- Foo Mee Har (Chairperson)
- Chia Shi-Lu
- Cheng Li Hui
- Darryl David
- Christopher de Souza
- Daniel Goh
- Lee Yi Shyan
- Alex Yam

==== House committee ====
The house committee looks after the comfort and convenience of Members of Parliament and advises the Speaker on these matters. Chaired by Speaker of Parliament Tan Chuan-Jin, the committee consisted of seven other members:

- Amrin Amin
- Gan Thiam Poh
- Henry Kwek
- Low Yen Ling
- Faisal Manap
- Sun Xueling
- Yee Chia Hsing

==== Public accounts committee ====
The public accounts committee examines various accounts of the Government showing the appropriation of funds granted by Parliament to meet public expenditure, as well as other accounts laid before Parliament. The committee consisted of eight members:

- Jessica Tan (Chairperson)
- Ang Hin Kee
- Ang Wei Neng
- Liang Eng Hwa
- Lim Wee Kiak
- Leon Perera
- Tin Pei Ling
- Zainal Sapari

==== Public petitions committee ====
The public petitions committee deals with public petitions received by the House. Its function is to consider petitions referred to the Committee and to report to the House. Chaired by Speaker of Parliament Tan Chuan-Jin, the committee consisted of seven other members:

- Cheryl Chan
- Janil Puthucheary
- Desmond Lee
- Louis Ng
- Denise Phua
- Dennis Tan
- Melvin Yong

==== Standing orders committee ====
The standing orders committee reviews the Standing Orders from time to time and recommends amendments and reports to the House on all matters relating to them. Chaired by Speaker of Parliament Tan Chuan-Jin, the committee consisted of nine other members:

- Charles Chong (Deputy Speaker)
- Lim Biow Chuan (Deputy Speaker)
- Chan Chun Sing
- Desmond Choo
- Grace Fu
- Joan Pereira
- Png Eng Huat
- Rahayu Mahzam
- Patrick Tay

=== Government Parliamentary Committees ===
Mooted by then-Prime Minister Goh Chok Tong in 1987, government parliamentary committees (GPCs) are set up by the governing People's Action Party to scrutinise the legislation and programmes of the various Ministries. They also serve as an additional channel of feedback on government policies.

Current members of the Government Parliamentary Committees as of 4 May 2018
Government Parliamentary Committee	Member of Parliament
Communications and Information
Chairperson	Cedric Foo
Deputy Chairperson	Tin Pei Ling
Members	Darryl David; Ong Teng Koon; Rahayu Mahzam; Teo Ho Pin; Teo Ser Luck; Vikram Nair
Culture, Community and Youth
Chairperson	Lim Wee Kiak
Deputy Chairperson	Darryl David
Members	Joan Pereira; Henry Kwek; Lee Yi Shyan; Saktiandi Supaat; Alex Yam; Yee Chia Hsing
Defence and Foreign Affairs
Chairperson	Vikram Nair
Deputy Chairperson	Joan Pereira
Members	Charles Chong; Chong Kee Hiong; Fatimah Abdul Lateef; Henry Kwek; Seah Kian Peng; Teo Ho Pin
Education
Chairperson	Denise Phua
Deputy Chairperson	Intan Azura Mokhtar
Members	Ang Wei Neng; Cheng Li Hui; Foo Mee Har; Lim Wee Kiak; Murali Pillai; Zainal Sapari
Environment and Water Resources (including Climate Change)
Chairperson	Lee Bee Wah
Deputy Chairperson	Gan Thiam Poh
Members	Amrin Amin; Cheng Li Hui; Chia Shi-Lu; Liang Eng Hwa; Louis Ng
Finance and Trade and Industry
Chairperson	Liang Eng Hwa
Deputy Chairperson	Teo Ser Luck
Members	Cedric Foo; Cheryl Chan; Desmond Choo; Foo Mee Har; Henry Kwek; Saktiandi Supaat
Health (including Ageing and Silver Generation Office)
Chairperson	Chia Shi-Lu
Deputy Chairperson	Lily Neo
Members	Charles Chong; Christopher de Souza; Fatimah Abdul Lateef; Joan Pereira; Melvin Yong; Murali Pillai; Tin Pei Ling
Home Affairs and Law
Chairperson	Christopher de Souza
Deputy Chairperson	Murali Pillai
Members	Desmond Choo; Jessica Tan; Louis Ng; Rahayu Mahzam; Patrick Tay; Sitoh Yih Pin
Manpower
Chairperson	Patrick Tay
Deputy Chairperson	Zainal Sapari
Members	Cheryl Chan; Chong Kee Hiong; Intan Azura Mokhtar; Jessica Tan; Lee Yi Shyan; Lim Biow Chuan; Yee Chia Hsing
National Development (including Municipal Services Office)
Chairperson	Alex Yam
Deputy Chairperson	Chong Kee Hiong
Members	Cheryl Chan; Gan Thiam Poh; Lee Bee Wah; Louis Ng; Ong Teng Koon; Saktiandi Supaat
Social and Family Development (including National Population and Talent Division)
Chairperson	Seah Kian Peng
Deputy Chairperson	Rahayu Mahzam
Members	Ang Hin Kee; Darryl David; Denise Phua; Lily Neo; Melvin Yong; Tan Wu Meng
Transport
Chairperson	Sitoh Yih Pin
Deputy Chairperson	Ang Hin Kee
Members	Ang Wei Neng; Cheng Li Hui; Intan Azura Mokhtar; Lim Biow Chuan; Melvin Yong; Sun Xueling; Yee Chia Hsing
