= Arthur Fong =

Singaporean politician

Arthur Fong Jen CBE
- 鄺臻

Member of the Singapore Parliament for West Coast GRC
- In office 2001 – 2015
- Preceded by: PAP held
- Succeeded by: PAP held
- Majority: 2001: N/A (walkover); 2006: N/A (walkover); 2015: 36,120 (33.14%)

Personal details
- Born: Arthur Fong Jen; 24 May 1964 (age 62) State of Singapore, Malaysia
- Party: People's Action Party
- Parent: Fong Sip Chee (father)
- Occupation: Banker, politician

Arthur Fong Jen (Note: Chinese: 邝臻; Jyutping: Fong^{3} Zeon^{1}; pinyin: Kuàng Zhēn) (born 24 May 1964) is a Singaporean banker and former politician. A former member of the country's governing People's Action Party (PAP), Fong was a Member of Parliament representing West Coast Group Representation Constituency (GRC) from 2001 to 2015.

== Career ==
=== Banking career ===
Fong is a private banker, and remained in the profession throughout his three-term tenure in politics.

In 2022, Fong was appointed as chief executive officer (CEO) of One Heritage Capital Management. In 2024, Fong was appointed as the CEO of Paragon Capital Management (HK).

=== Political career ===
Fong first represented West Coast GRC in the Parliament of Singapore as a Member of Parliament in 2001. Fong's party, the PAP, enjoyed a walkover for the constituency in the 2001 and 2006 general elections, but the constituency was contested in 2011 by the Reform Party led by Kenneth Jeyaretnam. Jeyaretnam was defeated by a vote of 66.57% in favour of the PAP candidates, including Fong. Following the election, Fong was returned as the representative for the GRC, and continued his third term in Parliament. He stepped down as MP for Clementi before the 2015 elections in September of that year.

== Personal life ==
Fong's father, Fong Sip Chee, was a former MP of Stamford constituency from 1963 to 1976 and Kampong Chai Chee from 1976 to 1988. His father was also formerly the Minister of State for Culture.

== Awards and recognition ==
In 2014, the Institute of Banking and Finance awarded him an IBF fellowship, in recognition of his work in the financial industry. That year, Fong was also appointed honorary Commander of the Most Excellent Order of the British Empire for his service in public office.

== Notes ==
Parliament of Singapore
Preceded by Bernard Chen; S. Iswaran; Lim Hng Kiang; Wan Soon Bee	Member of Parliament for West Coast GRC; 2001–2015; Served alongside: (2001-2006): Ho Geok Choo, Cedric Foo, Lim Hng Kiang, S. Iswaran (2006-2011): Ho Geok Choo, Cedric Foo, Lim Hng Kiang, S. Iswaran (2011-2015): Foo Mee Har, Lawrence Wong, Lim Hng Kiang, S. Iswaran	Succeeded by Foo Mee Har; Desmond Lee; Ang Wei Neng; Rachel Ong; S. Iswaran
