= Marital rape immunity in Singapore =

Repealed law in Singapore

Marital rape generally refers to non-consensual sexual intercourse between married spouses. In Singapore, there used to be a partial immunity for marital rape first introduced during British colonial rule because it was deemed not a criminal offence except when the wife is below 13 years of age or when any of the specific circumstances provided under section 375(4) of the Singapore Penal Code are satisfied. Since 1 January 2020, the law was repealed and its immunity lifted under the Criminal Law Reform Act 2019, criminalising marital rape.

Marital rape has been identified by the United Nations General Assembly to be a form of violence against women in the Declaration on the Elimination of Violence Against Women (DEVAW). The DEVAW is said to complement and strengthen the implementation of the Convention on the Elimination of All Forms of Discrimination Against Women (CEDAW), which Singapore ratified on 5 October 1995.

== Marital rape immunity under Singapore law ==
=== Origins of the immunity ===
The marital rape immunity under Singapore law is believed to have originated from an extrajudicial remark by English jurist Sir Matthew Hale in “The History of the Pleas of the Crown”, where he stated that a husband cannot be guilty of marital rape against his wife because the latter had irrevocably consented to sexual relations during the marriage. This principle of irrevocable consent was later cited in several English cases as justification for immunity against marital rape. The immunity was eventually imported into Singapore law as part of the English common law by the application of English Law Act 1993.

=== Legislative reform in 2007 ===
The marital rape immunity was the subject of legislative amendments in the Penal Code (Amendment) Act 2007. Prior to the amendments, section 375(e) provided blanket immunity to husbands who had non-consensual sexual intercourse with their wives as long as the latter was not below 13 years of age. The proposed amendment to section 375(e) did not seek to abolish the immunity altogether but, instead, sought to introduce exceptions to the immunity such that it would be lifted when there is some evidence of breakdown in the marriage concerned, such as when:

- the wife, who was living apart from her husband, has obtained an interim judgment of divorce or nullity, a judgment or decree of judicial separation, or a written separation agreement;
- the wife, who was living apart from her husband, has commenced legal proceedings for divorce, nullity or judicial separation;
- there is a court injunction that restrains the husband from having sexual intercourse with his wife;
- the wife has obtained a Protection Order or Expedited Order against her husband; or
- the wife has commenced proceedings for a Protection Order or Expedited Order from her husband.

Introducing the proposed amendments at the Second Reading debate of the Penal Code (Amendment) Bill 2007, then Senior Minister of State for Home Affairs Ho Peng Kee described the proposed section 375(4) as a “calibrated approach” that balances the “needs of women who require protection, general concerns about conjugal rights and the expression of intimacy in a marriage”. To this end, total abolition of the immunity was precluded as the Ministry was concerned that such a radical step would “change the whole complexion of marriage” in the Singaporean society.

Whilst the Members of Parliament (MPs) were unequivocal in their condemnation of marital rape in principle, reactions to the extent of the proposed amendments were mixed. On the one hand, MP Teo Ho Pin supported the Ministry's calibrated approach, recognising the difficulties inherent in determining lack of consent in sexual relations between married spouses. It was suggested that women in strained marriages should express their non-consent by taking out legal proceedings, as outlined in the proposed section 375(4), from which the intention of non-consent for sexual intercourse with their husbands may be more clearly inferred.

On the other hand, several MPs spoke in support of the total abolition of the marital rape immunity. MP Ellen Lee questioned the lack of safeguards in cases where the wife has not yet commenced the legal processes required to lift the immunity or is unable to do so because of financial or emotional reasons. MP Ho Geok Choo criticised the proposed amendments as being insufficient to protect women who are “most dependent on their husbands as well as those who will have the least access to legal counsel”. Several MPs also expressed concern at the presumption of the wife's consent to have sexual intercourse in the proposed section 375(4), suggesting that there should not be a difference drawn between rape occurring within the context of a marriage and outside of one.

Eventually, the Bill was passed without modification and came into force on 1 January 2008.

=== Calls for total abolition ===
Since the 2007 legislative amendments, there have been ongoing calls for the total abolition of the marital rape immunity both domestically and internationally. In 2009, a Singapore-based online petition "No to Rape" was set up to specifically campaign for the total abolition of the immunity. A total of 3,618 individuals signed the petition to the Prime Minister of Singapore for the repeal of section 375(4).

In the international arena, the Canadian delegation recommended the introduction of legislation to criminalise marital rape in all circumstances during Singapore's Universal Periodic Review (UPR) in 2011. It was noted that this recommendation did not enjoy the support of the Singapore Government. In the Stakeholder's Report to the Working Group on the Universal Periodic Review, a joint submission by several non-governmental organisations also called for the partial immunity for marital rape to be repealed.

At Singapore's UPR in 2016, the need for the abolition of the marital rape immunity was reiterated. In response, Ambassador-at-Large Chan Heng Chee noted that Singapore “would actively review the need to repeal the marital rape immunity”. While no definitive answer has been given to the question of whether or when the marital rape immunity will be repealed, some believe that Singapore's response at the 2016 UPR indicates that the abolition of the marital rape immunity is forthcoming. In April 2017, then Minister of Social and Family Development, Tan Chuan-Jin confirmed in Parliament that review of the marital rape immunity is underway. To this end, he expressed the view that “married women should have the same access to protection as unmarried women” and “although married persons have conjugal rights over each other, such rights should be exercised within reasonable behaviour”.

=== Law repealed and immunity lifted ===
The Criminal Law Reform Act 2019 was passed on 6 May 2019, which includes repealing marital rape immunity. The new laws came into force on 1 January 2020. The new laws were first utilised in 2024 when a man was convicted to eight years of jail and six strokes of cane for sexually assaulting his wife and obstructing justice.

== Singapore’s obligations under CEDAW ==
Marital rape, and by extension legal immunities to marital rape, are contrary to human rights as a recognised form of violence against women in the DEVAW. Article 2 of the CEDAW, which Singapore has ratified, ‘condemns discrimination against woman in all its forms’. Further, Article 16 of the CEDAW requires state parties “to eliminate discrimination against woman in all matters relating to marriage and family relations” to ensure equality between men and women. The CEDAW Committee in their General Recommendation 19 has also identified family violence, including marital rape, as a form of discrimination under Article 16. It has also been suggested that the non-criminalisation of marital rape amounts to discriminatory treatment in two ways – first, by discriminating between violence directed at women specifically from other types of violence, and, second, by discriminating between violence inflicted in the private sphere and public sphere.

Singapore has made reservations to a number of provisions in the CEDAW, including Article 2 paragraphs (a) to (f), and Article 16 paragraphs 1(a), (c), (h) and (2). Noting this at Singapore's fourth periodic report to the CEDAW Committee in 2011, the Committee called for the State to withdraw these reservations which “are impermissible, since those articles are fundamental to the implementation” of the Convention.

Furthermore, the Committee also highlighted the limited effectiveness of section 375(4) in safeguarding women against domestic and sexual violence given that the immunity is only lifted in specific circumstances – that the perpetrator and the victim are living apart and are in the midst of terminating their marriage or that the victim has applied for a protective order against the perpetrator. Hence, the Committee urged for the criminalisation of marital rape and for the definition of rape to cover every non-consensual sexual act.
