= Wang Liting =

Wang Liting may refer to:

- Anthea Ong, Singaporean businesswoman and politician
- Olivia Ong, Singaporean singer and actress
