= Patrick Tay =

Singaporean politician

The Honourable Patrick Tay BBM
- 郑德源
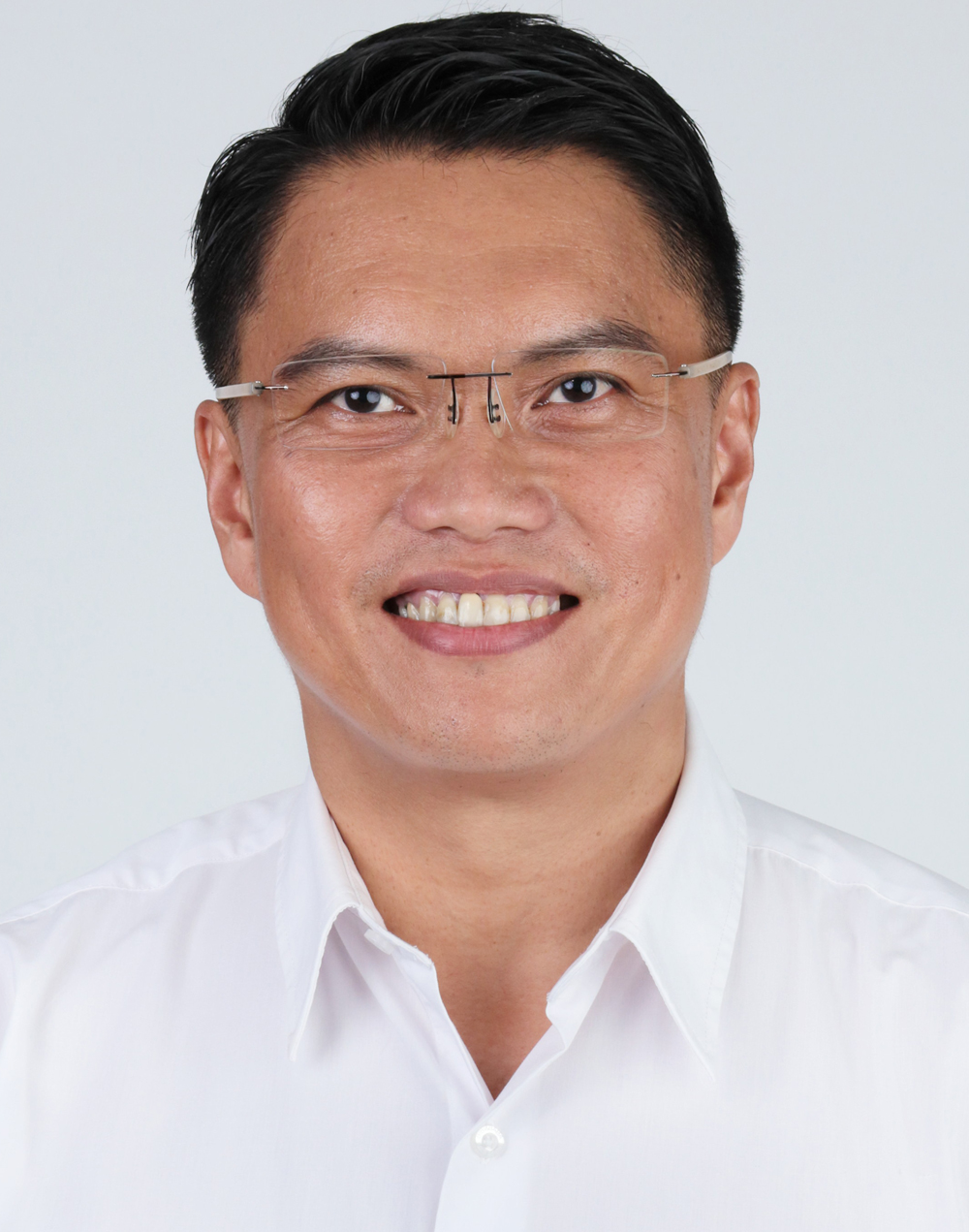
- Official portrait, 2021

Member of the Singapore Parliament for Pioneer SMC
- Incumbent
- Assumed office 10 July 2020
- Preceded by: Cedric Foo (PAP)
- Majority: 2020: 6,304 (26.78%); 2025: 7,250 (30.90%)

Member of the Singapore Parliament for West Coast GRC
- In office 11 September 2015 – 23 June 2020
- Preceded by: PAP held
- Succeeded by: PAP held
- Majority: 51,788 (57.14%)

Member of the Singapore Parliament for Nee Soon GRC
- In office 7 May 2011 – 24 August 2015
- Preceded by: Constituency established
- Succeeded by: PAP held
- Majority: 23,217 (16.8%)

Personal details
- Born: Patrick Tay Teck Guan; 1 December 1971 (age 54) Singapore
- Party: People's Action Party
- Education: National University of Singapore (LLB, LLM)
- Occupation: Politician; lawyer

Patrick Tay Teck Guan (Note: Chinese: 郑德源; Pe̍h-ōe-jī: Tēⁿ Tek-goân; pinyin: Zhèng Déyuán) BBM (born 1 December 1971) is a Singaporean politician and lawyer. A member of the governing People's Action Party (PAP), he has been the Member of Parliament (MP) for Pioneer Single Member Constituency (SMC) since 2020. He had previously represented the Nee Soon East division of Nee Soon Group Representation Constituency (GRC) between 2011 and 2015, and the Boon Lay division of West Coast GRC between 2015 and 2020.

A lawyer by profession, Tay has held positions in various trade unions in Singapore since 2002, and has been an assistant secretary-general of the National Trades Union Congress (NTUC) since February 2014.

== Education ==
Tay attended St. Patrick's School and Temasek Junior College. In 1990, he received a Public Service Commission Local Merit Scholarship to read law at the National University of Singapore, from which he graduated with a Bachelor of Laws with honours degree in 1995.

He subsequently went on to complete a Master of Laws degree at the National University of Singapore in 1999 and an Advanced Management Program at Harvard Business School in 2014. In 2015, he received a Lien Fellowship from Nanyang Technological University.

== Career ==
Tay started his career in the Singapore Police Force and served from 1995 to 2002, during which he was the commanding officer of the Special Tactics and Rescue (STAR) unit. From 2002 to 2014, he held positions in various trade unions, including the assistant directorship of the National Trades Union Congress (2002–2004).

As of 2015, Tay was an assistant secretary-general and director of strategy and legal services at NTUC, as well as executive secretary of the Singapore Manual and Mercantile Workers' Union, and executive secretary of the Banking & Financial Services Union. He has also held positions at various other organisations.

An advocate and solicitor of the Supreme Court, Tay is also an associate mediator of the Singapore Mediation Centre and a fellow of the Singapore Institute of Arbitrators.

Prior to formally entering politics, Tay was a grassroots leader at multiple community- and constituency-level positions; one was being the Executive Secretary of the Young PAP Executive Committee. At his political debut, he had close to a decade of leadership experience in grassroots work.

=== Political career ===
Tay entered politics in the 2011 general election when he joined a five-member People's Action Party (PAP) team contesting in Nee Soon GRC. After the PAP team won 58.4% of the vote against the Workers' Party (WP), Tay became an elected Member of Parliament representing the Nee Soon East ward of Nee Soon GRC. In 2014, Tay raised the concerns of PMEs (Note: Professionals, managers and executives.) and how the Budget could support them in terms of protection, progression, placement and privileges.

During the 2015 general election, Tay was sent to West Coast GRC to join the four-member PAP team; they won 78.57% of the vote against the Reform Party (RP). Tay thus became a Member of Parliament for a second term, representing the Boon Lay ward of West Coast GRC.

In the 2016 debate on the President's Address, Tay called for a PME dependency ratio, akin to those for S Passes (Note: A pass to allow skilled workers who do not meet the criteria for an Employment Pass (EP) to be employed. The starting salary for a first-time candidate is S$3,150.) and work permits, to be implemented for companies with a weak Singaporean core and a weak commitment to creating one.

In the 2020 general election, Cedric Foo, the incumbent MP for Pioneer SMC, retired from politics; Tay was redeployed to contest the SMC. He won the contest with 61.98% of the vote against the Progress Singapore Party (PSP) candidate Lim Cher Hong and independent candidate Cheang Peng Wah.

During the 2025 general election, Tay won reelection in Pioneer SMC the contest against PSP candidate Stephanie Tan.

==== GPC appointments ====
Throughout his first two terms in Parliament, Tay was a member of the Government Parliamentary Committees (GPCs) for Manpower and Health (2011–2015), and Home Affairs and Law (2015–2020). He was also the chairperson of the GPC for Manpower from 2015 to 2020.

== Awards ==
Tay received the Good Service Medal from the Singapore Police Force in 2000 and the Public Service Medal in 2005 for his community work. He also received the PAP Youth Service Medal and the 15 Years Community Long Service Award from the People's Association in 2007, and the Public Service Star in 2010.

== Personal life ==
Tay is a Christian. He is married and has three children.

== Notes ==
Parliament of Singapore
New constituency	Member of Parliament for Nee Soon GRC; 2011–2015; Served alongside: Lim Wee Kiak, K. Shanmugam, Lee Bee Wah, Muhammad Faishal Ibrahim	Succeeded by K. Shanmugam; Henry Kwek; Lee Bee Wah; Louis Ng Kok Kwang; Muhammad Faishal Ibrahim
Preceded by Foo Mee Har; Lawrence Wong; Arthur Fong; Lim Hng Kiang; S. Iswaran	Member of Parliament for West Coast GRC; 2015–2020; Served alongside: Foo Mee Har, Lim Hng Kiang, S. Iswaran	Succeeded by Foo Mee Har; Desmond Lee; Ang Wei Neng; Rachel Ong; S. Iswaran
Preceded by Cedric Foo	Member of Parliament for Pioneer SMC; 2020–present	Incumbent
