= Lists of members of parliament in Singapore =

The following are lists of members of parliament in Singapore:

- 1st Parliament of Singapore § Members, 1965
- 2nd Parliament of Singapore § Members, 1968
- 3rd Parliament of Singapore § Members, 1972
- 4th Parliament of Singapore § Members, 1977
- 5th Parliament of Singapore § Members, 1981
- 6th Parliament of Singapore § Members, 1985
- 7th Parliament of Singapore § Members, 1989
- 8th Parliament of Singapore § Members, 1992
- 9th Parliament of Singapore § Members, 1997
- 10th Parliament of Singapore, 2002
- 11th Parliament of Singapore, 2006
- List of members of the 12th Parliament of Singapore, 2011
- List of members of the 13th Parliament of Singapore, 2016
- 14th Parliament of Singapore, 2020
- 15th Parliament of Singapore, 2025

== See also ==
- Parliament of Singapore
- Speaker of the Parliament of Singapore
- Nominated Member of Parliament
- Non-constituency Member of Parliament
- Elections in Singapore
- Constitution of Singapore
