= Lim Hng Kiang =

Singaporean politician

- 林勋强
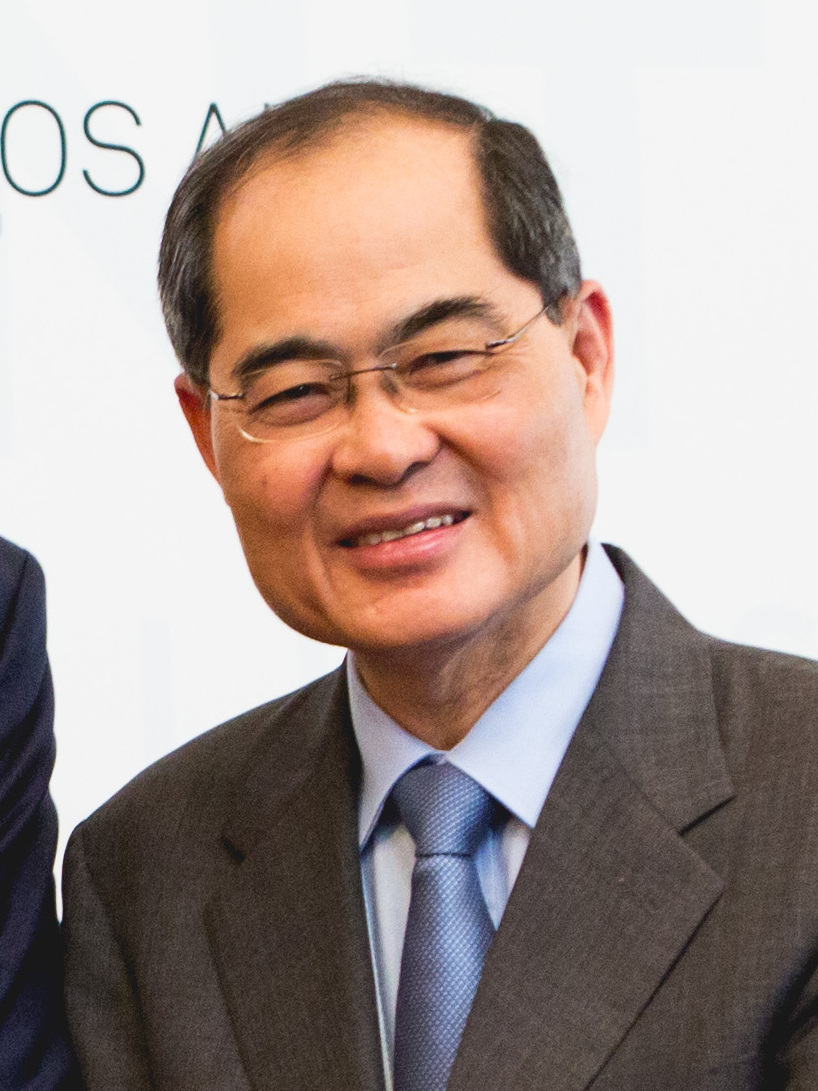
- Lim in 2017

Minister for Trade and Industry (Trade)
- In office 12 August 2004 – 30 April 2018 Serving with S. Iswaran (Industry)
- Prime Minister: Lee Hsien Loong
- Second Minister: Vivian Balakrishnan; S. Iswaran
- Preceded by: George Yeo
- Succeeded by: Chan Chun Sing (as Minister for Trade and Industry)

Minister in the Prime Minister's Office
- In office 1 August 2003 – 11 August 2004
- Prime Minister: Goh Chok Tong; Lee Hsien Loong

Minister for Health
- In office 3 June 1999 – 31 July 2003
- Prime Minister: Goh Chok Tong
- Preceded by: Yeo Cheow Tong
- Succeeded by: Khaw Boon Wan

Minister for National Development
- In office 17 April 1995 – 4 June 1999; Acting: 2 January 1994 – 16 April 1995
- Prime Minister: Goh Chok Tong
- Preceded by: Richard Hu
- Succeeded by: Mah Bow Tan

Member of the Singapore Parliament for West Coast GRC
- In office 2 January 1997 – 23 June 2020
- Preceded by: Constituency established
- Succeeded by: PAP held
- Majority: 1997: 27,725 (40.28%); 2001: N/A (walkover); 2006: N/A (walkover); 2011: 36,120 (33.14%); 2015: 51,788 (57.14%)

Member of the Singapore Parliament for Tanjong Pagar GRC
- In office 21 August 1991 – 16 December 1996
- Preceded by: Constituency established
- Succeeded by: PAP held
- Majority: N/A (walkover)

Personal details
- Born: Lim Hng Kiang; 9 April 1954 (age 72) Colony of Singapore
- Party: People's Action Party
- Spouse: Lee Ai Boon
- Children: 2
- Education: Christ's College, Cambridge; Harvard University

Military service
- Branch/service: Singapore Army
- Rank: Lieutenant Colonel

Lim Hng Kiang (Note: Chinese: 林勋强; Pe̍h-ōe-jī: Lîm Hng-kiâng; pinyin: Lín Xūnqiáng) (born 9 April 1954) is a Singaporean former politician and military officer who served as Minister for Trade and Industry between 2004 and 2018, Minister in the Prime Minister's Office in 2003 and 2004, Minister for Health between 1999 and 2003 and Minister for National Development between 1994 and 1999. A member of the governing People's Action Party (PAP), he was the Member of Parliament (MP) for the Telok Blangah division of Tanjong Pagar Group Representation Constituency (GRC) between 1991 and 1997 and the same division in West Coast GRC between 1997 and 2020.

== Education ==
Lim was educated in Raffles Institution, before being awarded a President's Scholarship and Singapore Armed Forces Overseas Scholarship to study at the University of Cambridge, where he completed a degree in engineering in 1976. In 1985, Lim was awarded a scholarship to study for a Master of Public Administration degree at the John F. Kennedy School of Government at Harvard University.

== Career ==
Lim began his career in the Singapore Armed Forces (SAF) and left with the rank of lieutenant-colonel. He later served as a deputy secretary at the Ministry of National Development, and as the chief executive officer (CEO) of the Housing and Development Board (HDB).

Lim served as the deputy chairman of the Monetary Authority of Singapore (MAS) from 2006 until 2021 and is also a board director of the Government of Singapore Investment Corporation (GIC).

=== Political career ===
Lim was first elected to Parliament in 1991 as an MP for the Tanjong Pagar GRC. Since 1997, he has represented the West Coast GRC.

Lim was appointed a Minister of State at the Ministry of National Development in 1991. In 1994, he became the Acting Minister for National Development and Senior Minister of State at the Ministry of Foreign Affairs.

In 1995, Lim became the Minister for National Development and Second Minister for Foreign Affairs. In 1998, he relinquished the role of Second Minister for Foreign Affairs and became the Second Minister for Finance.

In 1999, Lim became the Minister for Health. He also retained the portfolio of Second Minister for Finance.

During the severe acute respiratory syndrome (SARS) epidemic that swept through the region, many Singaporeans felt his initial handling of the crisis, citing his lack of leadership and indecisiveness, helped prolong the epidemic that eventually drove the economy into a recession. While then Deputy Prime Minister Lee Hsien Loong said "SARS has significantly disrupted our economy. It has affected not only tourist spending but also domestic consumption... certainly our first half growth will be affected, and we will have to revise down our growth forecasts for the year." Others cited his calls to quarantine patients and to close and extend local school holidays were late in coming.

Many local residents also pointed to the administrators at Tan Tock Seng Hospital for mishandling and underestimating the severity of SARS. When "At least 85 percent of people infected by SARS in Singapore caught it while visiting or working at hospitals", said Osman David Mansoor at the World Health Organization. "The remainder mostly came down with it at home through close contact with sick family members", he said.

In 2003, Lim was made a minister in the Prime Minister's Office. He retained the role of Second Minister for Finance.

Lim was made the Minister for Trade and Industry in 2004. He was subsequently put in charge of trade at the Ministry of Trade and Industry (MTI). The ministry was split into two, with Lim taking the trade portfolio and the industry portfolio taken by S. Iswaran.

Lim stepped down from the cabinet on 30 April 2018 and appointed as special advisor to MTI.

During 2020 Singaporean general election, Lim announced his retirement from politics.

== Personal life ==
Lim has two sons. His wife, Lee Ai Boon, died of cancer on 12 April 2014.

== Notes ==
Political offices
Preceded by Richard Hu Tsu Tau	Minister for National Development; 1994 – 1995 (Acting), 1995 – 1999	Succeeded by Mah Bow Tan
Preceded by Yeo Cheow Tong	Minister for Health; 1999 – 2003	Succeeded by Khaw Boon Wan
Preceded by ?	Minister in the Prime Minister's Office; 2003 – 2004	Succeeded by Lim Swee Say
Preceded by George Yeo	Minister for Trade and Industry; 2004 – 2015	Succeeded by Himself as Minister for Trade and Industry (Trade)
Preceded by George Yeo	Minister for Trade and Industry; 2004 – 2015	Succeeded by S. Iswaran as Minister for Trade and Industry (Industry)
Preceded by Himself as Minister for Trade and Industry	Minister for Trade and Industry (Trade); 2015 – 2018; Served alongside: S. Iswaran (Industry)	Succeeded by Chan Chun Sing as Minister for Trade and Industry
Parliament of Singapore
New constituency	Member of Parliament for Tanjong Pagar GRC; 1991 – 1997; Served alongside: S. Vasoo, Koo Tsai Kee, Lee Kuan Yew	Succeeded by Lim Swee Say; Chay Wai Chuen; S. Vasoo; Koo Tsai Kee; Lee Kuan Yew
New constituency	Member of Parliament for West Coast GRC; 1997 – 2020; Served alongside: (1997 – 2001): Bernard Chen, S. Iswaran, Wan Soon Bee (2001 – 2006): Ho Geok Choo, Arthur Fong, Cedric Foo, S. Iswaran (2001 – 2011): Ho Geok Choo, Arthur Fong, Cedric Foo, S. Iswaran (2011 – 2015): Foo Mee Har, Lawrence Wong, Arthur Fong, S. Iswaran (2015 – 2020): Foo Mee Har, Patrick Tay, S. Iswaran	Succeeded by Foo Mee Har; Desmond Lee; Ang Wei Neng; Rachel Ong; S. Iswaran
