= Standard Chartered Thailand =

Thai financial services company

Standard Chartered Bank Thailand
- Company type: Subsidiary
- Industry: Banking
- Founded: 1894; 132 years ago
- Headquarters: Thailand
- Products: Loans, Credit Cards, Debit Cards, Savings, Consumer Banking, Business Banking
- Parent: Standard Chartered
- Website: www.sc.com/th

Standard Chartered Thailand (officially Standard Chartered Bank (Thai) PCL, Thai: ธนาคารสแตนดาร์ด ชาร์เตอร์ด (ไทย) จำกัด (มหาชน)) is a banking and financial services company in Thailand and a subsidiary of Standard Chartered. It serves wholesale banking customers.

== History ==
Standard Chartered Bank has been in Thailand since 1894 when the Chartered Bank of India, Australia and China first established a branch in Bangkok.

In 1999, Standard Chartered acquired 75% of the shares of Thailand's Nakornthon Bank for 12.377 billion baht (£193 million at the time). Twenty-five per cent of the shares are held by the Financial Institutions Development Fund, a fund established by the Bank of Thailand, which has recapitalised Nakornthon to approximately seven billion baht (£109 million). Nakornthon Bank was established in 1933 under the name Wang Lee Chan Bank, but changed its name to Nakornthon Bank in 1985. After the acquisition, Standard Chartered changed the bank's name to Standard Chartered Nakornthon Bank. At the time of the acquisition, Nakornthon Bank, with 67 domestic branches, was the second oldest Thai bank. With assets of approximately £1 billion, it ranked 12 of 13 Thai commercial banks by asset size.

In 2005, Standard Chartered merged its Bangkok branch into Standard Chartered Nakornthon Bank, and renamed the new entity Standard Chartered Bank (Thai) PCL.
