= Anthea Ong =

Singaporean politician

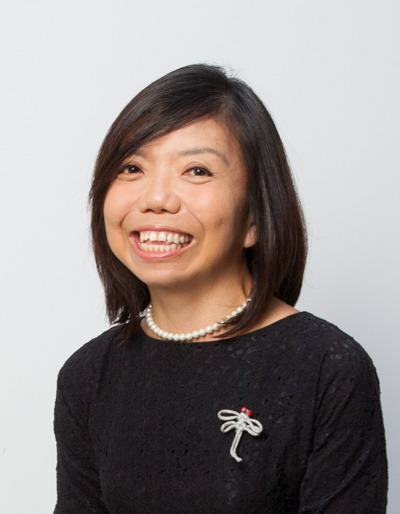
- Ong in 2018
- Born: Ong Lay Theng; 1968 (age 57–58)
- Office: Nominated Member of Parliament
- Political party: Non-partisan

Anthea Indira Ong Lay Theng (Chinese: 王丽婷; pinyin: Wáng Lìtíng; born 1968) is a former Nominated Member of Parliament (NMP) for the 13th Parliament of Singapore. Ong is also a full-time entrepreneur and social advocate, and founder of social organisations including Hush TeaBar and A Good Space.

== Background ==
Ong attended Cedar Girls' Secondary School and National Junior College. She holds a business degree from the National University of Singapore.

== Professional career ==
After graduation, Ong worked at United Overseas Bank and then conference organiser AiC.

Ong is a professional certified coach by the International Coach Federation. She has served over 40 clients from Singapore, Malaysia, Cambodia, Philippines, Japan, France, Portugal, Spain, UK and the USA.

Ong held leadership roles with multinational organisations including Pearson Plc, New York Institute of Finance, The Terrapinn Group and United Overseas Bank.

Between 2002 and 2008, Ong founded the Singapore-based education and technology consultancy, Knowledge Director Group.

From 2008 to 2013, Ong was Managing Director (Indonesia, Malaysia & Singapore) at Omega Performance Inc, a Washington DC-headquartered strategy and performance-improvement consulting group for banks and financial institutions. Additionally, she was also the Asian Lead of the Global Corporate Responsibility Board for Informa Plc.

In December 2013, Ong left the corporate world to focus on her social entrepreneurship and advocacy efforts.

== Social advocacy ==
In 2013, Ong founded the social project Playground of Joy, introducing an educational programme that integrates mindfulness into its curriculum. Ong is working on expanding her Playground of Joy project to Rohingya refugees in Bangladesh, while also serving children with special needs and financial assistance within Singapore.

In 2014, Ong founded the social enterprise Hush TeaBar, Singapore's first silent tea bar. Through its employment of the deaf and individuals with mental health issues, Hush seeks to bridge the gap between the hearing and non-hearing world. Through Hush, Ong hopes to address the epidemic of mental health issues faced by most Singaporean workplaces and schools.

In 2017, Ong co-founded A Good Space, a not-for-profit initiative, with the support of National Volunteer and Philanthropy Centre (NVPC). Through nurturing a community of changemakers, A Good Space looks to improve volunteerism for social causes in Singapore.

Within the same year, Ong founded Our Tree Stories, a social movement where Singaporeans are asked to share their stories about their favourite trees. The movement was created to encourage Singaporeans to humanise trees, in an attempt to improve awareness about climate change and conservation.

In May 2018, Ong founded Workwell Leaders Workgroup together with 25 Singaporean work leaders, including representatives from Johnson & Johnson, DBS Bank, Deloitte and National University Health System. The workgroup looks to champion mental well-being as a leadership priority in workplaces. As of 2021, The Workwell Leaders Workgroup has worked with more than 100 leaders in Singapore.

In December 2019, Ong launched a public consultation on mental healthcare in Singapore, intending on utilising the findings to support her Budget 2020 speech.

In February 2020, given the "overwhelming response" that they have received for their public consultation on mental healthcare, Ong and her team of volunteers launched the community initiative "SG Mental Health Matters", through a website meant as a "coalescing point" for advocacy efforts in mental wellness within Singapore. In April 2021, Ong and SG Mental Health Matters has launched another initiative to start a conversation on mental health sentiments via the #AreWeOkay poll amid the COVID-19 pandemic in Singapore.

Ong was one of three Singaporean women who went on an expedition to Antarctica to study climate change in 2018, funded by the 2041 Foundation.

Additionally, Ong served as the president of the Women's Initiative for Ageing Successfully (WINGS) from 2014 to 2016 (board member from 2010), an organisation helping women embrace ageing with confidence. From 2014 to 2016, she was also a Founding Board Member of Daughters of Tomorrow, a registered charity that supports the empowerment of women through individualised coaching.

== Political career ==
Ong was one of the nine Nominated Members of Parliament (NMP) chosen on 17 September 2018 for the 13th Parliament of Singapore. Speaking to The Straits Times after her appointment was announced, Ong said that she intended to speak on issues of social inclusion, mental health and volunteerism.

Ong's maiden speech involved a call to make mental health a national priority. In response to the Employment (Amendment) Bill, to which she lauded the reference to employee well-being, she stressed that mental well-being should be a whole-of-government priority with the recognition that "subjective well-being" is key in ascertaining one's quality of life. In her speech, she also states her wish that policies act empower rather than enable Singaporeans to be ready for challenges ahead.

== Publications ==
Ong has published a book titled "50 Shades of Love: Unearthing Who We Are". Within the book, she penned 50 shorts explaining how love in its different forms has lifted her up throughout different seasons in her life. In 2016, Ong has also published a chapter for My life, my story II : more memoirs from Singapore's seniors, an anthology by the National Library Board of Singapore, namely Lost. And Found.

== Personal life ==
Ong was married in 2004 and later divorced.
