= West Coast Group Representation Constituency =

Former electoral division in Singapore

West Coast
- Former group representation constituency for the Parliament of Singapore
- Region: West and Central Regions, Singapore
- Electorate: 146,251

Former constituency
- Created: 1997; 29 years ago
- Abolished: 2025; 1 year ago
- Seats: 5
- Member: Constituency abolished
- Town Council: West Coast
- Created from: Brickworks GRC; Tanjong Pagar GRC
- Replaced by: Tanjong Pagar GRC (Telok Blangah and Dover); Radin Mas SMC (HarbourFront, Sentosa and Southern Islands); West Coast–Jurong West GRC (all other areas)

The West Coast Group Representation Constituency was a five-member group representation constituency (GRC) in western and central Singapore. It covered the areas of Jurong, Dover, Pasir Panjang, West Coast and Telok Blangah, as well as Jurong Island, an offshore island of Singapore. At abolition, it had five divisions: Ayer Rajah–Gek Poh, Boon Lay, Nanyang, Telok Blangah and West Coast, managed by West Coast Town Council.

== History ==
=== 1997: Creation ===
In the 1997 general election, West Coast GRC was created from Brickworks GRC and the Telok Blangah division of Tanjong Pagar GRC and assigned four Members of Parliament (MPs). The team for the governing People's Action Party (PAP), led by Lim Hng Kiang, defeated the Workers' Party with 70% of the vote.

=== 2001–2006: Walkovers ===
In the 2001 general election, West Coast GRC gained one MP to became a five-member GRC after Boon Lay Single Member Constituency (SMC) was abolished and merged into it. The PAP team won unopposed.

In the 2006 general election, the GRC absorbed Ayer Rajah SMC; Tan Cheng Bock, incumbent PAP MP for the SMC and future opposition politician, made his initial retirement from politics at the same election. The PAP team again won unopposed.

=== 2011–2015: RP contests ===
In the 2011 general election, Pioneer SMC was carved out of West Coast GRC; the PAP defeated the Reform Party (RP) with 66.57% of the vote. At the same election, Lawrence Wong, future Prime Minister and MP for Marsiling–Yew Tee GRC, made his political debut as a PAP candidate for West Coast GRC. He was assigned to the Boon Lay division.

In the 2015 general election, West Coast GRC lost its Clementi division to Jurong GRC, becoming a four-member GRC in the process. The PAP defeated the RP with 78.57% of the vote.

=== 2020: PSP contest ===
In the 2020 general election, West Coast GRC was re-expanded to become a five-member GRC, gaining the Nanyang division of Chua Chu Kang GRC and the Jurong West section of Hong Kah North SMC.

In 2019, Tan co-founded the Progress Singapore Party (PSP) with 11 others, a part of whom had, like him, previously belonged to the PAP. Together with Lee Hsien Yang, the estranged younger brother of then-Prime Minister Lee Hsien Loong, the 12 said that the PAP had "lost its way" and deviated from its founding principles. The party was officially registered on 28 March 2019 after being approved by the Registry of Societies.

During the election, Desmond Lee and Ang Wei Neng, both incumbent PAP MPs for Jurong GRC, were redeployed to the GRC. Tan, meanwhile, contested West Coast GRC, personally leading the PSP's "A-team"; the move was framed as a return to his defunct Ayer Rajah SMC. In its worst performance in the history of West Coast GRC, the PAP defeated the PSP with 51.68% of the vote.

After the election, two non-constituency MP (NCMP) seats were offered to the PSP team for West Coast GRC by virtue of their electoral performance. Hazel Poa and Leong Mun Wai were appointed.

==== Resignation of S. Iswaran (2024) ====
In January 2024, S. Iswaran resigned from the PAP, the ministership for transport and his seat as MP for West Coast GRC. He had been charged in the State Courts of Singapore with 27 charges relating to bribery and corruption following investigations that started in July 2023.

=== 2025: Abolition ===
Prior to the 2025 general election, West Coast GRC was abolished, with the majority of its area being merged into the new West Coast–Jurong West GRC. Estates in Telok Blangah and Dover were reassigned to Tanjong Pagar GRC, while those in Harbourfront and on the offshore island of Sentosa were reassigned to Radin Mas SMC alongside the Southern Islands.

== Members of Parliament ==
Year	Division	Members of Parliament	Party
Formation
1997	Clementi; Pasir Panjang; Telok Blangah; West Coast	Bernard Chen; S. Iswaran; Lim Hng Kiang; Wan Soon Bee	PAP
2001	Boon Lay; Clementi; Pioneer; Telok Blangah; West Coast	Ho Geok Choo; Arthur Fong; Cedric Foo; Lim Hng Kiang; S. Iswaran	PAP
2006	Ayer Rajah-West Coast; Boon Lay; Clementi; Pioneer; Telok Blangah	S. Iswaran; Ho Geok Choo; Arthur Fong; Cedric Foo; Lim Hng Kiang	PAP
2011	Ayer Rajah; Boon Lay; Clementi; Telok Blangah; West Coast	Foo Mee Har; Lawrence Wong; Arthur Fong; Lim Hng Kiang; S. Iswaran	PAP
2015	Ayer Rajah; Boon Lay; Telok Blangah; West Coast	Foo Mee Har; Patrick Tay; Lim Hng Kiang; S. Iswaran	PAP
2020	Ayer Rajah-Gek Poh; Boon Lay; Nanyang; Telok Blangah; West Coast	Foo Mee Har; Desmond Lee; Ang Wei Neng; Rachel Ong; S. Iswaran (2020–2024)	PAP
Constituency abolished (2025)

== Electoral results ==
Note: The Elections Department does not include rejected votes when calculating the vote shares of candidates. Hence, all candidates' vote shares will total to 100% at any given election (may not appear so in multi-way contests due to rounding).

=== Elections in 1990s ===
General Election 1997
Party	Candidate	Votes	%
PAP	Bernard Chen S. Iswaran Lim Hng Kiang Wan Soon Bee	48,275	70.14
WP	Mike Chan D'Cruz Anthony John Gan Eng Guan Ng Teck Siong	20,550	29.86
Majority		27,725	40.28
Total valid votes		68,825	97.50
Rejected ballots		1,762	2.50
Turnout		70,587	95.36
Registered electors		74,022	
PAP win (new seat)			

=== Elections in 2000s ===
General Election 2001
Party	Candidate	Votes	%	±%
PAP	Ho Geok Choo; Arthur Fong; Cedric Foo; Lim Hng Kiang; S. Iswaran	Unopposed		
Registered electors		110,779		▲49.66
PAP hold				

General Election 2006
Party	Candidate	Votes	%	±%
PAP	S. Iswaran; Ho Geok Choo; Arthur Fong; Cedric Foo; Lim Hng Kiang	Unopposed		
Registered electors		137,739		▲24.34
PAP hold				

=== Elections in 2010s ===
General Election 2011
Party	Candidate	Votes	%	±%
PAP	Arthur Fong Foo Mee Har Lim Hng Kiang S. Iswaran Lawrence Wong	72,563	66.57	N/A
RP	Kenneth Jeyaretnam Andy Zhu Frankie Low Kumar Appavoo Haren Hu	36,443	33.43	N/A
Majority		36,120	33.14	N/A
Total valid votes		109,006	97.48	N/A
Rejected ballots		2,821	2.52	N/A
Turnout		111,827	92.38	N/A
Registered electors		121,045		▼12.12
PAP hold		Swing	N/A	

General Election 2015
Party	Candidate	Votes	%	±%
PAP	Foo Mee Har Patrick Tay Lim Hng Kiang S. Iswaran	71,214	78.57	▲11.91
RP	Kenneth Jeyaretnam Andy Zhu Darren Soh Noraini Yunus	19,426	21.43	▼11.91
Majority		51,788	57.14	▲24.00
Total valid votes		90,640	97.40	▼0.08
Rejected ballots		2,416	2.60	▲0.08
Turnout		93,056	93.71	▲1.33
Registered electors		99,300		▼17.96
PAP hold		Swing	▲11.91	

=== Elections in 2020s ===
General Election 2020
Party	Candidate	Votes	%	±%
PAP	Foo Mee Har Desmond Lee Ang Wei Neng Rachel Ong S. Iswaran	71,658	51.68	▼26.89
PSP	Tan Cheng Bock Leong Mun Wai Hazel Poa Nadarajah Loganathan Jeffrey Khoo	66,996	48.32	N/A
Majority		4,662	3.36	▼53.74
Total valid votes		138,654	98.83	▲1.43
Rejected ballots		1,646	1.17	▼1.43
Turnout		140,300	96.04	▲2.33
Registered electors		146,089		▲47.11
PAP hold		Swing	▼26.89	
