= Pioneer Single Member Constituency =

Electoral division in Singapore

Coordinates: 1.338°N 103.701°E

Pioneer
- Single-member constituency for the Parliament of Singapore
- Region: West Region, Singapore
- Electorate: 25,207

Current constituency
- Created: 2011; 15 years ago
- Seats: 1
- Party: People's Action Party
- Member: Patrick Tay
- Town Council: West Coast–Jurong West
- Created from: Hong Kah GRC; West Coast GRC

The Pioneer Single Member Constituency (Note: Malay: Kawasan Undi Perseorangan Pioneer; Chinese: 先驱单选区; Tamil: பயனியர் தனித்தொகுதி) is a single-member constituency (SMC) situated in western Singapore. It is managed by West Coast–Jurong West Town Council (WCTC). The current Member of Parliament (MP) for the constituency is Patrick Tay from the People's Action Party (PAP).

== History ==
=== Creation and NSP contests ===
Prior to the 2011 general election, Pioneer SMC was carved out of West Coast Group Representation Constituency (GRC), which it had previously belonged to as a division; it also included part of Hong Kah GRC. Cedric Foo, the incumbent PAP MP for the division, defeated Steve Chia from the National Solidarity Party (NSP) with 60.73% of the vote.

During the 2015 general election, Foo stood for reelection, defeating Elvin Ong from the NSP with an improved 76.35% of the vote.

=== PSP contests ===
Prior to the 2020 general election, Foo retired from politics; Patrick Tay, the incumbent MP for the Boon Lay division of West Coast GRC, was redeployed to retain Pioneer SMC for the PAP. He defeated Lim Cher Hong from the Progress Singapore Party (PSP) and independent candidate Cheang Peng Wah with 62% of the vote.

During the 2025 general election, Tay stood for reelection. He defeated Stephanie Tan, a PSP newcomer, with 65.45% of the vote.

== Members of Parliament ==
Interactive map of Pioneer SMC as of the 2025 general election

Year	Member	Party
Formation
2011	Cedric Foo	PAP
2015	Cedric Foo	PAP
2020	Patrick Tay	PAP
2025	Patrick Tay	PAP

== Electoral results ==
Note: The Elections Department does not include rejected votes when calculating the vote shares of candidates. Hence, all candidates' vote shares will total to 100% at any given election (may not appear so in multi-way contests due to rounding).

=== Elections in 2010s ===
General Election 2011: Pioneer
Party	Candidate	Votes	%
PAP	Cedric Foo	14,593	60.73
NSP	Steve Chia	9,437	39.27
Majority		5,156	21.36
Registered electors			
Total valid votes			
Rejected ballots			
Turnout		24,476	95.1
PAP win (new seat)			

General Election 2015: Pioneer
Party	Candidate	Votes	%	±%
PAP	Cedric Foo	17,994	76.34	▲15.61
NSP	Elvin Ong	5,578	23.66	▼15.61
Majority		12,416	52.68	▲31.22
Registered electors		25,458		
Total valid votes				
Rejected ballots		658	2.72	▲0.90
Turnout		24,230	95.18	▲0.08
PAP hold		Swing	▲15.61	

=== Elections in 2020s ===
General Election 2020
Party	Candidate	Votes	%	±%
PAP	Patrick Tay	14,593	62.00	▼14.34
PSP	Lim Cher Hong	8,289	35.22	N/A
Independent	Cheang Peng Wah	655	2.78	N/A
Majority		6,304	26.78	
Total valid votes		23,537	98.53	
Rejected ballots		350	1.47	
Turnout		23,887	96.89	▲1.71
Registered electors		24,653		
PAP hold		Swing	▼14.34	

General Election 2025
Party	Candidate	Votes	%	±%
PAP	Patrick Tay	15,360	65.45	▲3.45
PSP	Stephanie Tan	8,110	34.55	▼0.67
Majority		7,250	30.90	▲4.12
Total valid votes		23,470	99.02	▲0.49
Rejected ballots		233	0.98	▼0.49
Turnout		23,703	94.03	▼2.86
Registered electors		25,207		▲2.25
PAP hold		Swing	▲3.45	
