= Fatimah Lateef =

Singaporean politician

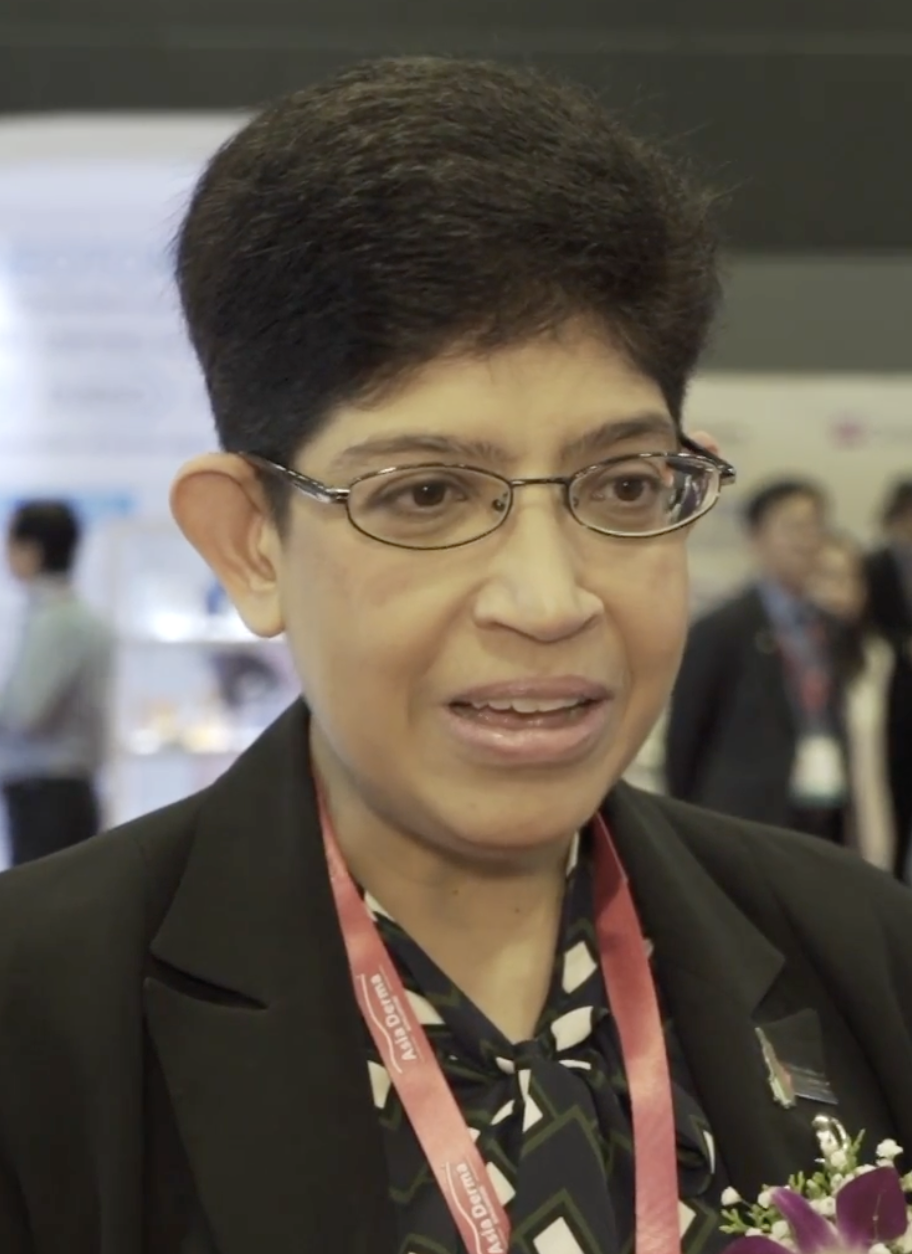
- Fatimah in 2018

Member of Parliament for Marine Parade GRC (Geylang Serai)
- In office 27 April 2006 – 23 June 2020
- Preceded by: Othman Haron Eusofe
- Succeeded by: Fahmi Aliman

Personal details
- Born: Fatimah binte Abdul Lateef; 16 March 1966 (age 60) Singapore
- Party: People's Action Party
- Education: National University of Singapore

Fatimah binte Abdul Lateef (born 16 March 1966) is a Singaporean doctor specializing in emergency medicine and a former politician. A member of the governing People's Action Party (PAP), she was the Member of Parliament (MP) representing the Geylang Serai ward of Marine Parade Group Representation Constituency between 2006 and 2020.

== Education ==
Fatimah had her early education at CHIJ Opera Estate (now CHIJ (Katong) Primary), CHIJ Katong Convent and Temasek Junior College. She then enrolled at the National University of Singapore, where she completed her Bachelor of Medicine and Bachelor of Surgery (MBBS) at the Faculty of Medicine. She subsequently obtained an FRCS (A&E) from the Royal Infirmary of Edinburgh as well as sub-specialisations in Emergency Cardiovascular and Neurovascular care and Prehospital care Medicine from the Medical College of Virginia and the University of Cincinnati.

== Career ==
Fatimah is currently a senior consultant in the Department of Emergency Medicine at Singapore General Hospital.

=== Political career ===
Fatimah was first elected to parliament at the 2006 general election as an MP for Marine Parade GRC. She had been representing the ward of Geylang Serai until 2020, where she was replaced by her successor, Fahmi Aliman.

Parliament of Singapore
Preceded by Othman Haron Eusofe	Member of Parliament for Marine Parade GRC (Geylang Serai); 2006 – 2020	Succeeded by Fahmi Aliman
