= Ho Geok Choo =

Singaporean politician (born 1956)

- 何玉珠

Member of Parliament for West Coast GRC (Boon Lay)
- In office 3 November 2001 – 18 April 2011
- Preceded by: Goh Chee Wee (Boon Lay SMC)
- Succeeded by: Lawrence Wong

Personal details
- Born: Madeleine Ho Geok Choo; 15 April 1956 (age 70) Colony of Singapore
- Party: People's Action Party
- Education: National University of Singapore (MSc)

Madeleine Ho Geok Choo (Note: Chinese: 何玉珠; Pe̍h-ōe-jī: Hô Gio̍k-chu; pinyin: Hé Yùzhū) (born 15 April 1956) is a Singaporean former politician. A former member of the governing People's Action Party (PAP), she was the Member of Parliament (MP) serving the Boon Lay division of West Coast Group Representation Constituency between 2001 and 2011. She is currently the chief executive officer of Human Capital Singapore.

== Personal life ==
Ho's father, Ho See Beng, was a former PAP Member of Parliament.

Ho graduated from the National University of Singapore with a Master of Science degree in human resource management.
