= Cedric Foo =

Singaporean politician

- 符致鏡

Minister of State for National Development
- In office 12 August 2004 – 30 April 2005
- Minister: Mah Bow Tan

Minister of State for Defence
- In office 1 April 2002 – 30 April 2005
- Minister: Tony Tan; Teo Chee Hean

Member of the Singapore Parliament for Pioneer SMC
- In office 7 May 2011 – 23 June 2020
- Preceded by: Himself (West Coast GRC – Pioneer)
- Succeeded by: Patrick Tay

Member of the Singapore Parliament for West Coast GRC (Pioneer)
- In office 25 October 2001 – 19 April 2011
- Preceded by: Constituency established
- Succeeded by: Himself (Pioneer SMC)

Personal details
- Born: Cedric Foo Chee Keng; 16 July 1960 (age 66) State of Singapore
- Party: People's Action Party
- Children: 4
- Education: University of Michigan (BS); Massachusetts Institute of Technology (MS)

Cedric Foo Chee Keng (Note: Chinese: 符致镜; Jyutping: Fu^{4} Zi^{3} Geng^{3}; pinyin: Fú Zhìjìng) (born 16 July 1960) is a Singaporean business executive and former politician. A member of the governing People's Action Party (PAP), he was the Member of Parliament (MP) representing the Pioneer division of West Coast Group Representation Constituency between 2001 and 2011, and Pioneer Single Member Constituency between 2011 and 2020.

== Early life and education ==
Born on 16 July 1960 in British Singapore, Foo attended Kim Seng East Primary School and Tanglin Technical School before graduating from Singapore Polytechnic in 1980.

He subsequently went on to complete a bachelor's degree in naval architecture and marine engineering at the University of Michigan in 1984 and a Master of Science degree in ocean systems management at the Massachusetts Institute of Technology in 1985.

== Career ==
Upon graduation from MIT, Foo began his career at shipping firm Neptune Orient Lines Limited (NOL), holding various executive positions, including president, NOL U.S.A. (1993–1995), and executive vice-president (finance) (1995–1999). Foo left NOL to take up the post of senior vice-president (finance and admin) at Singapore Airlines, which he held from 2000 to 2001, before subsequently assuming the position of senior vice-president (West Asia/Africa) from 2001 to 2002.

In 2002, Foo left Singapore Airlines

Foo returned to the private sector and NOL in May 2005 as group deputy president, subsequently assuming the additional portfolio of chief financial officer.

Foo has also held positions on various government statutory boards. From 2003 to 2006, Foo was the chairman of SPRING Singapore, and was the chairman of JTC Corporation from 2008 to 2013.

Since July 2017, Foo has been the chief financial officer of Singapore Technologies Engineering.

=== Political career ===
Foo entered politics in 2001, as an elected Member of Parliament for the West Coast Group Representative Constituency, Pioneer Division. In 2002, he was appointed Singapore's Minister of State in the Ministry of Defence and, additionally from 2004, in the Ministry of National Development.

He was re-elected in 2006 for a second parliamentary term. In the May 2011 general elections, Pioneer Division was re-designated a single-member constituency. Foo was nominated as the PAP candidate for Pioneer SMC, and returned as an elected Member of Parliament for a third term, winning 60.73% of the total votes cast. Foo continued to be the MP for Pioneer SMC, having won the 2015 general elections with 76.34% of the vote. In 2020, Foo did not stand for the 2020 Singaporean general election.

He was previously the chairman of the Public Accounts Committee as well as the chairman of the Government Parliamentary Committee (GPC) for Transport. He also was the deputy chairman of the GPC for Finance and Trade & Industry, and a member of the GPC for Defence & Foreign Affairs.

== Personal life ==
Foo is married with four children.

== See also ==
- List of Singapore MPs
- List of current Singapore MPs

== Notes ==
Parliament of Singapore
| New constituency | Member of Parliament for West Coast GRC (Pioneer); 2001–2011 | Succeeded by Himself as MP for Pioneer SMC |
| Preceded by Himself as MP for West Coast GRC (Pioneer) | Member of Parliament for Pioneer SMC; 2011–2020 | Succeeded by Patrick Tay |
