= Foo Mee Har =

Singaporean politician (born 1966)

- 胡美霞
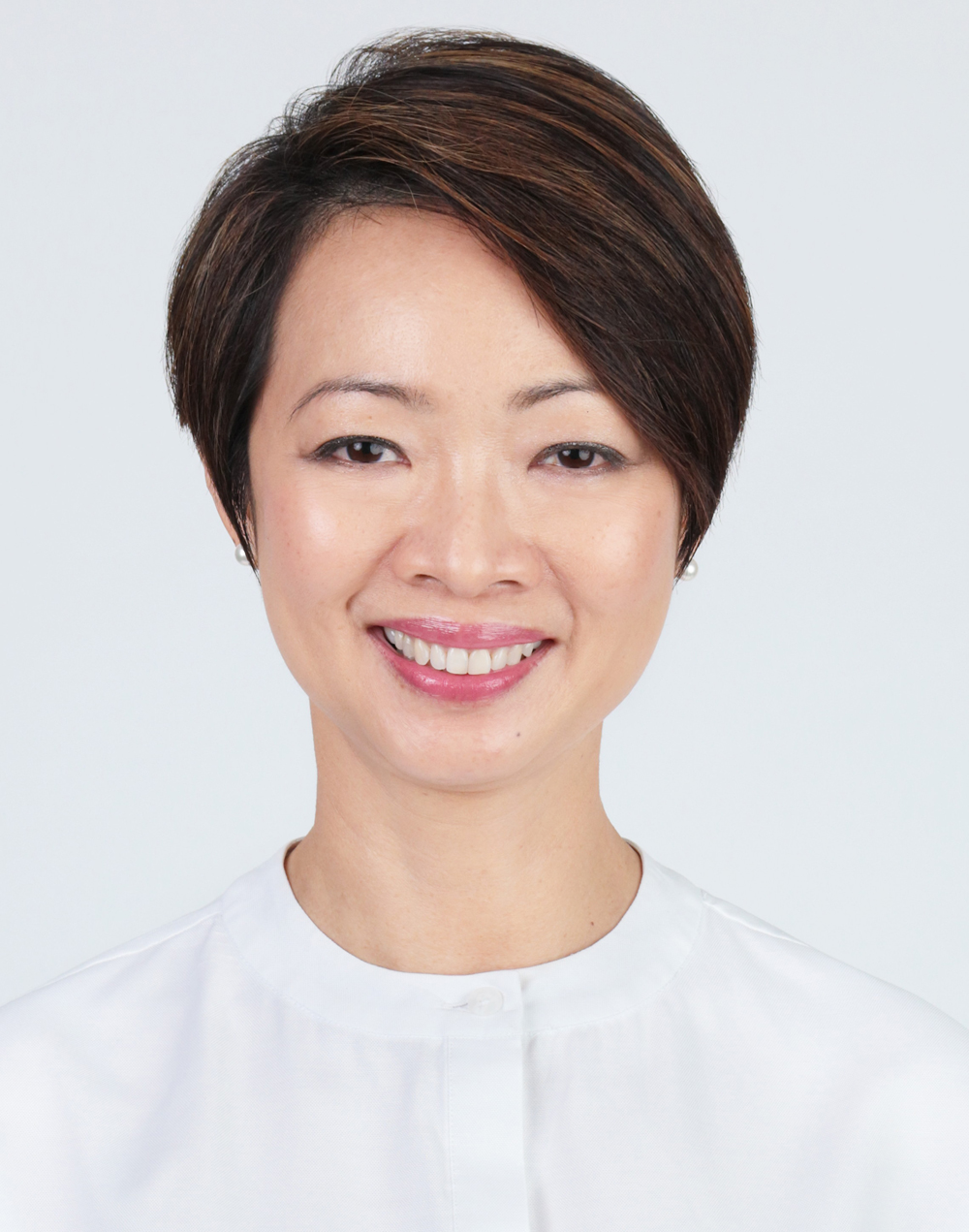
- Official portrait, 2021

Member of Parliament for West Coast GRC (Ayer Rajah–Gek Poh)
- In office 7 May 2011 – 15 April 2025
- Preceded by: Constituency established
- Succeeded by: Constituency abolished
- Majority: 4,662 (3.36%)

Personal details
- Born: 10 January 1966 (age 60) Ipoh, Malaysia
- Party: People's Action Party
- Education: University of New South Wales (BS)
- Occupation: Politician; businesswoman

Foo Mee Har (Chinese: 胡美霞; pinyin: Hú Měixiá; born 10 January 1966) is a Malaysian-born Singaporean business executive and politician. A member of the People's Action Party (PAP), she served as a Member of Parliament (MP) for the Ayer Rajah division from 2011 to 2020, and from 2020 to 2025 she represented the Ayer Rajah–Gek Poh division in the West Coast Group Representation Constituency.

Foo entered politics at the 2011 general election as part of a five-member PAP team contesting West Coast Group Representation Constituency, which received 66.6% of the vote.She was re-elected in the 2015 general election, with the PAP team receiving 78.6% of the vote against the Reform Party. In the 2020 general election, she retained her seat in West Coast GRC with 51.68% of the vote. She did not stand in the 2025 general election and ceased to be an MP.

In 2015, Foo was appointed chief executive officer of the Wealth Management Institute, a Singapore-based institute focused on education and research in wealth and asset management. She was also appointed a council member of the Singapore Business Federation in 2018.

== Education ==
Foo attended Ave Maria Convent School (1973–1982) in Ipoh, in the state of Perak, Malaysia, and later studied at Loreto Normanhurst (1983–1985) in Sydney, Australia. She graduated in 1989 from the University of New South Wales with a Bachelor of Science degree, earning first-class honours in psychology.

== Career ==
Foo began her career in 1990 as a management consultant with Coopers & Lybrand Management Consultants (now part of PricewaterhouseCoopers) and PA Consulting Group. She later joined Jardine Matheson's shipping group as the head of human resources.

From 1994 to 2012, Foo worked at Standard Chartered Bank. Between 2003 and 2005, she served as the Country Head of Consumer Banking in China, overseeing the expansion of the bank's consumer banking operations in the country. From 2006 to 2008, she was President and Chief Executive Officer of Standard Chartered Bank (Thai) Public Company Limited, responsible for the bank's overall operations in Thailand. In 2008, Foo was appointed Global Head for the Priority & International Banking business, managing banking, financing, and wealth management services for affluent and international client segments across more than 30 countries in Asia, Africa, and the Middle East. She also supported various corporate community programmes, including advocacy, outreach, and fundraising for causes such as preventable blindness, HIV/AIDS, and public health. She initiated the Standard Chartered Bangkok Marathon, an annual event in Thailand.

In March 2011, Foo was profiled in The Straits Times' Women at the Top series, which featured prominent women in Singapore.

In 2015, Foo became chief executive officer of the Wealth Management Institute, a Singapore-based institute specializing in wealth and asset management education and research.

== Political career ==
Foo joined the People's Action Party (PAP) in 2010 and was introduced as one of the party's candidates for the 2011 Singaporean general election. She was elected as a Member of Parliamenr representing the Ayer Rajah division within the West Coast Group Representation Constituency (GRC), after the PAP team won 66.6% of the vote. She was re-elected in the 2015 Singaporean general election, when the PAP team received 78.6% of the vote against the Reform Party. In the 2020 Singaporean general election, the PAP retained West Coast GRC with 51.68% of the vote, and Foo continued to serve as MP for the Ayer Rajah–Gek Poh division. Constituency boundaries were changed for the 2025 general election and she did not stand for re-election.

Following her election to parliament, Foo was appointed Deputy Chairperson of the Finance, Trade and Industry Government Parliamentary Committee (GPC) in the Parliament of Singapore. She also served as Treasurer of the PAP Women's Wing Executive Committee and is a member of its Advocacy Subcommittee. In 2011, she contributed to a position paper on flexible-work legislation. As Chairperson of the Estimates Committee in Parliament, Foo has spoken on issues related to fiscal sustainability, encouraging responsible public spending and long-term financial planning. She has also supported initiatives aimed at strengthening small and medium-sized enterprises (SMEs) through innovation and productivity improvements.

Foo has raised topics in Parliament relating to employment and skills development, including workforce adaptation to automation, machine learning and robotics. She has also commented on retirement adequacy, suggesting measures to enhance the Central Provident Fund (CPF) framework and improve financial literacy among Singaporeans. In the area of education, Foo has spoken on the need to align education policy with future industry needs and has supported efforts to promote lifelong learning. She has also backed policies that expand flexible work arrangements, extend labour protections under the Employment Act, and improve work–life balance for families and older workers.

== Personal life ==
After graduating in 1989, Foo moved to Singapore as a permanent resident and married a Singaporean. The couple have two sons. Foo became a Singapore citizen in January 2008 following overseas assignments between 2003 and 2008, during which she became eligible for citizenship. In a 2008 interview with The Straits Times, Foo described her overseas postings as family decisions, noting that her husband, then a general manager at a multinational company, relocated with her when she accepted positions in China and later in Thailand.

Parliament of Singapore
New constituency	Member of Parliament for West Coast GRC (Ayer Rajah - Gek Poh Division); 2011 – 2025	Constituency abolished
