= S. Iswaran =

Singaporean former politician (born 1962)

- எஸ். ஈஸ்வரன்
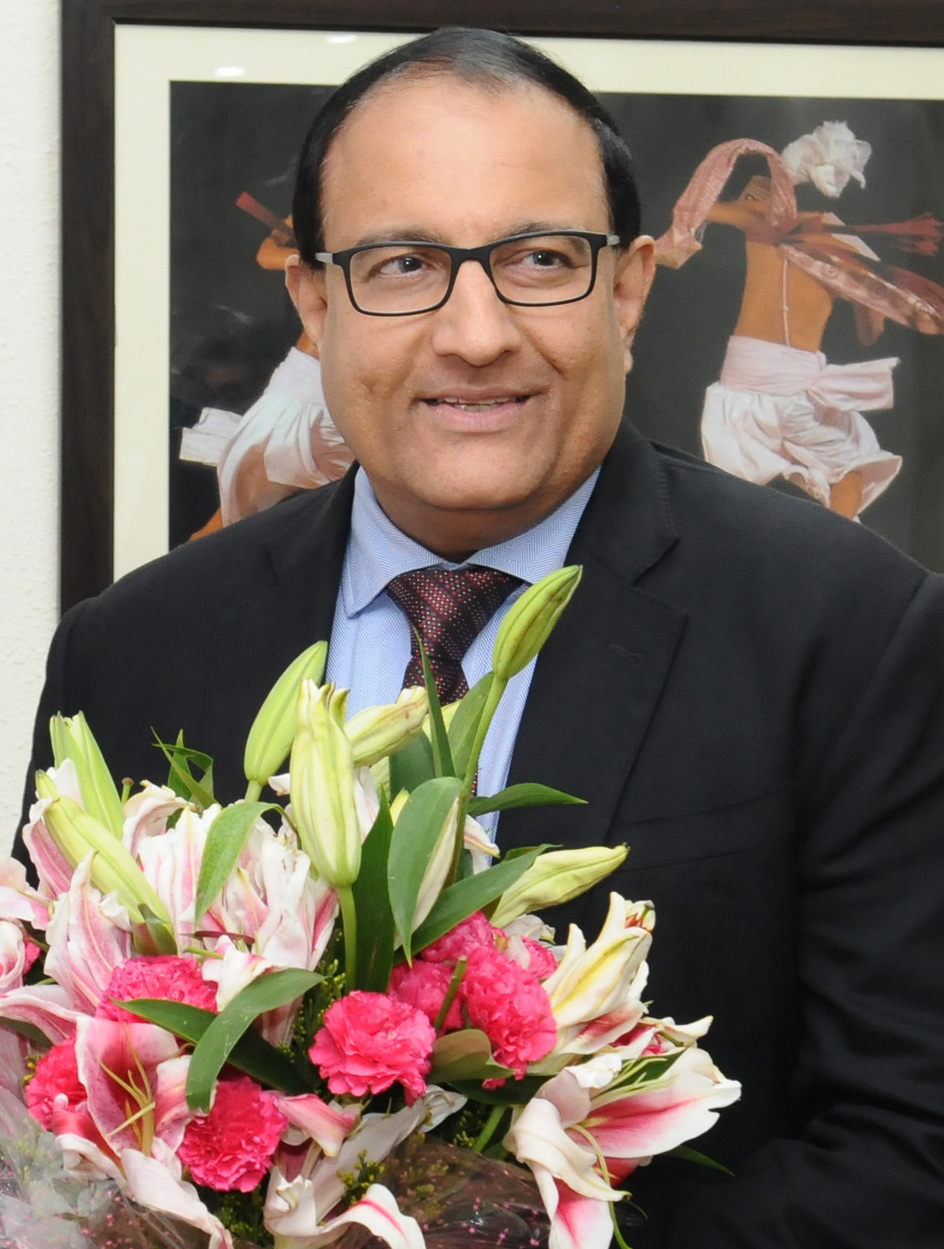
- Iswaran in 2016

Minister for Transport
- In office 15 May 2021 – 18 January 2024
- Prime Minister: Lee Hsien Loong
- Preceded by: Ong Ye Kung
- Succeeded by: Chee Hong Tat

Minister for Communications and Information
- In office 1 May 2018 – 14 May 2021
- Prime Minister: Lee Hsien Loong
- Preceded by: Yaacob Ibrahim
- Succeeded by: Josephine Teo (As Minister for Digital Development and Information)

Minister for Trade and Industry (Industry)
- In office 1 October 2015 – 30 April 2018 Serving with Lim Hng Kiang (Trade)
- Prime Minister: Lee Hsien Loong
- Preceded by: Lim Hng Kiang
- Succeeded by: Chan Chun Sing (as Minister for Trade and Industry)

Minister in the Prime Minister's Office
- In office 21 May 2011 – 30 September 2015
- Prime Minister: Lee Hsien Loong
- Preceded by: Lim Hwee Hua
- Succeeded by: Desmond Lee; Josephine Teo

Second Minister for Home Affairs
- In office 21 May 2011 – 30 September 2015 Serving with Masagos Zulkifli
- Prime Minister: Lee Hsien Loong
- Minister: Teo Chee Hean
- Preceded by: K. Shanmugam
- Succeeded by: Desmond Lee (2017)

Second Minister for Trade and Industry
- In office 21 May 2011 – 30 September 2015
- Prime Minister: Lee Hsien Loong
- Minister: Lim Hng Kiang

Member of the Singapore Parliament for West Coast GRC
- In office 2 January 1997 – 16 January 2024
- Preceded by: Constituency established
- Succeeded by: Vacant, constituency later abolished

Personal details
- Born: Subramaniam Iswaran; 14 June 1962 (age 64) Madras, Tamil Nadu, India
- Citizenship: Singapore
- Other political affiliations: People's Action Party (1997–2024)
- Spouse: Kay Mary Taylor
- Children: 3
- Education: National Junior College University of Adelaide (BEc); Harvard University (MPA)
- Criminal information
- Status: Released
- Convictions: Obtaining valuable items as a public servant under Section 165 of the Penal Code (4 counts); Obstruction of justice under Section 204A(a) of the Penal Code
- Penalty: 12 months of imprisonment

Details
- Date apprehended: 11 July 2023
- Imprisoned at: Changi Prison

Subramaniam Iswaran (Note: Tamil: சுப்பிரமணியம் ஈஸ்வரன், romanized: Cuppiramaṇiyam Īsvaraṉ) (born 14 June 1962) is a Singaporean former politician. He last served as the Minister for Transport from 2021 until 2024, when he was charged with corruption. A former member of the governing People's Action Party (PAP), he was the Member of Parliament (MP) for the Pasir Panjang division of West Coast Group Representation Constituency (GRC) between 1997 and 2001, and the West Coast division of the same constituency between 2001 and 2024.

In 2023, Iswaran was arrested by the Corrupt Practices Investigation Bureau (CPIB) in connection with a case that was not publicly disclosed at the time, and was instructed to take a leave of absence by Prime Minister Lee Hsien Loong. His transport portfolio was succeeded by Chee Hong Tat, initially in an acting position. In January 2024, Iswaran resigned as Minister for Transport as well as from his positions as an MP and member of the PAP, two days before pleading not guilty to 27 counts of corruption and obstruction of justice relating to his dealings with Malaysian billionaire Ong Beng Seng.

In September 2024, Iswaran pleaded guilty to four counts under Section 165 of the Penal Code, relating to "obtaining gratification as a public servant" and one count of obstruction of justice under Section 204A(a). He voluntarily returned more than S$384,000 in bribes and was sentenced to 12 months' imprisonment. He completed his sentence in June 2025 and has since kept a low profile. Iswaran was the first Singaporean minister to be imprisoned since Wee Toon Boon in 1975.

== Early life and education ==
Iswaran was born on 14 June 1962 in Chennai, India, and later moved to Singapore as a child. Iswaran attended Saint Andrew's School and National Junior College before graduating from the University of Adelaide with first class honours, where he read economics, which was provided for by a Colombo Plan scholarship. He also holds a Master of Public Administration from Harvard University.

== Career ==
Prior to entering politics, Iswaran was Senior Vice President and managing director at Temasek Holdings (2003–2006), Director for International Trade at the Ministry of Trade and Industry (MTI), chief executive officer of the Singapore Indian Development Association (SINDA), and Director of Strategic Development at Singapore Technologies (1996–1998).

Throughout his political career, Iswaran concurrently held directorships in several organisations, including Quintiles Transnational, Sunningdale Tech, Shin Corporation, SciGen, PSA International, Sembcorp Industries, and Hyflux.

=== Political career ===
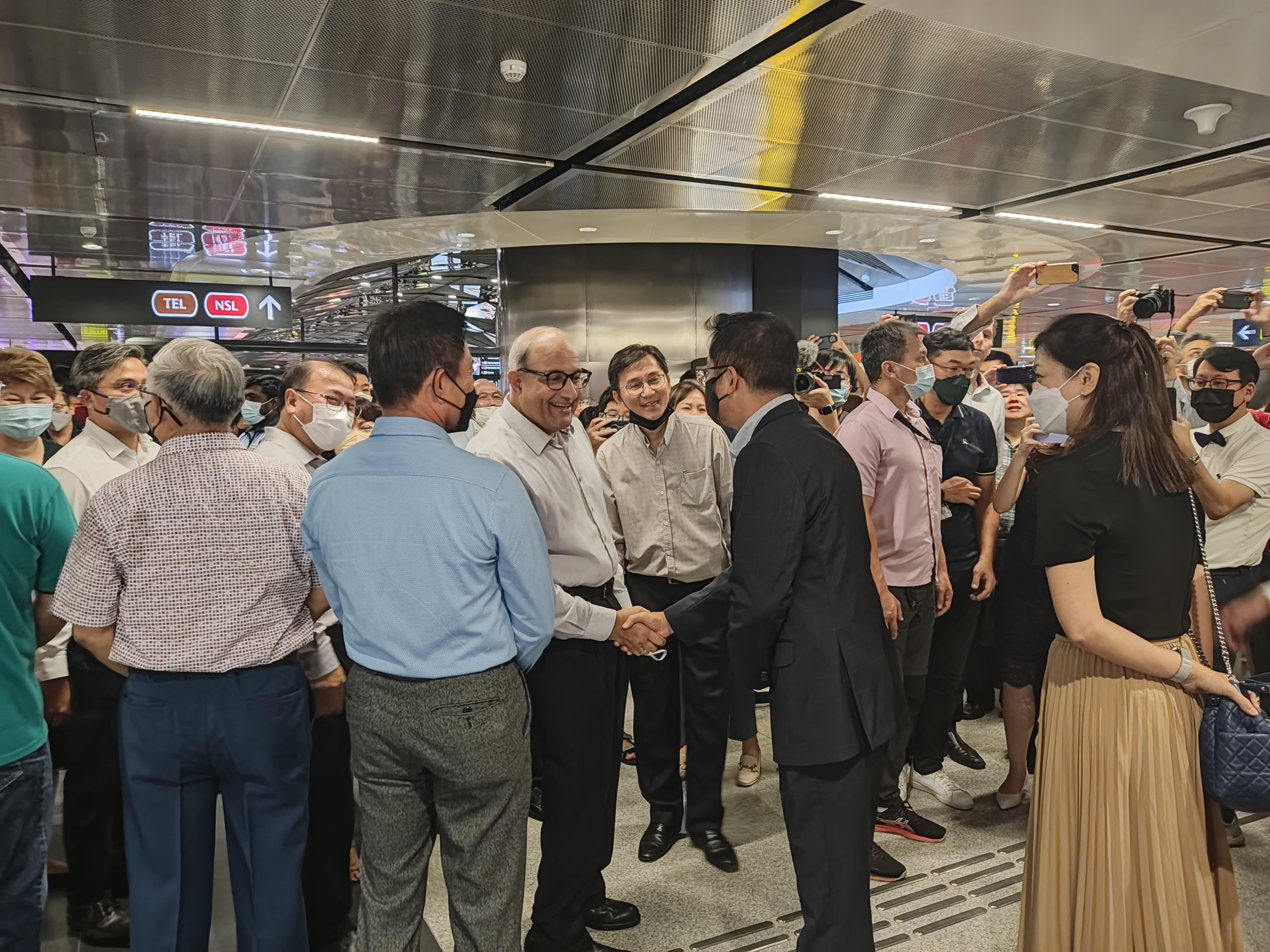
Iswaran visiting Orchard MRT station during the Thomson–East Coast line open house, 2022.

Iswaran made his political debut in the 1997 general election when he contested as part of a four-member People's Action Party (PAP) team in West Coast GRC and won with 70.14% of the vote, becoming a Member of Parliament.

From 2004 to 2006, Iswaran was Deputy Speaker of Parliament. On 1 July 2006, he was appointed Minister of State at the Ministry of Trade and Industry.

After the 2006 general election, on 1 April 2008, Iswaran was promoted to Senior Minister of State at the Ministry of Trade and Industry. On 1 April 2009, he was given an additional appointment as Senior Minister of State at the Ministry of Education.

Following the 2011 general election, Iswaran was promoted to full Minister in the Cabinet and appointed Minister in the Prime Minister's Office, Second Minister for Home Affairs, and Second Minister for Trade and Industry. After the 2015 general election, on 1 October 2015, he relinquished his three positions and took up the portfolio of Minister for Trade and Industry (Industry) alongside Lim Hng Kiang, who was Minister for Trade and Industry (Trade). On 1 May 2018, he became Minister for Communications and Information, however he did continue in the Ministry of Trade and Industry as Minister In-Charge of Trade Relations.

After the 2020 general election, Iswaran continued as Minister in the Ministry of Communications and Information. On 15 May 2021, after a Cabinet reshuffle, Iswaran became Minister for Transport while continuing his appointment as Minister-in-charge of Trade Relations.

== Prosecution and conviction ==
=== 2023 ===
On 11 July 2023, Iswaran was arrested and released on bail. He also had his passport impounded. The next day, he and other individuals were summoned to assist in an unspecified corruption investigation by the Corrupt Practices Investigation Bureau (CPIB). Upon being briefed on the investigation by the CPIB, Prime Minister Lee Hsien Loong instructed Iswaran to go on a leave of absence until the end of the investigations; Chee Hong Tat was appointed as the Acting Minister for Transport.

Iswaran's case was the first high-profile graft investigation involving a minister since November 1986. In the previous investigation, Minister for National Development Teh Cheang Wan was investigated by the CPIB for bribery allegations; however, he committed suicide a month later before he could be formally charged. The next day, the government announced that Iswaran would not have access to government offices and had to remain in Singapore until the investigations were completed.

On 2 August, Lee announced that Iswaran had been interdicted with a reduced monthly pay of $8,500 per civil service guidelines, as there were no specific provisions covering ministers under investigation. Until his resignation, Iswaran drew a monthly salary of $16,000 as an MP as Parliament had not tabled a motion to remove it.

=== 2024 ===
On 9 January 2024, investigations by the CPIB against Iswaran were completed and put under review by the Attorney-General's Chambers (AGC). In a written reply to non-constituency MP (NCMP) Hazel Poa, Minister for Education Chan Chun Sing said that the CPIB had completed a "robust and thorough" investigation and assured that the case "[would] be put through the due legal process".

On 18 January, Iswaran was charged in the State Courts of Singapore with 27 charges relating to bribery and corruption. The CPIB alleged that Iswaran had obtained kickbacks valued at S$384,340.98 from property tycoon Ong Beng Seng, in part to advance Ong's business interests. Iswaran subsequently resigned as a member of the PAP, Minister for Transport and MP for West Coast GRC. He was defended by Senior Counsel Davinder Singh.

On 25 March, Iswaran was handed 8 new charges over obtaining $19k in items including a Brompton bicycle and golf clubs from Lum Kok Seng, the managing director at Lum Chang Building Contractors. There had been a contract between the company and the Land Transport Authority (LTA) for addition and alteration works to Tanah Merah MRT station and existing viaducts.

On 25 September, Iswaran pleaded guilty to 4 charges under Section 165 of the Penal Code 1871 for receiving gifts while in office as well as 1 charge of obstruction of justice. He was convicted of all 5 charges on the same day. The sentencing hearing was scheduled for 3 October. The prosecution sought a custodial sentence of 6 to 7 months whereas the defence contended that no more than 8 weeks' imprisonment should be imposed. On 3 October, Iswaran was sentenced to 12 months in prison, a term higher than the requested sentencing by both the prosecution and the defence.

=== 2025 ===
On 7 February 2025, after serving four months in prison, Iswaran was transferred to the home detention scheme to continue the rest of his sentence in the community. Having become eligible for parole by serving his sentence with good behaviour after two-thirds of his stipulated jail term (equivalent to eight months), he was allowed to transition to the home detention scheme halfway through his reduced sentence. The decision was made after the prison authorities took into consideration Iswaran's low propensity to re-offend, his strong familial support and his lack of institutional offences in prison. On 6 June 2025, it was reported that Iswaran had completed his sentence.

== Personal life ==
Iswaran is married to Kay Mary Taylor, an Australian citizen. They have a daughter, Monisha Catherine Iswaran, an Australian citizen, and two sons. Monisha previously held Singaporean citizenship by virtue of her father being Singaporean but was deprived of it in 2025 under Article 135(1)(b) of the Constitution. The Article provides that a person ceases to be a citizen of Singapore if they acquire the citizenship of another country after the Constitution came into force, or if, before that time, they applied for citizenship of another country and no other condition for the acquisition of Singapore citizenship was specified.

== Notes ==
Political offices
Preceded by Ong Ye Kung	Minister for Transport; 2021 – 2024	Succeeded by Chee Hong Tat
New office	Minister-in-charge of Trade Relations; 2018 – 2024	Succeeded by Grace Fu
Preceded by Yaacob Ibrahim	Minister for Communications and Information; 2018 – 2021	Succeeded by Josephine Teo
Preceded by Lim Hng Kiang as Minister for Trade and Industry	Minister for Trade and Industry (Industry); 2015 – 2018; Served alongside: Lim Hng Kiang (Trade)	Succeeded by Chan Chun Sing as Minister for Trade and Industry
Parliament of Singapore
Preceded by Abbas Abu Amin as MP for Pasir Panjang GRC (Pasir Panjang)	Member of Parliament for West Coast GRC (Pasir Panjang); 1997 – 2001	Constituency abolished
Preceded by Wan Soon Bee as MP for West Coast GRC (West Coast)	Member of Parliament for West Coast GRC (West Coast); 2001 – 2024	Constituency abolished
