= Vikram Nair =

Singaporean politician

The Honourable Vikram Nair
- വിക്രം നായർ
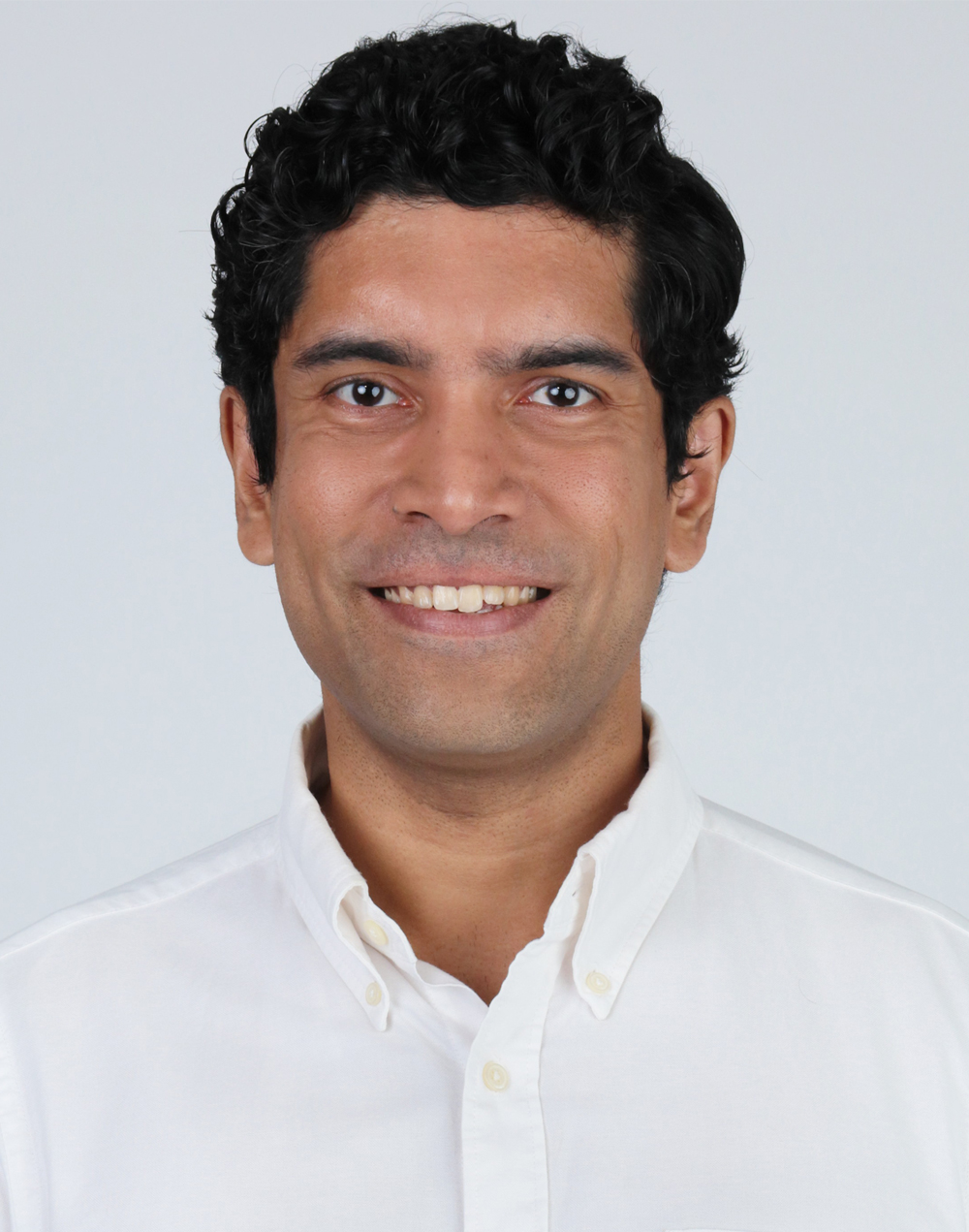
- Official portrait, 2021

Member of Parliament for Sembawang GRC
- Incumbent
- Assumed office 7 May 2011
- Preceded by: PAP held
- Majority: 2011: 36,647 (27.80%); 2015: 59,572 (44.56%); 2020: 48,398 (34.58%); 2025: 47,002 (37.84%)

Personal details
- Born: 18 July 1978 (age 48) Singapore
- Party: People's Action Party
- Spouse: Faye Ong (m. 2015)
- Children: 1
- Education: Trinity College, Cambridge (MA)
- Occupation: Politician
- Profession: Lawyer

Vikram Nair (Note: Malayalam: വിക്രം നായർ, romanized: Vikram Nāyar) (born 18 July 1978) is a Singaporean politician and lawyer. A member of the governing People's Action Party (PAP), he has been the Member of Parliament (MP) representing the Admiralty division of Sembawang Group Representation Constituency since 2011.

== Education ==
Nair is of Malayalee descent. He was educated at Anglo-Chinese School (Independent) and Raffles Junior College before graduating from the Trinity College of the University of Cambridge in 2002 with a Bachelor of Arts degree (later promoted to Master of Arts by seniority) under the Jardine Foundation Scholarship, where he read law.

He was awarded the college's Lizette Bentwich Prize for Law in 2002. He served as Director of Debating at the Cambridge Union Society between 2001 and 2002, and was ranked the No. 3 individual speaker at the 2002 World Universities Debating Championship in Toronto, Canada.

Upon his return to Singapore, Nair completed a graduate diploma in Singapore Law at the NUS Faculty of Law in 2005.

== Career ==
From 2002 to 2004, Nair worked as a management consultant at McKinsey & Company. He then joined the law firm Allen & Gledhill in 2005, where he worked in the Dispute Resolution Department. From 2008 to 2014, Nair worked at the law firm Norton Rose, and since 2014 he has been with Rajah & Tann.

From 2010 to 2011, Nair was the vice-chairman of Singapore's Malayalam Language Education Society. He is currently the chairman of the Tamil Language Learning and Promotion Committee, and has served on the committees of various other non-profit societies in Singapore.

=== Political career ===
Nair was elected into Parliament as an MP for Sembawang GRC at the 2011 general election. He was part of the PAP team led by the Minister for Health, Khaw Boon Wan, which defeated the team from the Singapore Democratic Party by 84,252 votes (63.9%) to 47,605 (36.1%). Since the election, Nair has represented the Admiralty ward of Sembawang GRC.

Nair was re-elected as an MP at the 2015 general election, when the PAP team in Sembawang defeated the team from the National Solidarity Party by 96,639 votes (72.3%) to 37,067 (27.7%). Within Parliament, Nair has served as a member of the Government Parliamentary Committees for Trade & Industry and Finance, Law and Home Affairs, and Communications and Information.

He was then appointed Chairperson of Defence and Foreign Affairs Government Parliamentary Committee (GPC) in the 14th Parliament of Singapore.

Nair is appointed as Chairperson of Sembawang Town Council (SBTC) since 2020.Nair is part of the Government Parliamentary Committee under Defence and Foreign Affairs where he serves as deputy chairman and Home Affairs and Law where he serves as chairman since 2025.

== Personal life ==
Nair divorced from Faye Ong in July 2026.

== Notes ==
Parliament of Singapore
| Preceded by Maliki Osman; Lim Wee Kiak; K. Shanmugam; Hawazi Daipi; Khaw Boon Wan; Ellen Lee | Member of Parliament for Sembawang GRC; 2011–present Served alongside: (2011-2015): Hawazi Daipi, Khaw Boon Wan, Ellen Lee, Ong Teng Koon (2015-2020): Lim Wee Kiak, Ong Ye Kung, Khaw Boon Wan, Amrin Amin (2020-2025): Lim Wee Kiak, Ong Ye Kung, Poh Li San, Mariam Jaafar (2025-present): Gabriel Lam, Ng Shi Xuan, Ong Ye Kung, Mariam Jaafar | Incumbent |
