= Mariam Jaafar =

Singaporean politician (born 1977)

The Honourable Mariam Jaafar
- مريم جعفر
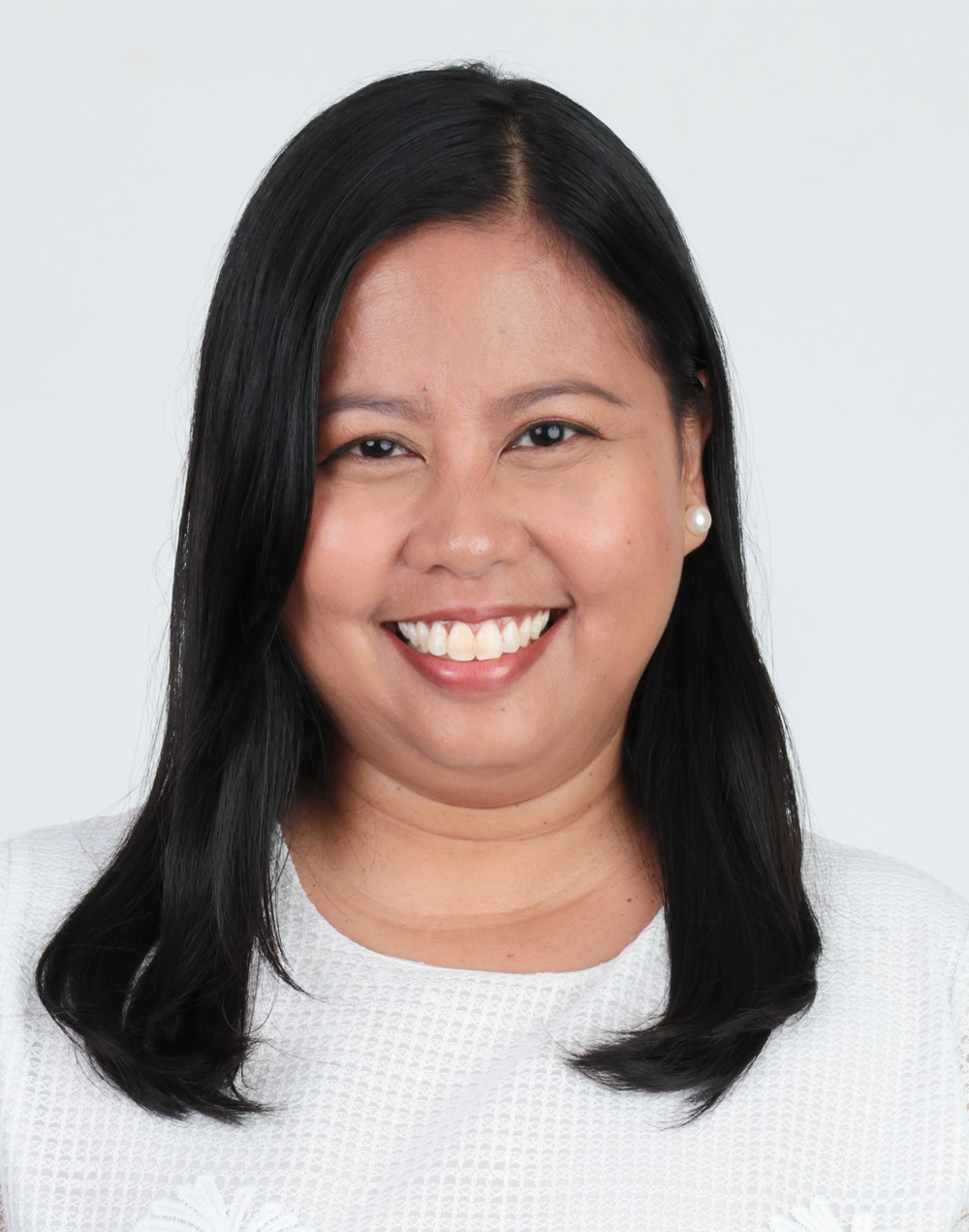
- Official portrait, 2021

Member of Parliament for Sembawang GRC
- Incumbent
- Assumed office 10 July 2020
- Preceded by: PAP held
- Majority: 2020: 48,398 (34.58%); 2025: 47,002 (37.84%)

Personal details
- Born: Mariam binte Jaafar; 8 February 1977 (age 49) Singapore
- Party: People's Action Party
- Spouse: Heng Teck Thai
- Education: Stanford University (BS, MS); Harvard University (MBA)

Mariam binte Jaafar (Note: Jawi: مريم بنت جعفر) (born 8 February 1977) is a Singaporean politician. A member of the governing People's Action Party (PAP), she has been the Member of Parliament (MP) for the Woodlands division of Sembawang Group Representation Constituency (GRC) since 2020.

== Early life and education ==
Mariam grew up in a 1-room HDB flat with her parents and siblings. Her father was a Malay language teacher while her mother was a nurse.

She attended Raffles Girls' Primary School for three years before transferring to Bukit View Primary School. When she was 13 years old, Mariam received the MENDAKI Scholarship from then-Deputy Prime Minister Goh Chok Tong.

Mariam attended Raffles Girls' School and Raffles Junior College before graduating from Stanford University in 2000 with a Bachelor of Science degree and a Master of Science degree in electrical and electronics engineering.

She subsequently went on to complete a Master of Business Administration degree at Harvard Business School in 2006.

== Career ==
Following her graduation from Harvard Business School, she worked at Boston Consulting Group. She is currently a Managing Director and Partner at the BCG office in Singapore and is a core member of the firm's Technology, Media & Telecommunications and Financial Institutions practices.

In 2016, Mariam was chosen to be a member of the Committee on the Future Economy, chaired by Finance Minister Heng Swee Keat. Mariam serves on the board of directors at the Government Technology Agency and at the Sentosa Development Corporation. She is also on the board of governors at her alma mater, Raffles Girls' School.

=== Political career ===
In the 2020 election, Mariam was nominated as a candidate of the ruling People's Action Party (PAP) for Sembawang GRC. On 10 July, she was elected to the Parliament, defeating the opposition candidates from the National Solidarity Party (NSP).

Mariam is appointed as Vice-Chairperson of Sembawang Town Council (SBTC) since 2020. Mariam is part of the Government Parliamentary Committee under Health where she serves as chairman since 2025.

== Personal life ==
Mariam is married to Heng Teck Thai.

== Notes ==
Parliament of Singapore
| Preceded by Amrin Amin; Lim Wee Kiak; Ong Ye Kung; Khaw Boon Wan; Vikram Nair | Member of Parliament for Sembawang GRC; 2020–present Served alongside: (2020-2025): Vikram Nair, Lim Wee Kiak, Ong Ye Kung, Poh Li San (2025-present): Vikram Nair, Gabriel Lam, Ng Shi Xuan, Ong Ye Kung | Incumbent |
