= Poh Li San =

Singaporean politician

The Honourable Poh Li San
- 傅丽珊
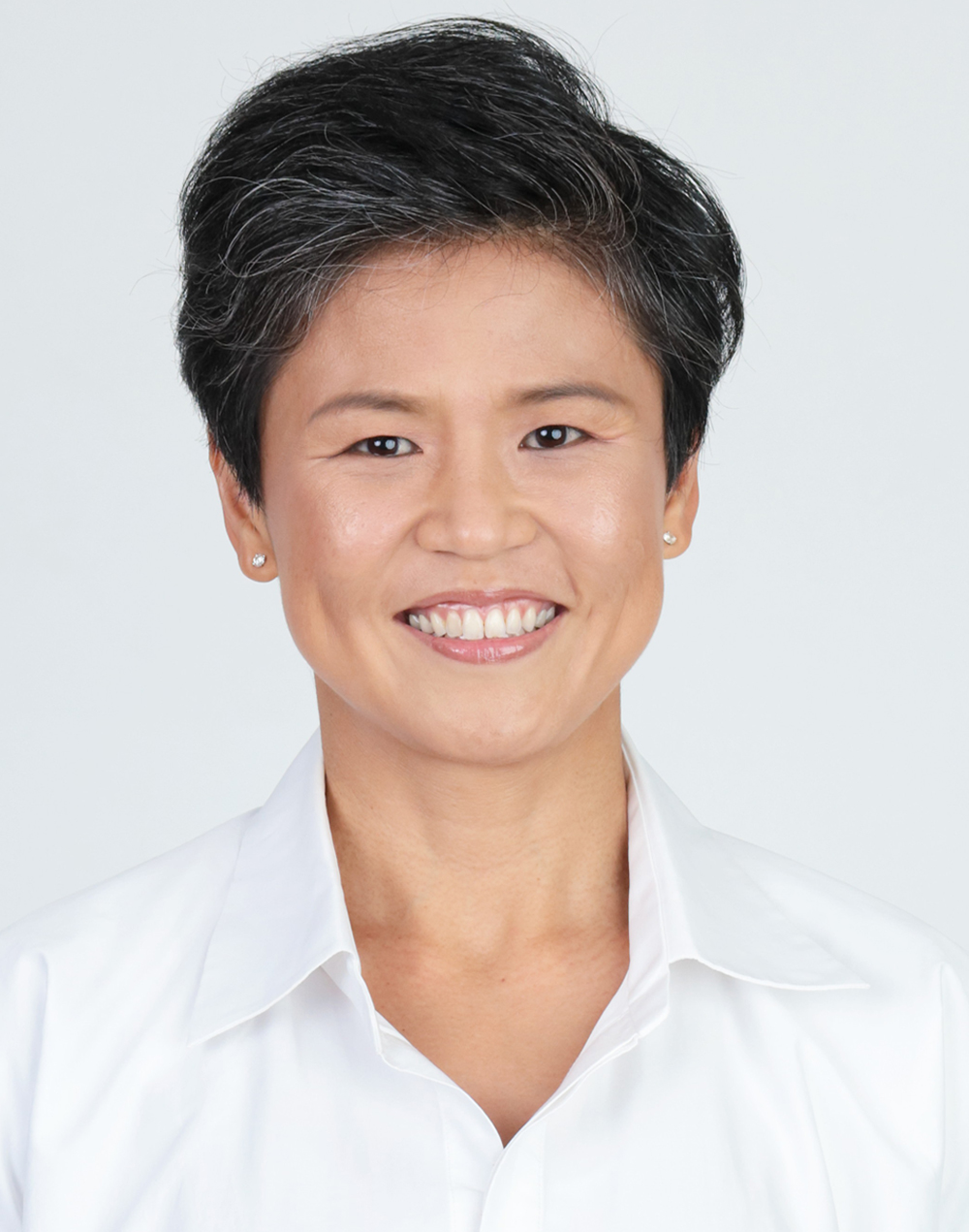
- Official portrait, 2021

Member of the Singapore Parliament for Sembawang West SMC
- Incumbent
- Assumed office 3 May 2025
- Preceded by: Constituency established
- Majority: 1,435 (6.36%)

Member of the Singapore Parliament for Sembawang GRC
- In office 10 July 2020 – 15 April 2025
- Preceded by: PAP held
- Succeeded by: PAP held
- Majority: 48,341 (34.58%)

Personal details
- Born: 19 November 1975 (age 50) Singapore
- Party: People's Action Party
- Education: University of Illinois Urbana–Champaign (BS, BA)
- Occupation: Politician

Military service
- Branch/service: Republic of Singapore Air Force
- Years of service: 1994–2010
- Rank: Major
- Unit: 125 Squadron

Poh Li San (Note: Chinese: 傅丽珊; pinyin: Fù Lìshān) (born 19 November 1975) is a Singaporean politician. A member of the governing People's Action Party (PAP), she has been the Member of Parliament (MP) for Sembawang West Single Member Constituency since 2025, and previously the Sembawang West division of Sembawang Group Representation Constituency between 2020 and 2025.

A recipient of the Singapore Armed Forces Merit Scholarship (Women), Poh was a helicopter pilot in the Republic of Singapore Air Force (RSAF) and the first female aide-de-camp to President S. R. Nathan. After leaving the RSAF in 2010, she joined the Changi Airport Group and rose to the position of Senior Vice President.

== Education ==
Poh attended Dunman High School and Temasek Junior College before graduating from the University of Illinois Urbana–Champaign in 1998 with a Bachelor of Science with highest honours degree in engineering and a Bachelor of Arts with summa cum laude and highest distinction degree in economics. She was awarded the Bronze Tablet for graduating top 3% in her cohort.

== Career ==
=== Military career ===
Poh was awarded the Singapore Armed Forces Merit Scholarship (Women) in 1994 and began her military career with the Republic of Singapore Air Force (RSAF) as a helicopter pilot after completing her education. She flew the Super Puma helicopter in 125 Squadron, Sembawang Airbase. Poh was a Search and Rescue pilot and was part of the SAF Humanitarian and Relief mission to Aceh following the Boxing Day Tsunami.

In 2003, Poh assumed the role of Assistant Director of the Future Systems Technology Directorate under the Ministry of Defence (MINDEF) and led the development of the technologies and formulated long term force development strategies and new war-fighting concepts for the SAF. In 2005, Poh was made Flight Commander of 125 Squadron, Sembawang Airbase.

In July 2006, Poh was appointed to be the first female aide-de-camp to then President S. R. Nathan. She was responsible for planning and organising state-level visits, meetings, ceremonies, and events.

In May 2010, Poh left the RSAF and attained the rank Major and joined Changi Airport Group.

=== Post-military career ===
Poh started her career in Changi Airport Group as Head, Budget Terminal in May 2010. She was in charge of the operations of the Changi Airport Budget Terminal. From 2012 to 2017, Poh led the planning and development of the new Terminal 4 where many new innovations and technologies were implemented to improve passenger experience and productivity. She is the Senior Vice-President of Terminal 5 Systems and is responsible for the planning of specialised airport engineering systems for the new terminal.

=== Political career ===
Poh joined the governing People's Action Party (PAP) as an activist in 2018. She served as a grassroots leader in Sembawang GRC, where she helped Member of Parliament (MP) and Minister for Education Ong Ye Kung in his Meet-the-People Sessions every Monday in his Gambas Ward. She was the chairman of the PAP Sembawang West Branch of Sembawang GRC and the Grassroots Advisor of Sembawang West Grassroots Organisations.

In the 2020 general election, she was fielded as a candidate for the PAP in Sembawang GRC alongside Ong Ye Kung, Vikram Nair, Lim Wee Kiak, and Mariam Jaafar. The PAP team won with 67.29% of votes against the National Solidarity Party. In the 14th Parliament of Singapore, she served as Deputy Chairperson of the Sustainability and Environment Government Parliament Committee (GPC), and was a member of the Transport GPC.

Poh was appointed as Vice-Chairperson of Sembawang Town Council (SBTC) in 2020.

Prior to the 2025 Singaporean election, Poh's ward of Sembawang West was carved out of Sembawang GRC. As a result, Poh left the GRC team to contest the Sembawang West Single Member Constituency. She won against the Singapore Democratic Party Secretary-General Chee Soon Juan with 53.18% of the vote.

== Notes ==
Parliament of Singapore
| Preceded by Lim Wee Kiak; Ong Ye Kung; Khaw Boon Wan; Amrin Amin | Member of Parliament for Sembawang GRC; 2020-2025; Served alongside: Vikram Nair, Lim Wee Kiak, Ong Ye Kung, Mariam Jaafar | Succeeded by Vikram Nair; Gabriel Lam; Ng Shi Xuan; Ong Ye Kung; Mariam Jaafar |
| New constituency | Member of Parliament for Sembawang West SMC; 2025-present | Incumbent |
