= Sembawang West Single Member Constituency =

Electoral division in Singapore

Sembawang West
- Single-member constituency for the Parliament of Singapore
- Region: North Region, Singapore
- Electorate: 24,206

Current constituency
- Created: 2025; 1 year ago
- Seats: 1
- Party: People's Action Party
- Member: Poh Li San
- Town Council: Sembawang
- Created from: Sembawang GRC

Sembawang West Single Member Constituency (Note: Malay: Kawasan Undi Sembawang West; Chinese: 三巴旺西单选区; Tamil: செம்பவாங் வெஸ்ட் தனித்தொகுதி) is a single-member constituency (SMC) situated in northern Singapore. It is managed by Sembawang Town Council. The current Member of Parliament (MP) for the constituency is Poh Li San from the People's Action Party (PAP).

== History ==
Prior to the 2025 general election, Sembawang West SMC was carved from the Sembawang West division of Sembawang Group Representation Constituency (GRC), in order to reduce the number of voters in the GRC. At establishment, there were 24,153 registered voters within the SMC.

After the redrawing of electoral boundaries, Chee Soon Juan, the leader of the Singapore Democratic Party (SDP), said that he would contest Sembawang West SMC as Bukit Batok SMC, where he had previously contested, had been absorbed into the newly established Jurong East–Bukit Batok GRC. The National Solidarity Party (NSP) initially intended to contest the SMC but announced on 20 April that it would back out to avoid a three-way fight. On 22 April, Poh, the incumbent MP for the Sembawang West division, announced her candidacy for the SMC.

During the campaigning, Ong Ye Kung claimed that Chee had "abandoned" Bukit Batok SMC by redeploying himself to Sembawang West SMC, Chee drew a comparison to Ong's shift to Sembawang GRC in 2015; he was part of the defeated PAP team for Aljunied GRC in 2011.

Poh eventually defeated Chee with over 53% of the vote. Chee would later miss out on becoming a non-constituency MP (NCMP) after Andre Low, Workers' Party (WP) candidate for Jalan Kayu SMC, and the WP team for Tampines GRC, outperformed him, respectively garnering 48.53% and 47.37% of the vote against victorious PAP candidates.

== Member of Parliament ==
Interactive map of Sembawang West SMC as of the 2025 general election

| Year | Member | Party |
|---|---|---|
Formation
| 2025 | Poh Li San | PAP |

== Electoral results ==
Note: The Elections Department does not include rejected votes when calculating the vote shares of candidates. Hence, all candidates' vote shares will total to 100% at any given election (may not appear so in multi-way contests due to rounding).

=== Elections in 2020s ===
General Election 2025: Sembawang West
| Party | Candidate | Votes | % |
|---|---|---|---|
| PAP | Poh Li San | 11,999 | 53.18 |
| SDP | Chee Soon Juan | 10,564 | 46.82 |
| Majority | | 1,435 | 6.36 |
| Total valid votes | | 22,563 | 98.82 |
| Rejected ballots | | 269 | 1.18 |
| Turnout | | 22,832 | 94.32 |
| Registered electors | | 24,206 | |
| PAP win (new seat) | | | |
