= Gabriel Lam (Singaporean politician) =

Singaporean businessman and politician

The Honourable Gabriel Lam
- 蓝延理

Member of Parliament for Sembawang GRC
- Incumbent
- Assumed office 4 May 2025
- Preceded by: PAP held
- Majority: 47,002 (37.84%)

Personal details
- Born: Gabriel Lam Yen Li; 1982 (age 43–44)
- Party: People's Action Party

Gabriel Lam Yen Li (Note: Chinese: 蓝延理; pinyin: Lán Yánlǐ) (born 1982) is a Singaporean businessman and politician. He was elected into the Parliament of Singapore on 4 May 2025. Lam represents the Canberra division in Sembawang Group Representation Constituency.

== Career ==
Gabriel Lam is the chief operating officer of moving company Shalom International Movers.

Lam first entered politics in the 2025 general election as part of the People's Action Party's Sembawang GRC team led by Health Minister Ong Ye Kung replacing Lim Wee Kiak. His team faced a three-cornered fight against the Singapore Democratic Party and National Solidarity Party. He was elected into the Parliament of Singapore on 3 May 2025 with 67.75% of the vote against the SDP's 29.93% and NSP's 2.32%.

== Personal life ==
Lam is married and has three children

== Notes ==
Parliament of Singapore
Preceded by Vikram Nair; Lim Wee Kiak; Ong Ye Kung; Mariam Jaafar; Poh Li San	Member of Parliament for Sembawang GRC; 2025–present Served alongside: (2025-present): Vikram Nair, Ng Shi Xuan, Mariam Jaafar, Ong Ye Kung	Incumbent
