= Ng Shi Xuan =

Singaporean politician

The Honourable Ng Shi Xuan
- 黄士轩

Member of Parliament for Sembawang GRC
- Incumbent
- Assumed office 4 May 2025
- Preceded by: PAP held
- Majority: 47,002 (37.84%)

Personal details
- Born: 1989 (age 36–37)
- Party: People's Action Party
- Children: 3

Ng Shi Xuan (Note: Chinese: 黄士轩; pinyin: Huáng Shìxuān) (born 1989) is a Singaporean politician who was elected to the Parliament of Singapore in the 2025 general election. A member of the People's Action Party, he serves as the Member of Parliament representing the Sembawang Group Representation Constituency since 2025.

== Education ==
Ng studied at Tanjong Katong Secondary School and Victoria Junior College, where he was a choir member, and read economics at the National University of Singapore. He later graduated with a bachelor's degree in economics.

== Career ==
Ng began volunteering at a community club in MacPherson Single Member Constituency in 2015. He was appointed treasurer of its Youth Executive Committee shortly after. In 2019, he took on the role of chairperson for the revamped Youth Network, where he led efforts to engage and support local youths. In 2023, he co-led the launch of an anti-vaping programme in response to a growing number of vaping cases among children and teenagers.

Ng was previously with Enterprise Singapore and was slated for a posting to Beijing. However, following his father’s passing, he chose to stay in Singapore to continue the family business Powermark Battery & Hardware Trading Pte Ltd.

=== Political career ===
Ng joined politics after being encouraged by Tin Pei Ling, member of parliament for MacPherson SMC, following his earlier community involvement. In the 2025 general election, as a member of the People's Action Party (PAP), he contested in Sembawang Group Representation Constituency alongside Vikram Nair, Mariam Jaafar, Gabriel Lam, and Ong Ye Kung. The PAP went against opposition parties Singapore Democratic Party (SDP) and National Solidarity Party (NSP). The PAP team were later elected with 67.75% of the vote, against the SDP's 29.93% and the NSP's 2.32%. Ng has served as the Vice-Chairman of the Sembawang Town Council (SBTC) since 2025.

== Personal life ==
Ng has three children and is a vegetarian Ng grew up in Yishun Ring Road.

== Notes ==
Parliament of Singapore
Preceded by Vikram Nair; Lim Wee Kiak; Ong Ye Kung; Mariam Jaafar; Poh Li San	Member of Parliament for Sembawang GRC; 2025–present Served alongside: Vikram Nair, Gabriel Lam, Mariam Jaafar, Ong Ye Kung	Incumbent
