= Raffles Junior College =

- 莱佛士初级学院 (Chinese); Maktab Rendah Raffles (Malay)
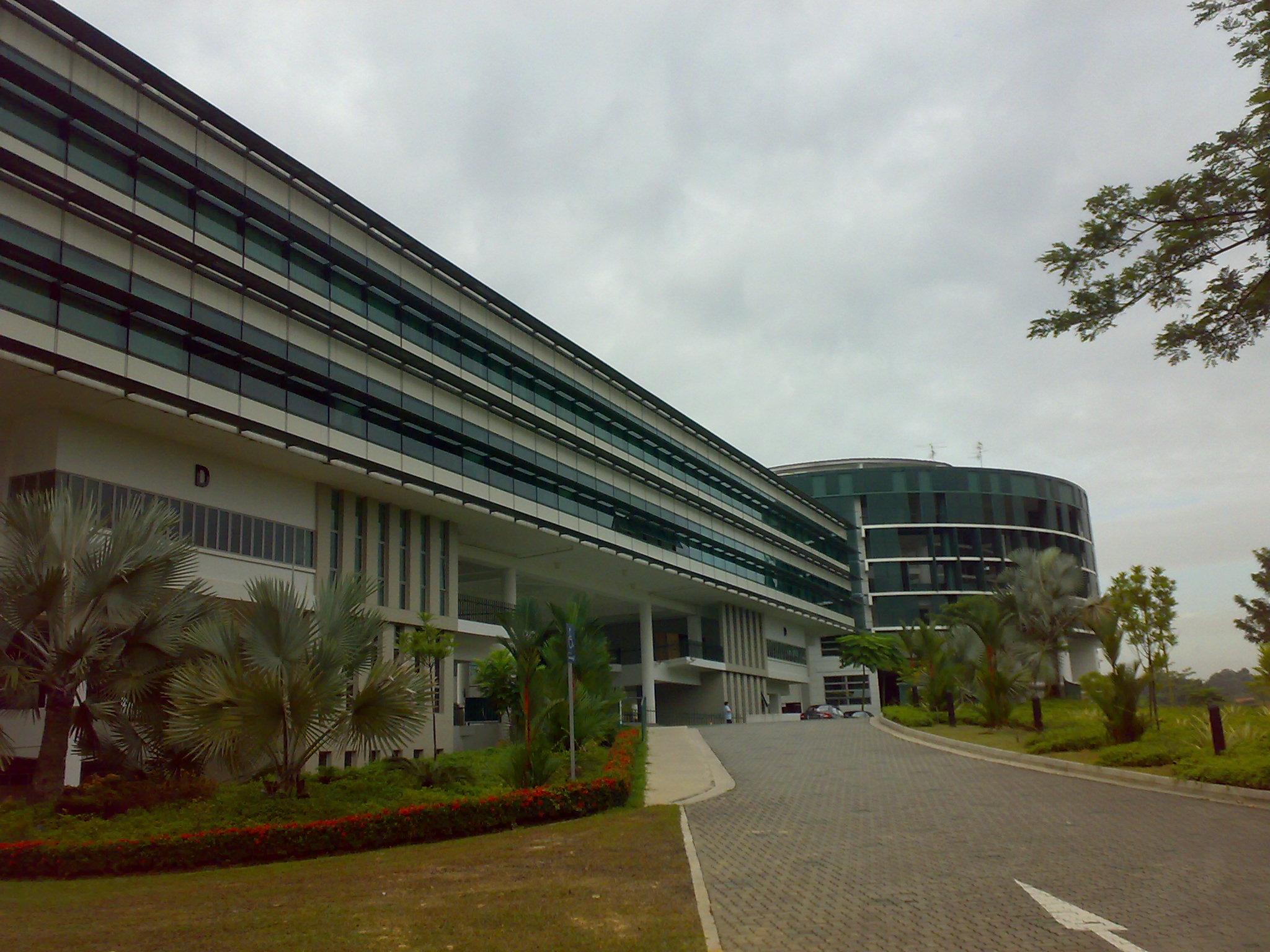

Location
- One Raffles Institution Lane; Singapore 575954; Singapore

Information
- Type: Independent
- Motto: Auspicium Melioris Aevi (Latin) (Note: While the school's translation of its motto is "hope of a better age", this is a mistranslation. Auspicium primarily means an augury or auspice, which is a divinatory omen derived by an augur from watching the flight of birds. It may mean omen, token or sign, but not hope.) (Hope of a Better Age)
- Founded: January 1982; 44 years ago
- Status: Part of Raffles Institution
- Closed: January 2009; 17 years ago
- Gender: Mixed
- Houses: Bayley-Waddle, Buckle-Buckley, Hadley-Hullett, Morrison-Richardson, Moor-Tarbet
- Colours: Green; White; Black
- Team name: Team Raffles, Gryphons

The Raffles Junior College (RJC) was a junior college in Singapore offering pre-university education. The college was founded in 1982, following a separation from the pre-university section of Raffles Institution (RI). Raffles Junior College was merged as the junior college section of Raffles Institution on 1 January 2009.

To date, the former junior college and the current Raffles Institution (Year 5-6) has produced 94 President's Scholars and the bulk of Public Service Commission scholars. RJC was recognised as one of the top feeder schools for the Ivy League universities.

== History ==
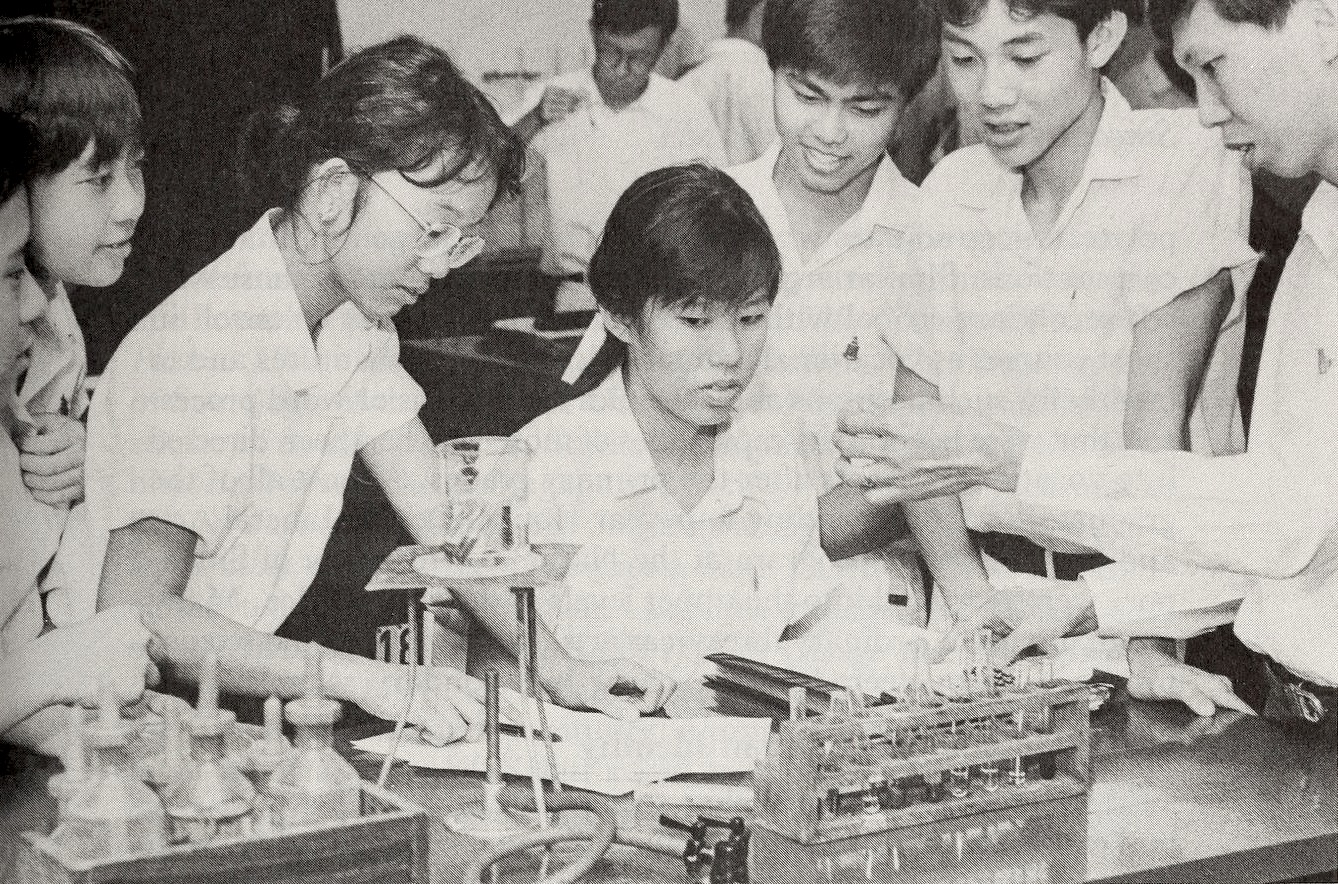
Raffles Junior college chemistry lab students in the early 1990s.

=== Founding years ===
In 1982, Raffles Institution's pre-university section was transferred from Grange Road to a temporary campus at Paterson Road. There, Raffles Junior College was established to offer the GCE A Level curriculum. It was the first junior college to be established with both JC1 and JC2 students, with the JC2 students having just completed their first pre-university year in the pre-university section of RI.

Raffles Junior College moved into a purpose built campus on 53 Mount Sinai Road in 1984 which provided better facilities and a larger site to cater to junior college education.

=== Introduction of the Raffles Programme ===
In 2004, the integrated programme of Raffles Institution, Raffles Girls' School, and Raffles Junior College, branded the Raffles Programme, was rolled out. On the same year, RJC was relocated to its new Bishan campus at 1 Raffles Institution Lane, adjacent to Raffles Institution. The two schools ran an open campus, allowing students to share facilities between the two institutions. This laid the foundation for the development of the Raffles Programme. A moving ceremony was held on 29 December 2004.

On 1 January 2005, the college became an independent institution. In the same year, RJC became the first junior college to be awarded the School Excellence Award, the highest award in the MOE Masterplan of Awards. The new campus was officially declared open by Prime Minister Lee Hsien Loong on 8 April 2006, in conjunction with the college's 25th anniversary celebrations.

=== Reintegration with Raffles Institution ===
On 1 January 2009, Raffles Junior College re-merged into Raffles Institution to facilitate running of the Integrated Programme. The college section (Year 5–6) kept the name as Raffles Institution (Junior College) until 2010, after which it was officially renamed as Raffles Institution. This administrative merger allowed the new institution to function as a single educational organisation on the foundation of a shared campus.

== Principals ==
- Rudy Mosbergen (1982–1987)
- Lee Fong Seng (1988–2000)
- Winston James Hodge (2001–2007)
- Lim Lai Cheng (2008–2009)

== Culture and identity ==
=== College anthem ===
Raffles Junior College shared the same anthem, Auspicium Melioris Aevi, with Raffles Institution. The anthem was written by E W Jesudason in 1961, who served as headmaster of Raffles Institution from 1963 to 1966.

=== Coat of arms ===
Raffles Junior College shared its crest with Raffles Institution, a modified version of the Raffles' coat of arms, permission for use of which was granted by his family. This replaces the original erminois portion of the field with gold and the purpure of the gryphon crest with gules.

The gryphon on the crest is a stately creature, majestic and strong, symbolising stability and success for the school. The double-headed eagle on the shield signifies the looking back onto the past and onto the future, symbolising the institution's tradition of drawing strength and experience from the past to excel in the future.

The motto "Auspicium Melioris Aevi", displayed at the base of the shield, is officially translated as "Hope of a Better Age". While a mistranslation, this has become the standard version. It is also the motto of the Order of St Michael and St George.

=== House system ===
RJC had a faculty system in place before May 2005. Under the faculty system, students belonged to one of the five faculties, namely: Arts (red), Commerce (black), Computing and Pure Science (green), Engineering (blue) and Medicine (yellow). To facilitate the Raffles Programme from 2005, students of Raffles Junior College were divided into five Houses, the name of which is an amalgamation of its counterparts in RI and RGS: Bayley-Waddle (yellow); Buckle-Buckley (green); Hadley-Hullett (purple/black); Morrison-Richardson (blue); Moor-Tarbet (red).

Students from the Raffles Programme remained in the same House for the entire six years, while students enrolled into RJC via the Joint Admissions Exercise (JAE) were assigned to a House upon admission. Houses compete in Inter-House Competitions (IHC) annually. Organised by the Students' Council, the events span across disciplines and challenge participants both physically and mentally. The IHC Remix is generally held earlier in the year and comprises the non-Sports events whilst IHC Sports is held later in the year.

This arrangement is retained with the merger of RJC into RI in January 2009.

== Affiliation ==
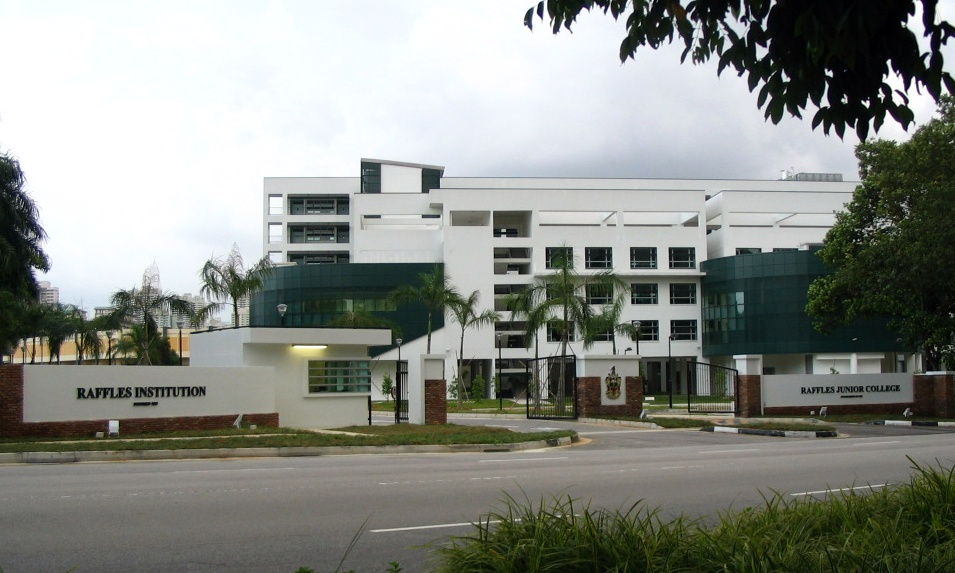
Main entrance to Raffles Institution's Bishan campus, which before the 2009 reintegration was a common driveway between RI and RJC.

Between 2005 and 2009, Raffles Junior College co-ran the Raffles Programme (Integrated Programme) with Raffles Institution and Raffles Girls' School (RGS). In the programme, boys receive their first four years of secondary education in RI and girls in RGS, before completing their pre-university studies in the co-educational Raffles Junior College.

== Campus ==
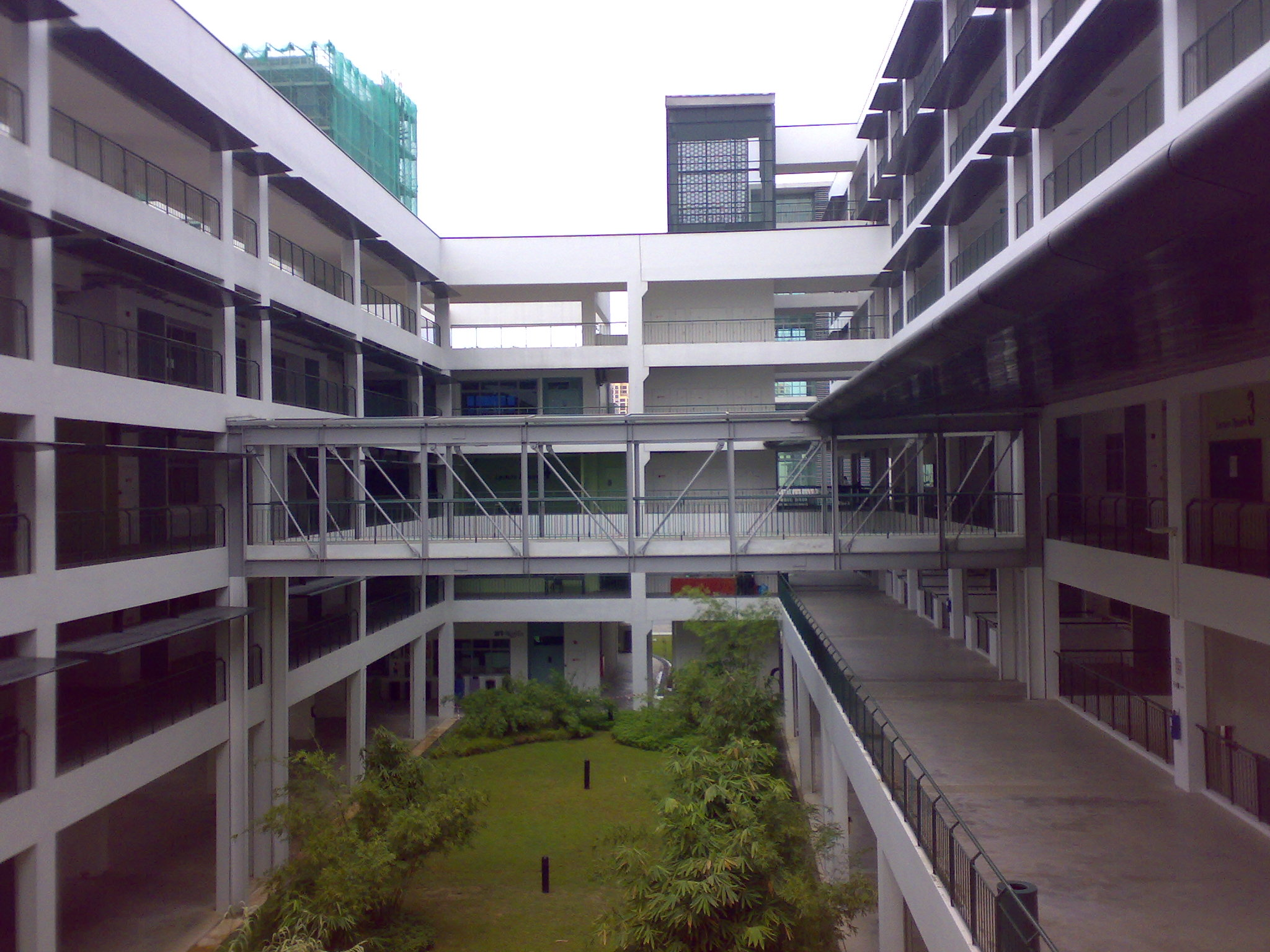
The bridge connecting Blocks A and B and the courtyard between the two blocks

The most recent campus of the former RJC, currently RI's Year 5–6 campus consists of 11 blocks and three fields. Facilities include six lecture theatres, a Performing Arts Centre, the Singapore Pools Indoor Sports Hall and the Shaw Foundation Library.

== Curriculum ==
=== Raffles Academy ===
Started in 2007 in Raffles Institution, prior to the 2009 RI-RJC merger, the Raffles Academy was a talent development programme designed to meet the learning needs of students exceptionally gifted in a particular subject. The programme originally spanned Years 3 and 4 but in 2009 was expanded to Years 5 and 6.

The Year 5–6 Raffles Academy offers four subjects, Biology, Chemistry, Mathematics and Physics, of which students can offer up to two, although Mathematics may be offered only with Physics and Biology with Chemistry. Students in the Raffles Academy attend pull-out lectures and tutorials as well as a weekly enrichment session, although they follow the H2 curriculum.

At the end of Year 4, students may apply for the Year 5–6 Raffles Academy by submitting a personal statement and portfolio, and sitting for a selection test. Approximately 100 students per batch are selected for the Raffles Academy.

=== Raffles Humanities Programme ===
The Humanities Scholarship Programme is the Arts equivalent of the Raffles Academy for sciences, accepting exceptionally gifted humanities students who take the Arts subjects (including but not limited to Literature, Economics, History, Geography, English Language and Linguistics). Students can enter this elite programme either through internal interviews or via the Ministry of Education (MOE) Scholarship route. Students accepted into the programme are placed in separate classes from the mainstream Arts classes and occupy a distinct Humanities building within the school, complete with their own lecture hall and classrooms. Lessons conducted under the programme aim to be more interactive, involving students in discussions to a greater extent so as to promote critical thinking skills. Over the course of the programme, Humanities Programme (HP) students benefit from various enrichment activities including weekly guest speakers and humanities workshops. Apart from that, students also have to opportunity to embark on overseas trips to Asia countries such as Japan and South Korea.

== Achievements ==
Raffles Junior College / Raffles Institution (Junior College) has produced 94 President's Scholars since Singapore's independence in 1965, a notable record among Singapore schools.

== Notable alumni ==
=== Politicians ===
- Chan Chun Sing, Minister for Defence and Member of Parliament for Tanjong Pagar Group Representation Constituency
- Darryl David, former television personality and Member of Parliament for Ang Mo Kio Group Representation Constituency
- Desmond Lee Ti-Seng, Minister for Education, and Member of Parliament for West Coast Group Representation Constituency
- Desmond Tan, Minister of State in the Prime Minister's Office, and Member of Parliament for Pasir Ris–Changi Group Representation Constituency
- Vikram Nair, Member of Parliament for Sembawang Group Representation Constituency
- Ong Ye Kung, Minister for Health, Coordinating Minister for Social Policies, and Member of Parliament for Sembawang Group Representation Constituency
- Rahayu Mahzam, Member of Parliament for Jurong East–Bukit Batok Group Representation Constituency
- Christopher de Souza, Deputy Speaker of the Parliament of Singapore, and Member of Parliament for Holland–Bukit Timah Group Representation Constituency
- Tan Chuan-Jin, former Speaker of Parliament
- Josephine Teo, Minister for Digital Development and Information and Member of Parliament for Jalan Besar Group Representation Constituency
- Edwin Tong, Minister for Law and Member of Parliament for East Coast Group Representation Constituency
- Zaqy Mohamad, Senior Minister of State for Manpower and Defence, Deputy Leader of the House, Member of Parliament for Marsiling–Yew Tee Group Representation Constituency
- Dennis Tan, Member of Parliament for Hougang Single Member Constituency
- He Ting Ru, Member of Parliament for Sengkang Group Representation Constituency
- Jamus Lim, Member of Parliament for Sengkang Group Representation Constituency
- Kenneth Tiong, Member of Parliament for Aljunied Group Representation Constituency
- Leong Mun Wai, former Non-constituency Member of Parliament of 14th Parliament of Singapore
- Carrie Tan, former Member of Parliament
- Mariam Jaafar, Member of Parliament for Sembawang Group Representation Constituency

=== Entertainment and media personalities ===
- Kit Chan, singer
- Kaira Gong, singer
- Corrinne May, singer-songwriter
- Rui En, actress and singer

=== Writers ===
- Alfian Sa'at, writer, poet and playwright
- Alvin Pang, poet, editor and writer

=== Academics ===
- Boon Thau Loo, Professor of Computer Science and Associate Dean at University of Pennsylvania

=== Religious leaders ===
- Kong Hee, former City Harvest Church pastor

== Gallery ==
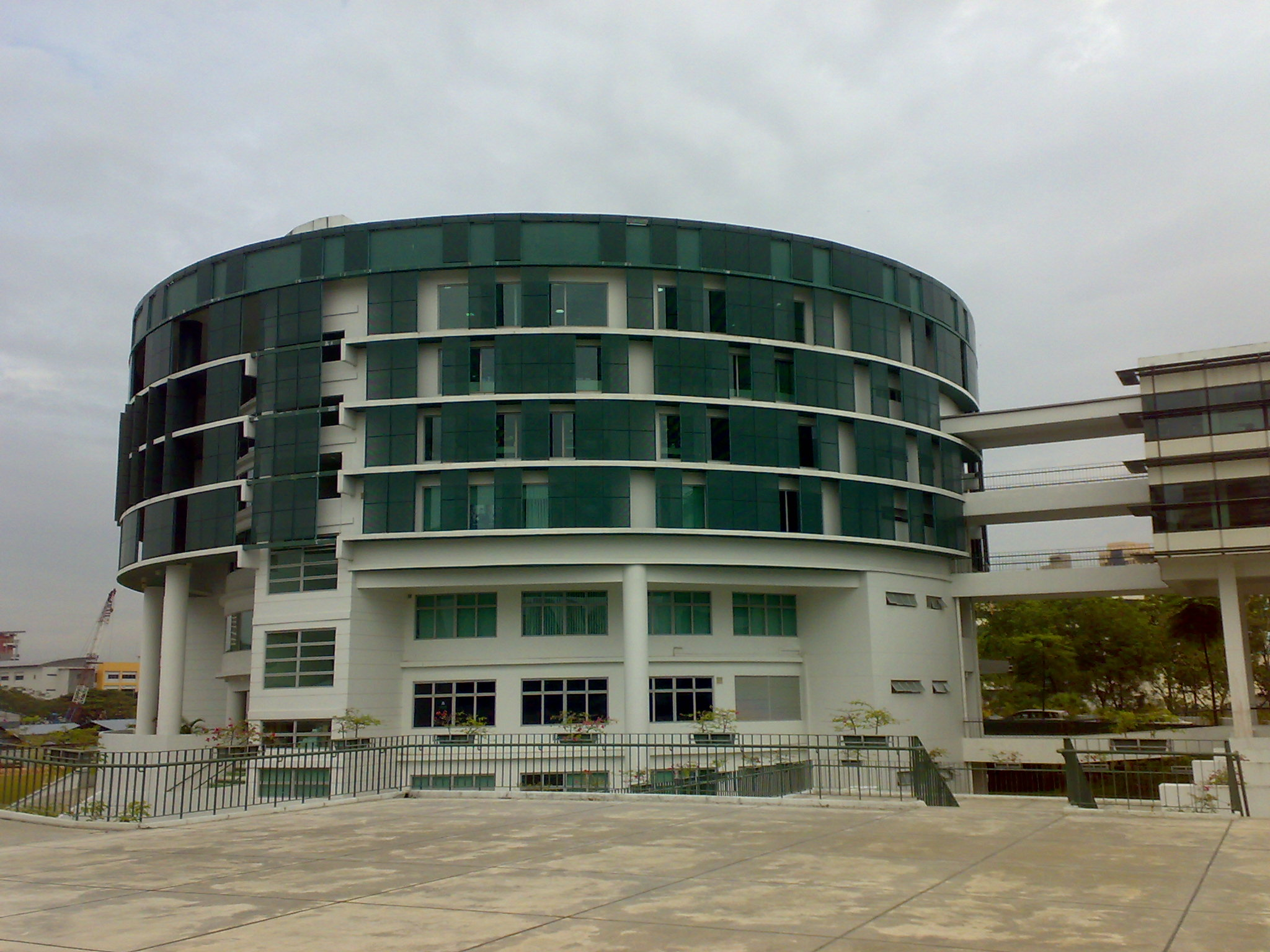
Former Library Block of RJC, current Block H of RI.
