= Bukit Panjang Single Member Constituency (1955 – 1991) =

Former electoral division in Singapore

Coordinates: 1.38°N 103.78°E

Bukit Panjang
- Former single-member constituency for the Parliament of Singapore
- Region: West Region, Singapore
- Electorate: 33,824

Former constituency
- Created: 1955; 71 years ago
- Abolished: 1991; 35 years ago
- Seats: 1
- Party: People's Action Party
- Member: Lee Yiok Seng
- Merged to: Sembawang GRC (1991)

The Bukit Panjang Single Member Constituency (Note: Malay: Kawasan Undi Perseorangan Bukit Panjang; Chinese: 武吉班让单选区; Tamil: புக்கிட் பாஞ்சாங் தனித்தொகுதி) was a single-member constituency (SMC) situated in north-western Singapore. It was established in 1955 and was merged into Sembawang Group Representation Constituency (GRC) in 1991. The last Member of Parliament (MP) for the constituency was Lee Yiok Seng from the People's Action Party (PAP).

A constituency of the same name was recreated in 2006.

== Electoral history ==
Bukit Panjang Constituency was established for the 1955 general election. Goh Tong Liang from the Progressive Party (PP) defeated Lim Wee Toh from the Labour Front (LF).

In the subsequent 1959 general election, Lee Khoon Choy from the PAP won 58.31% of the vote in a four-way contest involving the Liberal Socialist Party (LSP), the Singapore People's Alliance (SPA) and the Malayan Indian Congress (MIC). The PAP, however, lost the seat in the 1963 general election to Barisan Sosialis (BS), founded by the former left-wing faction of the PAP. Ong Lian Teng, father of future PAP minister Ong Ye Kung, was elected. The PAP regained the seat in a walkover at one of five 1967 by-elections after all BS MPs resigned as part of a boycott, protesting the legitimacy of the government following Singapore's independence.

Following the by-election, the PAP continued to hold the constituency, with P. Selvadurai serving as its MP until the 1972 general election. He was then fielded in Kuo Chuan Constituency and succeeded by Lee Yiok Seng in Bukit Panjang. In that election, Lee won with 67.65% of the vote, defeating Workers' Party (WP) candidate Tang Song Khiang and United National Front (UNF) candidate Leyu Tan Jib, who secured 24.82% and 7.53% respectively.

Prior to the 1988 general election, following the establishment of GRC and SMC, the constituency was formally designated as Bukit Panjang SMC. Lee won the contest in a three way fight between PAP, Singapore Democratic Party and Singapore Malay National Organisation (PKMS) and continued to serve as MP until the constituency was abolished and merged into Sembawang GRC in the 1991 general election.

== Member of Parliament ==
| Year | Member | Party |
|---|---|---|
Formation
Legislative Assembly of Singapore
| 1955 | Goh Tong Liang | PP |
| 1959 | Lee Khoon Choy | PAP |
| 1963 | Ong Lian Teng | BS |
Parliament of Singapore
| 1967 | P. Selvadurai | PAP |
| 1968 | P. Selvadurai | PAP |
| 1972 | Lee Yiok Seng | PAP |
| 1976 | Lee Yiok Seng | PAP |
| 1980 | Lee Yiok Seng | PAP |
| 1984 | Lee Yiok Seng | PAP |
| 1988 | Lee Yiok Seng | PAP |
Constituency abolished (1991)

== Electoral results ==
Note: The Elections Department does not include rejected votes when calculating the vote shares of candidates. Hence, all candidates' vote shares will total to 100% at any given election (may not appear so in multi-way contests due to rounding).

=== Elections in 1950s ===
General Election 1955
| Party | Candidate | Votes | % |
|---|---|---|---|
| PP | Goh Tong Liang | 3,097 | 72.21 |
| LF | Lim Wee Toh | 2,494 | 27.79 |
| Majority | | 1,905 | 44.42 |
| Total valid votes | | 4,289 | 98.48 |
| Rejected ballots | | 66 | 1.52 |
| Turnout | | 4,355 | 54.4 |
| Registered electors | | 8,012 | |
| PP win (new seat) | | | |

General Election 1959
| Party | Candidate | Votes | % | ±% |
|---|---|---|---|---|
| PAP | Lee Khoon Choy | 6,156 | 58.14 | N/A |
| LSP | Tan Leong Teck | 2,494 | 23.55 | N/A |
| SPA | Lim Siak Guan | 1,382 | 13.05 | N/A |
| MIC | T. T. K. Alexander | 526 | 4.96 | N/A |
| Majority | | 3,662 | 34.59 | ▼9.83 |
| Total valid votes | | 10,588 | 99.45 | ▲0.97 |
| Rejected ballots | | 89 | 0.55 | ▼0.97 |
| Turnout | | 10,647 | 88.84 | ▲34.44 |
| Registered electors | | 11,984 | | ▲49.58 |
| PAP gain from LSP | | | | |

Note: The MIC was allied with the Singaporean branches of UMNO and MCA, similar to its Malaysian counterpart, but did not use the alliance symbol. As a result, the Elections Department Singapore classified T. T. K. Alexander as an independent candidate.

=== Elections in 1960s ===
General Election 1963
| Party | Candidate | Votes | % | ±% |
|---|---|---|---|---|
| BS | Ong Lian Teng | 5,679 | 46.45 | N/A |
| PAP | Lee Khoon Choy | 4,940 | 40.41 | ▼17.9 |
| SA | Loo Bah Chit | 999 | 8.17 | ▼9.84 |
| UPP | Thuan Paik Phok | 607 | 4.97 | N/A |
| Majority | | 739 | 6.04 | ▼28.55 |
| Total valid votes | | 12,225 | 98.93 | ▼0.52 |
| Rejected ballots | | 132 | 1.07 | ▲0.52 |
| Turnout | | 12,357 | 95.07 | ▲6.23 |
| Registered electors | | 12,997 | | ▲8.45 |
| BS gain from PAP | | Swing | ▲46.5 | |

By-election 1967
| Party | Candidate | Votes | % | ±% |
|---|---|---|---|---|
| PAP | P. Selvadurai | Unopposed | | |
| Registered electors | | 16,070 | | ▲23.64 |
| PAP gain from BS | | | | |

General Election 1968
| Party | Candidate | Votes | % | ±% |
|---|---|---|---|---|
| PAP | P. Selvadurai | Unopposed | | |
| Registered electors | | 17,893 | | ▲11.34 |
| PAP hold | | | | |

=== Elections in 1970s ===
General Election 1972
| Party | Candidate | Votes | % | ±% |
|---|---|---|---|---|
| PAP | Lee Yiok Seng | 9,527 | 67.65 | N/A |
| WP | Tang Song Khiang | 3,496 | 24.82 | N/A |
| United National Front | Leyu Tan Jib | 1,060 | 7.53 | N/A |
| Majority | | 6,031 | 42.83 | N/A |
| Total valid votes | | 14,083 | 97.73 | N/A |
| Rejected ballots | | 327 | 2.27 | N/A |
| Turnout | | 14,410 | 93.20 | N/A |
| Registered electors | | 15,461 | | ▼13.59 |
| PAP hold | | | | |

General Election 1976
| Party | Candidate | Votes | % | ±% |
|---|---|---|---|---|
| PAP | Lee Yiok Seng | 11,867 | 67.43 | ▼0.22 |
| WP | Ho Juan Thai | 5,731 | 32.57 | ▲7.75 |
| Majority | | 6,136 | 34.86 | ▼7.97 |
| Total valid votes | | 17,598 | 97.57 | ▼0.16 |
| Rejected ballots | | 438 | 2.43 | ▲0.16 |
| Registered electors | | 18,906 | | ▲22.28 |
| Turnout | | 18,036 | 95.40 | ▲2.20 |
| PAP hold | | Swing | ▼0.22 | |

=== Elections in 1980s ===
General Election 1980
| Party | Candidate | Votes | % | ±% |
|---|---|---|---|---|
| PAP | Lee Yiok Seng | 18,510 | 87.03 | ▲19.60 |
| United People's Front | Mohamad Sani bin Jan | 2,759 | 12.97 | ▲13.0 |
| Majority | | 15,751 | 74.0 | ▲39.2 |
| Total valid votes | | 21,269 | 96.59 | ▼0.98 |
| Rejected ballots | | 750 | 3.41 | ▲0.98 |
| Turnout | | 22,019 | 94.48 | ▼0.92 |
| Registered electors | | 23,305 | | ▲23.27 |
| PAP hold | | Swing | ▲19.60 | |

General Election 1984
| Party | Candidate | Votes | % | ±% |
|---|---|---|---|---|
| PAP | Lee Yiok Seng | Unopposed | | |
| Registered electors | | 23,173 | | ▼0.56 |
| PAP hold | | | | |

General Election 1988
| Party | Candidate | Votes | % | ±% |
|---|---|---|---|---|
| PAP | Lee Yiok Seng | 18,314 | 57.28 | N/A |
| SDP | Kwek Guan Kwee | 9,864 | 30.86 | N/A |
| PKMS | Ibrahim bin Ariff | 3,790 | 11.86 | N/A |
| Majority | | 8,450 | 26.42 | N/A |
| Total valid votes | | 31,968 | 98.16 | N/A |
| Rejected ballots | | 599 | 1.84 | N/A |
| Turnout | | 32,567 | 96.28 | N/A |
| Registered electors | | 33,824 | | ▲45.96 |
| PAP hold | | | | |

== Historical maps ==
Bukit Panjang constituency for the 1955 general election to the Legislative Assembly
