= James Gomez =

James Gomez may refer to:

- James Gomez (politician), Singaporean politician
- James Gomez (footballer), Gambian footballer
