= Lee Yiok Seng =

Singaporean politician (1939–2026)

- 李玉胜
- Born: 11 October 1939
- Died: 30 October 2026 (aged 87)
- Occupation: Politician
- Years active: 1972–1996
- Political party: PAP
- Children: 2

Lee Yiok Seng (Chinese: 李玉胜; pinyin: Lǐ yùshèng; 11 October 1939 – 30 October 2026) was a Singaporean politician. A member of the People's Action Party (PAP), he was the Member of Parliament (MP) for the Bukit Panjang Single Member Constituency (SMC) from 1972 to 1991 and a MP for the Sembawang Group Representation Constituency (GRC) from 1991 to 1996.

== Education ==
Lee had his primary education at Segamat, Malaysia and then his secondary education in Singapore. He graduated from Nanyang University with a bachelor's degree in Science in 1964.

== Political career ==
Lee had joined the PAP in 1964 and was the organising secretary of the Youth Movement in the People's Association.

Lee first contested Bukit Panjang Constituency during the 1972 Singaporean general election. He had won the subsequent elections for the constituency from 1976 to 1988. Bukit Panjang SMC was merged into Sembawang GRC in 1991 and Lee become part of a PAP team contesting the GRC and the team was uncontested during the 1997 Singaporean general election.

Lee was appointed Parliamentary Secretary for National Development in 1979 before promoting to Senior Parliamentary Secretary for National Development until 1993. He was then appointed Senior Parliamentary Secretary for Labour till his retirement in December 1996.

Lee also resettled Singaporeans into both Bukit Panjang and Marsiling areas from the kampongs in 1980s, with the rapid development of both Bukit Panjang and Marsiling areas. In addition, Lee also championed the development and opening of Bukit Panjang LRT line, and expanded the growth of Bukit Panjang to include the northern parts of Bukit Panjang as well, the construction of Gali Batu Depot for the Downtown Line in 2008 to 2014 and as well as conversion of the Gali Batu area to the military training area.

== Personal life ==
Lee had two children.

Lee died on 30 October 2026, at the age of 87. His wake was held at Woodlands Memorial Hall from 12 to 14 November and his cremation was on 14 November.
