= Ong Ye Kung =

Singaporean politician (born 1969)

The Honourable Ong Ye Kung PPA(P)
- 王乙康
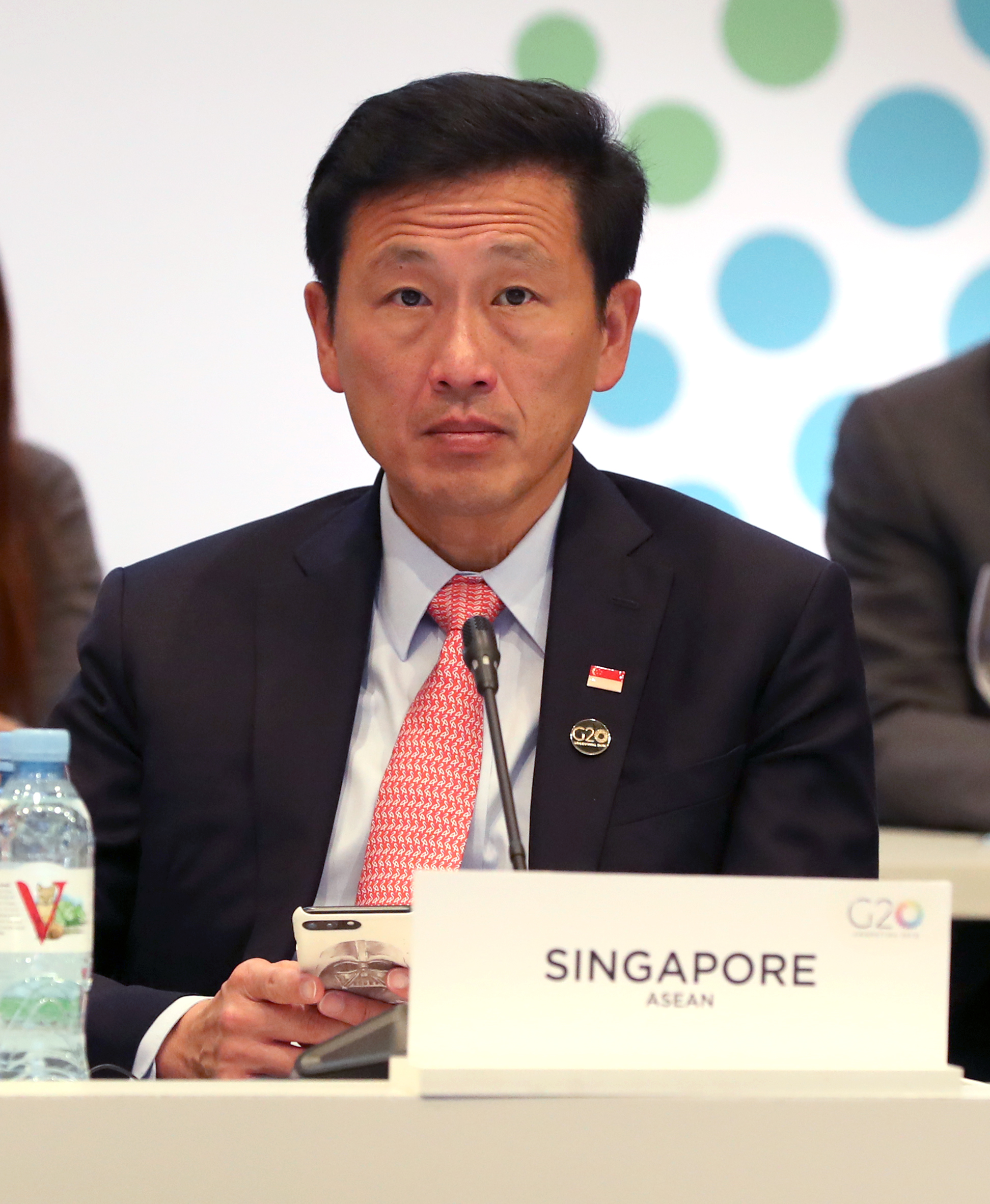
- Ong in 2018

Coordinating Minister for Social Policies
- Incumbent
- Assumed office 23 May 2025
- Prime Minister: Lawrence Wong
- Preceded by: Tharman Shanmugaratnam (2023)

Treasurer of the People's Action Party
- Incumbent
- Assumed office 29 May 2025
- Prime Minister: Lawrence Wong
- Preceded by: K Shanmugam

Minister for Health
- Incumbent
- Assumed office 15 May 2021
- Prime Minister: Lee Hsien Loong; Lawrence Wong
- Second Minister: Masagos Zulkifli (until 2025)
- Preceded by: Gan Kim Yong

Minister for Transport
- In office 27 July 2020 – 14 May 2021
- Prime Minister: Lee Hsien Loong
- Preceded by: Khaw Boon Wan
- Succeeded by: S. Iswaran

Minister for Education
- In office 1 May 2018 – 26 July 2020
- Prime Minister: Lee Hsien Loong
- Second Minister: Indranee Rajah
- Preceded by: Ng Chee Meng (Minister of Education) (Schools)
- Succeeded by: Lawrence Wong

Minister for Education (Higher Education and Skills)
- In office 1 October 2015 – 30 April 2018; Acting: 1 October 2015 – 31 October 2016 Serving with Ng Chee Meng (2015–2018)
- Prime Minister: Lee Hsien Loong
- Preceded by: Heng Swee Keat (as Minister for Education)
- Succeeded by: Office abolished

Second Minister for Defence
- In office 1 November 2016 – 30 April 2018
- Prime Minister: Lee Hsien Loong
- Minister: Ng Eng Hen
- Preceded by: Lui Tuck Yew
- Succeeded by: Office vacated

Member of the Singapore Parliament for Sembawang GRC
- Incumbent
- Assumed office 11 September 2015
- Preceded by: PAP held
- Majority: 2015: 59,572 (44.56%); 2020: 48,398 (34.58%); 2025: 47,002 (37.84%)

Personal details
- Born: 15 November 1969 (age 57) Singapore
- Party: People's Action Party
- Spouse: Diana Kuik Sin Leng
- Relations: Xie Yao Quan (maternal cousin)
- Children: 2
- Parent(s): Ong Lian Teng (father); Ng Soo Lung (mother)
- Education: London School of Economics (BSc); International Institute for Management Development (MBA)
- Occupation: Politician; civil servant

Ong Ye Kung (Note: IPA: /ˈɒŋ ˌiː ˈkʌŋ/ ONG EE-KUNG; Chinese: 王乙康; pinyin: Wáng Yǐkāng; Pe̍h-ōe-jī: Ông It-khong) (born 15 November 1969) is a Singaporean politician and former civil servant who has served as the Treasurer of the People's Action Party since 2025 and has been serving as Minister for Health since 2021. A member of the governing People's Action Party (PAP), he has been the Member of Parliament (MP) representing the Sembawang Central division of Sembawang Group Representation Constituency since 2015.

Prior to entering politics, Ong worked in the Ministry of Communications, Ministry of Trade and Industry, Singapore Workforce Development Agency, National Trades Union Congress and Keppel Corporation. He was also the principal private secretary to Deputy Prime Minister Lee Hsien Loong between 2002 and 2004.

He made his political debut in the 2011 general election as part of a five-member PAP team contesting in Aljunied GRC but lost to the Workers' Party where the PAP team obtained 45.28% of the valid votes. He contested again in the 2015 general election as part of a five-member PAP team contesting in Sembawang GRC and won where the PAP team obtained 72.28% of the valid votes.

Before becoming Minister for Health, he was Minister for Education between 2015 and 2020, serving alongside Ng Chee Meng between 2015 and 2018, and Minister for Transport between 2020 and 2021. From 2020 to 2021, he is also a co-chair of the Multi-Ministry Taskforce set up by the government to manage Singapore's handling response to the COVID-19 pandemic.

== Education ==
Ong attended Maris Stella High School and Raffles Junior College, before graduating from the London School of Economics in 1991 with a Bachelor of Science degree in economics, on a Public Service Commission scholarship.

In 1999, he completed a Master of Business Administration degree at the International Institute for Management Development in Lausanne, Switzerland.

== Career ==
=== Civil Service career ===
Ong started his career working in the Ministry of Communications between 1993 and 1999. He served as Director of Trade in the Ministry of Trade and Industry between 2000 and 2003 and was the Deputy Chief Negotiator for the Singapore–United States Free Trade Agreement signed in May 2003. He was Principal Private Secretary to Deputy Prime Minister Lee Hsien Loong between 2002 and 2004. Ong also served as the chief executive officer of the Workforce Development Agency between 2005 and 2008. Following that, he joined the National Trades Union Congress as Assistant Secretary-General.

=== Political career ===
In the 2011 general election, Ong contested in Aljunied GRC as part of a five-member People's Action Party (PAP) team. The PAP team lost to the Workers' Party's (WP) team of Low Thia Khiang, Pritam Singh, Sylvia Lim, Muhamad Faisal Manap and Chen Show Mao. This was the first time in Singapore's history when the PAP lost a GRC in an election. Ong was subsequently regulated into branch chair duties as unelected Kaki Bukit Branch Chair. Ong would later leave his branch chair post in 2014.

Following the 2011 general election, Ong continued to work at the National Trades Union Congress (NTUC) and became Deputy Secretary-General in June 2011. He was also elected into the NTUC's Central Committee later that year. In 2013, he left the NTUC and became Director of Group Strategy at Keppel Corporation.

In the 2015 general election, Ong joined as part of the five-member PAP team contesting in Sembawang GRC, The PAP team won with 72% of the vote and Ong was elected as the Member of Parliament representing the Gambas ward of Sembawang GRC.

On 1 October 2015, Ong was appointed Senior Minister of State for Defence and Acting Minister for Education (Higher Education and Skills). On 1 November 2016, he was promoted to Second Minister for Defence while concurrently holding the portfolio of Minister for Education (Higher Education and Skills) alongside Ng Chee Meng, who was Minister for Education (Schools). In 2017, Ong moved a bill in Parliament to confer the Singapore University of Social Sciences autonomous status.

On 1 May 2018, the two Education portfolios were merged into a single one; Ong took over the single portfolio as Minister for Education while simultaneously relinquishing his Second Minister of Defence portfolio.

On 27 July 2020, Ong relinquished his portfolio as Minister for Education and succeeded Khaw Boon Wan as Minister for Transport.

In the lead-up to the 2020 general election, Ong was widely seen as one of the three leading candidates (alongside Heng Swee Keat and Chan Chun Sing) to succeed Lee Hsien Loong as Prime Minister of Singapore. Ong led the PAP team in Sembawang GRC and they won with about 67% of the vote. Ong's former Gambas ward was merged with part of Khaw Boon Wan's former Sembawang ward, forming the new Sembawang Central ward which Ong has since represented.

On 23 April 2021, Ong was appointed co-chair of the multi-ministerial committee formed on 22 January 2020 to manage the COVID-19 pandemic in Singapore. Following a Cabinet reshuffle on 15 May 2021, Ong relinquished his portfolio as Minister for Transport and succeeded Gan Kim Yong as Minister for Health.

Ong was considered by many to be one of the most likely candidates to succeed Heng Swee Keat as leader of the fourth-generation (4G) team, however it was ultimately revealed that Finance Minister Lawrence Wong had the most support compared to the other candidates.

On 23 April 2025, Ong stood for re-election in Sembawang GRC, and was successfully nominated. He led the PAP team, which also consisted of incumbent MPs Mariam Jaafar and Vikram Nair, and new faces Gabriel Lam and Ng Shi Xuan. His team won in a three-cornered fight with the National Solidarity Party (NSP) and Singapore Democratic Party (SDP).

On 6 May, 3 days after the general election, it was revealed that Ong, alongside fellow ministers Chee Hong Tat and Ng Chee Meng, had dined with convicted money launderer Su Haijin in a photo.

Ong retained his Minister for Health portfolio and was also appointed Coordinating Minister for Social Policies in the Cabinet of Singapore by Prime Minister Lawrence Wong.

== Other appointments ==
- Board Member, Monetary Authority of Singapore (29 Aug 2016 – 31 May 2019)
- Board Member, SMRT Corporation (2006–2014) As an independent director, he was appointed to head an internal investigation into the major train disruptions between 15 and 17 December 2011.
- Chairman, Employment and Employability Institute
- Adviser, National Transport Workers' Union (NTWU), Singapore Industrial and Services Employees’ Union (SISEU), and Attractions, Resorts & Entertainment Union (AREU)
- Executive Secretary, National Transport Workers' Union and the Singapore Manual and Mercantile Workers' Union.

== Personal life ==
Ong's father, Ong Lian Teng, was a Barisan Sosialis politician who served as the Member of the Legislative Assembly for Bukit Panjang between 1963 and 1965 and later MP between 1965 and 1966, when he resigned to protest the "undemocratic acts" of the PAP government. In an interview with The Straits Times in 2011, Ong Ye Kung said that his father, who died in 2009, had been fully supportive of his son's entry into PAP politics despite his own involvement in opposition politics.

Ong is married to Diana Kuik Sin Leng, the daughter of real estate magnate Kuik Ah Han. They have two daughters. In 2012, Straits Times correspondent Susan Long described him as a "free thinker" and a "Confucius-quoting unionist".

Ong's older brother, Howard, is an Australian political candidate and businessman. He contested and lost in the Division of Tangney under the Liberal Party ticket in the 2025 federal election.

Ong's maternal cousin, Xie Yao Quan, is the PAP MP for Jurong Central Single Member Constituency (SMC).

== Honours ==
- Public Administration Medal (Silver), in 2007.

== Notes ==
Political offices
Preceded by Heng Swee Keat	Minister for Education; 2018–2020; 2016–2018 (Higher Education and Skills); Acting: 2015–2016; Served alongside: Ng Chee Meng (Schools)	Succeeded by Lawrence Wong
Preceded by Khaw Boon Wan	Minister for Transport; 2020–2021	Succeeded by S. Iswaran
Preceded by Gan Kim Yong	Minister for Health; 2021–present	Incumbent
Vacant Title last held by Tharman Shanmugaratnam; 2023	Coordinating Minister for Social Policies; 2025–present	Incumbent
Parliament of Singapore
Preceded by Vikram Nair; Hawazi Daipi; Khaw Boon Wan; Ellen Lee; Ong Teng Koon	Member of Parliament for Sembawang GRC; 2015–present Served alongside: (2015-2020): Lim Wee Kiak, Vikram Nair, Khaw Boon Wan, Amrin Amin (2020-2025): Lim Wee Kiak, Vikram Nair, Poh Li San, Mariam Jaafar (2025-present): Gabriel Lam, Ng Shi Xuan, Vikram Nair, Mariam Jaafar	Incumbent
