= Chin Tet Yung =

Singaporean politician

Chin Tet Yung (Note: Chinese: 陈德镛; Pha̍k-fa-sṳ: Chhṳ̀n Tet-yung; pinyin: Chén Déyōng) (born 2 August 1951) is a Singaporean former Member of Parliament for Sembawang Group Representation Constituency (GRC), and also served previously as the chairman of the Government Parliamentary Committee for Home Affairs and Law from 2002 to 2005. He had been a Member of Parliament from 23 December 1996 to 20 April 2006.

He announced his retirement from politics on 10 April 2006.

== Early life and education ==
Chin was born on 2 August 1951 in Sabah, Malaysia. His father was a businessman and his mother, a school teacher.

Chin studied at London School of Economics (LSE) and graduated with a law degree in 1973. He also studied postgraduate in law from University of Oxford and also has a postgraduate diploma in economics from LSE.

== Academic career ==
Chin started teaching law as a lecturer at the law faculty of the National University of Singapore (NUS) in 1975. He served as the dean of the law faculty between 1992 and 2001. He still teaches law at NUS as an emeritus professor.

== Political career ==
Chin joined the PAP and stood for elections in 1997 and 2001, both in Sembawang GRC and won on both occasions.

== Personal life ==
Chin came to Singapore in 1975 and became a Singapore citizen in 1987.

Chin married a legal officer working with the Singapore government. They have a son and a daughter.
