= James Gomez (politician) =

Singaporean politician

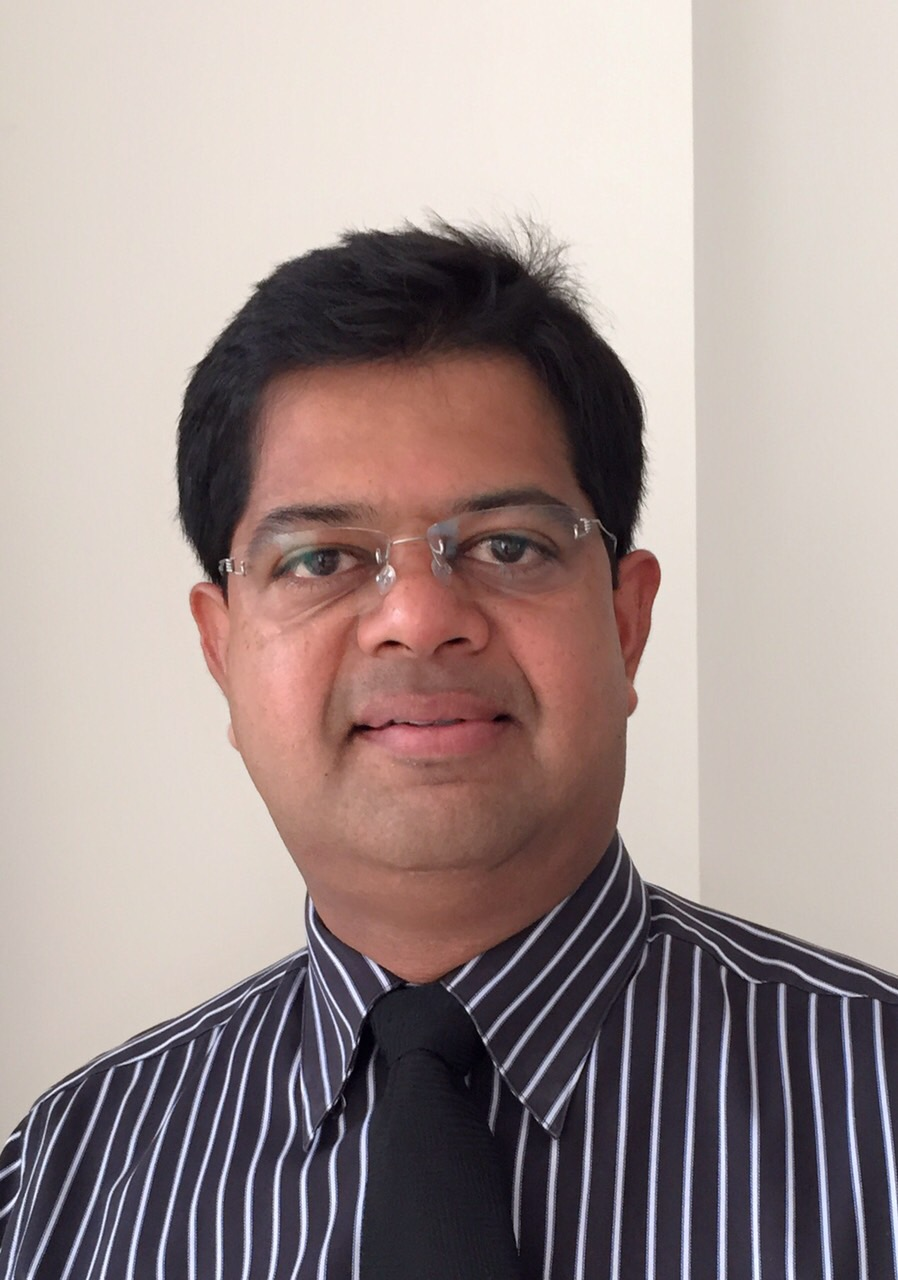

Founding Director (Asia Centre)

Personal details
- Born: 10 January 1965 (age 61) Singapore
- Party: Singapore Democratic Party (2010-present)
- Other political affiliations: Workers' Party (2001-2006)
- Education: National University of Singapore; University of Essex; Monash University
- Profession: Academic
- Website: Asia Centre

James Gomez (born 10 January 1965) is a Singaporean academic, politician and a member of the Singapore Democratic Party.

== Education ==
Gomez studied at Serangoon Secondary School and Nanyang Junior College before going on to the National University of Singapore (NUS) from 1988 to 1992, where he graduated with a Bachelor of Science (Honours) degree in Political Science. He then completed a Master of Arts degree in Politics and Human Rights at the University of Essex in the United Kingdom in 1994.

In 2004, Gomez began studying for a Ph.D. at the Monash Asia Institute of Monash University in Australia.

== Career ==
=== Academic career ===
Gomez was appointed as a visiting associate at the Institute of Southeast Asian Studies in Singapore in 1995, and was as a visiting researcher at the National Institute of Education Centre for Research in 1997–98.

Gomez began working for the Friedrich Naumann Foundation in Asia in 1996. He also continued his interest in academia through several research organisations and tertiary institutions. He was a visiting fellow at the Media and Communications Department at the Hong Kong Baptist University in 2002, and also presented guest seminars at the University of Hong Kong. From 2002 to 2004, he co-ordinated and guest lectured on a course on International Ethics and Human Rights at Thammasat University in Thailand, and was also an Adjunct Lecturer on the Human Rights Programme at Thailand's Mahidol University.

Gomez has previously been the deputy associate dean (international) at the School of Humanities, Communications and Social Sciences at Monash University (Australia) and has lectured and conducted research at various tertiary institutions, including Thammasat University (Thailand), Mahidol University (Thailand) Universiti Utara Malaysia, Keio University (Japan) and United International College (China). Gomez was also a programme officer at the International Institute for Democracy and Electoral Assistance in Sweden, and a research and project manager for the Friedrich Naumann Foundation.

He is presently professor of communications and associate dean (international affairs) at the School of Communication Arts, Bangkok University, Thailand. In 2015, he founded the Asia Centre, a regional educational enterprise based in Bangkok, Thailand since 2010. He also served as the executive director of Singaporeans for Democracy (a former non-governmental organisation) from 2010 to 2012.

Gomez also worked as a programme officer at the International Institute for Democracy and Electoral Assistance in Sweden from 2006 to 2008. From 2008 to 2009, Gomez was a visiting scholar in the Department of Political Science at Keio University in Japan. In between May 2009 to end May 2011 Gomez was the deputy associate dean (international) and head of public relations at the School of Humanities, Communications and Social Sciences at Monash University.

Gomez was a founding editor of Think Centre (an NGO which works on democracy, rule of law and human rights issues in Singapore) and served as the Executive Directory of Singaporeans for Democracy (a former human rights NGO). During 2015, Gomez co-founded the Asia Centre, an educational enterprise based in Bangkok that seeks to connect peoples and regions through collaborative partnerships.

Gomez presently serves on the editorial board of Asia Rights, an online journal of human rights produced by the Research School of Pacific and Asian Studies (RSPAS) at the Australian National University.

His first book was Self Censorship: Singapore's Shame (1999). He then went on to write Internet Politics: Surveillance and Intermediation in Singapore.

=== Political career ===
==== Workers' Party ====
Gomez joined the Workers' Party (WP) in 2001. He was a member of the Workers' Party team which attempted to contest the Aljunied Group Representation Constituency (GRC) at the 2001 general election, but were disqualified because their nomination papers were incomplete. The name of the GRC they were intending to contest had not been written down on the form.

During the 2006 Singaporean general election, Gomez stood as a member of the Workers' Party's team in the Aljunied GRC at the election. In the lead up to the election, Gomez claimed that he had submitted his minority-race candidate's application form during a visit to the Elections Department with WP chairman Sylvia Lim on 24 April (All the candidates in a GRC must have at least one of the candidates must be a person belonging to the Malay, Indian or some other minority community). Two days later, Gomez called in at the Elections Department to enquire about the status of the form. which he was informed that they had not received his form, and he told an officer from the department that there would be "consequences" if it had been misplaced. The following day, the Elections Department confirmed that their closed-circuit television footage had revealed that Gomez had in fact put the form in his bag and left the building without submitting it.

On 29 April 2006, Gomez apologised after the release of the CCTV evidence and admitted that he had not filed his application, contrary to his earlier claims. He said that he had been distracted by his busy schedule. His failure to submit the form did not prevent the Workers' Party team from running in Aljunied GRC because they had a second minority candidate on their team, Mohammed Rahizan bin Yaacob, who had submitted the required paperwork.

PAP candidate Inderjit Singh speculated that Gomez's non-submission of the form may have been an intentional ploy to try to gain publicity and cause confusion. Gomez responded by insisting that he had made a genuine mistake and called for others to "move on" from the issue. On the eve of polling day, the WP leader, Low Thia Khiang, backed Gomez and stated that "the incident was merely an unintentional omission, a mistake made while busy". However Deputy Prime Minister Wong Kan Seng said that the facts showed that Gomez had lied.

On polling day, Gomez and his Workers' Party colleagues in Aljunied GRC lost to the PAP's team by 56,593 votes (43.9%) to 74,843 (56.1%). This was the highest percentage of the vote garnered by any opposition losing candidates, and was therefore enough to secure one of the team's members a seat as a Non-Constituency Member of Parliament (NCMP). Lim took up the NCMP seat.

Immediately after the election, the Elections Department filed a complaint about Gomez threatening a member of their staff by saying there would be "consequences" if his form has been lost.

On 8 May, two days after the election, Gomez was stopped by police at Changi Airport and prevented from boarding a flight to Stockholm (where he worked at the time for the International Institute for Democracy and Electoral Assistance). He was held for questioning over whether he had committed criminal intimidation in his dealings with the Elections Department. Gomez and other members of the Workers' Party, including Low and Lim, were questioned regarding the issue. On 9 May, Gomez was questioned for a second time for five hours, and for a third time on 10 May for three hours. Meanwhile, Low assured police that there would be full co-operation with the police on the matter.

In the end, Gomez was let off with a "stern warning" regarding the incident. The police maintained that there had been "several serious inconsistencies" in the account of events that Gomez had given. However the public prosecutor stated that the willingness of Gomez to co-operate with the police and his lack of a previous criminal record led to the decision. Following this, former Prime Minister Lee Kuan Yew said that the decision not to prosecute did not make Gomez any less dishonest and called him a "bad egg".

==== Singapore Democratic Party ====
Gomez joined the Singapore Democratic Party (SDP) in November 2010.

At the 2011 general election, Gomez stood as an SDP candidate in the Sembawang GRC. The SDP's team was defeated by the team from the PAP by 63.9% of the votes to 36.1%.

In 2015, Gomez along with other Singaporean activists, nominated Chia Thye Poh for the Nobel Peace Prize, in recognition of the 32 years Dr Chia spent as a prisoner of conscience and his pioneering work of speaking up for political and other freedoms in Singapore.

At the 2020 general election, Gomez stood as an SDP candidate in Holland-Bukit Timah GRC. The SDP team received 33.6% of the votes to the PAP's 66.4%.

On 6 April 2025, Gomez was announced as an SDP candidate for Sembawang GRC for the 2025 general election. The SDP team received 29.93% of the vote against the PAP team which received 67.75% of the vote and the NSP team which received 2.32% of the vote.

== Personal life ==
Gomez was born in 1965. His father, Thomas Vincent Gomez, was a founder and prominent member of the Singapore Manual and Mercantile Worker's Union (SMMWU).
