= Ellen Lee =

Singaporean politician

Member of the Singapore Parliament for Sembawang GRC (Woodlands)
- In office 6 May 2006 – 25 August 2015
- Preceded by: Chin Tet Yung
- Succeeded by: Amrin Amin

Personal details
- Born: Ellen Lee Geck Hoon; 13 April 1957 (age 69) Colony of Singapore
- Party: People's Action Party

Ellen Lee Geck Hoon (Chinese: 李玉云; pinyin: Lǐ Yùyún; born 13 April 1957) is a former politician in Singapore. A member of the governing People's Action Party (PAP), she was the Member of Parliament (MP) for the Sembawang Group Representation Constituency for Woodlands ward from 27 April 2006 to 11 September 2015. She also holds a job at Singaporean law firm Ramdas and Wong. She replaced Chin Tet Yung as the MP for Sembawang Group Representation Constituency on 27 April 2006 and was succeeded by Amrin Amin on 11 September 2015.

== Early life and education ==
Lee was born in Singapore on 13 April 1957. She attended the Toa Payoh-based CHIJ Primary in 1963 and later CHIJ Secondary. After completing her GCE Advanced Level examinations, Lee went on to study at the National University of Singapore, graduated in 1980 with a Bachelor of Laws degree.

== Career ==
Lee began her professional law career at law firm Messrs Lim Kiap Khee & Co, starting out as a legal assistant in January 1981. Rising up the ranks, she was promoted to Sole Proprietor in October 1984. Lee left the company in September 2005. Since October 2005, she has been working at Ramdas & Wong as a law consultant, her area of expertise being, among others, family law, adoption and custody of children, bankruptcy and insolvency law, corporate and commercial law, conveyancing and property law, and immigration law. Lee enjoyed a decade's stint as chairperson of the Singapore Law Society's Family Law Practice Committee.

In 1997, the Pingat Bakti Masyarakat (Malay for Public Service Medal) was bestowed upon Lee. A member of the ruling People's Action Party, Lee served as an MP for the Sembawang GRC. She has held this position since May 2006. She was also appointed as the Deputy Chairman of both the Singapore-Turkey parliamentary Friendship Group and the Government Parliamentary Committee for Defence and Foreign Affairs.

== Personal life ==
Lee is married. Her religion is Taoism.

== See also ==
- List of Singapore MPs
- List of current Singapore MPs
