= Sembawang Group Representation Constituency =

Electoral division in Singapore

Sembawang
- Group Representation constituency for the Parliament of Singapore
- Region: North Region, Singapore
- Electorate: 134,157

Current constituency
- Created: 1988; 38 years ago
- Seats: 5
- Party: People's Action Party
- Members: Gabriel Lam; Mariam Jaafar; Ng Shi Xuan; Ong Ye Kung; Vikram Nair
- Town Council: Sembawang
- Created from: Sembawang Constituency; Nee Soon Constituency; Bukit Panjang Constituency

The Sembawang Group Representation Constituency is a five-member group representation constituency (GRC) in northern Singapore. It has five divisions: Admiralty, Canberra, Naval Base, Sembawang Central and Woodlands, managed by Sembawang Town Council. The current Members of Parliament (MPs) for the constituency are Gabriel Lam, Mariam Jaafar, Ng Shi Xuan, Coordinating Minister for Social Policies and Minister of Health Ong Ye Kung and Vikram Nair from the governing People's Action Party (PAP).

== History ==
=== Creation ===
From its creation until the 2006 general elections, the GRC was always uncontested. In the 2006 general elections, the Singapore Democratic Party led by Chee Soon Juan's sister Chee Siok Chin contested in the GRC against the PAP team led by Khaw Boon Wan in which the PAP team won with 76.7% against the SDP's 23.3%. In the 2011 general election, the PAP won against the SDP team led by former Workers' Party Aljunied GRC candidate James Gomez with a reduced majority of 63.9%. In the 2015 general elections, although the SDP did not contest in the GRC, the National Solidarity Party contested and the PAP won against the NSP with 72.3% of the vote. Prior to the 2020 general election, Khaw and Lim Wee Kiak retired, Amrin Amin moved to contest in Sengkang GRC unsuccessfully and Ong Ye Kung became the anchor minister for the PAP Sembawang GRC team. The PAP team proceeded to win with 67.3% of the vote.

=== 2025 general election ===
For the 2025 general election, the majority of the residential area of Sembawang West ward was carved out of the GRC to form a new Sembawang West Single Member Constituency (SMC) in order to reduce the number of voters in the GRC.

In the same year, the National Solidarity Party (NSP) and the Singapore Democratic Party (SDP) entered talks hoping to avert a three-cornered fight in the GRC. However, on 12 April, both parties were unable to come to an agreement as NSP rejected SDP's proposal for NSP to instead contest in Holland–Bukit Timah.

Due to the creation of Sembawang West SMC, Poh Li San, left the GRC team to stand for reelection alone. A reconfigured PAP team defeated SDP with 67.75% of the vote to the SDP's 29.93%, while the NSP lost their deposit with 2.32% of the vote.

== Members of Parliament ==
Divisions or wards of Sembawang GRC as of the 2025 general election:
1 Admiralty
2 Canberra
3 Naval Base
4 Sembawang Central
5 Woodlands (part)
6 Woodlands (part)

Year	Division	Members of Parliament	Party
Formation
1988	Chong Pang; Nee Soon East; Sembawang	K. Shanmugam; Charles Chong; Tony Tan	PAP
1991	Bukit Panjang; Chong Pang; Nee Soon East; Sembawang	Lee Yiok Seng; K. Shanmugam; Ho Peng Kee; Tony Tan	PAP
1997	Bukit Panjang; Chong Pang; Marsiling; Nee Soon East; Sembawang; Woodlands	Teo Ho Pin; K. Shanmugam; Hawazi Daipi; Ho Peng Kee; Tony Tan; Chin Tet Yung	PAP
2001	Admiralty; Canberra; Chong Pang; Marsiling; Sembawang; Woodlands	Maliki Osman; Warren Lee; K. Shanmugam; Hawazi Daipi; Tony Tan; Chin Tet Yung	PAP
2006	Admiralty; Canberra; Chong Pang; Marsiling; Sembawang; Woodlands	Maliki Osman; Lim Wee Kiak; K. Shanmugam; Hawazi Daipi; Khaw Boon Wan; Ellen Lee	PAP
2011	Admiralty; Marsiling; Sembawang; Woodlands; Woodgrove	Vikram Nair; Hawazi Daipi; Khaw Boon Wan; Ellen Lee; Ong Teng Koon	PAP
2015	Admiralty; Canberra; Gambas; Sembawang; Woodlands	Vikram Nair; Lim Wee Kiak; Ong Ye Kung; Khaw Boon Wan; Amrin Amin	PAP
2020	Admiralty; Canberra; Sembawang Central; Sembawang West; Woodlands	Vikram Nair; Lim Wee Kiak; Ong Ye Kung; Poh Li San; Mariam Jaafar	PAP
2025	Admiralty; Canberra; Naval Base; Sembawang Central; Woodlands	Vikram Nair; Gabriel Lam; Ng Shi Xuan; Ong Ye Kung; Mariam Jaafar	PAP

== Electoral results ==
Note: The Elections Department does not include rejected votes when calculating the vote shares of candidates. Hence, all candidates' vote shares will total to 100% at any given election (may not appear so in multi-way contests due to rounding).

=== Elections in 1980s ===
General Election 1988
Party	Candidate	Votes	%	±%
PAP	K Shanmugam; Charles Chong; Tony Tan	Unopposed		
Registered electors		55,633		
PAP win (new seat)				

=== Elections in 1990s ===
General Election 1991
Party	Candidate	Votes	%	±%
PAP	Lee Yiok Seng; K Shanmugam; Ho Peng Kee; Tony Tan	Unopposed		
Registered electors		117,951		▲112.02
PAP hold				

General Election 1997
Party	Candidate	Votes	%	±%
PAP	Chin Tet Yung; Hawazi Daipi; Ho Peng Kee; K Shanmugam; Teo Ho Pin; Tony Tan<	Unopposed		
Registered electors		154,402		▲30.90
PAP hold				

=== Elections in 2000s ===
General Election 2001
Party	Candidate	Votes	%	±%
PAP	Chin Tet Yung; Hawazi Daipi; Mohd Maliki Osman; K Shanmugam; Tony Tan; Warren Lee	Unopposed		
Registered electors		166,137		▲7.60
PAP hold				

General Election 2006
Party	Candidate	Votes	%	±%
PAP	Ellen Lee Hawazi Daipi Lim Wee Kiak Mohd Maliki Osman Khaw Boon Wan K Shanmugam	130,170	76.70	N/A
SDP	Chee Siok Chin Christopher Neo Ting Wei Francis Yong Chu Leong Gerald Sng Choon Guan Mohd Isa Abdul Aziz Narayanasamy Gogelavany	39,537	23.30	N/A
Majority		90,633	53.40	N/A
Total valid votes		169,707	96.87	N/A
Rejected ballots		5,487	3.13	N/A
Turnout		175,194	94.80	N/A
Registered electors		184,804		▲11.24
PAP hold		Swing	N/A	

=== Elections in 2010s ===
General Election 2011
Party	Candidate	Votes	%	±%
PAP	Ellen Lee Hawazi Daipi Khaw Boon Wan Ong Teng Koon Vikram Nair	84,252	63.90	▼12.8
SDP	James Gomez Jarrod Luo John Tan Mohd Isa Aziz Sadasivam Veriyah	47,605	36.10	▲12.8
Majority		36,647	27.80	
Turnout		135,148	94.87	▲0.07
PAP hold		Swing	▼12.8	

General Election 2015
Party	Candidate	Votes	%	±%
PAP	Amrin Amin Lim Wee Kiak Khaw Boon Wan Ong Ye Kung Vikram Nair	96,639	72.28	▲8.38
NSP	Abdul Rasheed S/O Y Abdul Kuthus Eugene Yeo Kevryn Lim Spencer Ng Yadzeth Bin Haris	37,067	27.72	N/A
Majority		59,572	44.56	▲16.7
Rejected ballots		3,796	2.76	▲0.32
Turnout		137,502	95.04	▲0.17
PAP hold		Swing	▲8.38	

=== Elections in 2020s ===
General Election 2020
Party	Candidate	Votes	%	±%
PAP	Lim Wee Kiak Mariam Jaafar Ong Ye Kung Poh Li San Vikram Nair	94,176	67.29	▼4.99
NSP	Ivan Yeo Tiong Boon Sathin Ravindran Sebastian Teo Spencer Ng Yadzeth Hairis	45,778	32.71	▲4.99
Majority		48,398	34.58	▼9.92
Total valid votes		139,954	97.94	▲0.70
Rejected ballots		2,948	2.06	▼0.70
Turnout		142,902	96.64	▲1.60
Registered electors		147,786		
PAP hold		Swing	▼4.99	

General Election 2025
Party	Candidate	Votes	%	±%
PAP	Gabriel Lam Mariam Jaafar Ng Shi Xuan Ong Ye Kung Vikram Nair	84,159	67.76	▲0.47
SDP	Alfred Tan Bryan Lim Damanhuri Abas James Gomez Surayah Akbar	37,157	29.92	N/A
NSP	Raiyan Chia Lee Wei Spencer Ng Verina Ong Yadzeth Hairis	2,878	2.32	▼30.39
Majority		47,002	37.84	▲3.26
Total valid votes		124,194	98.53	▲0.59
Rejected ballots		1,848	1.47	▼0.59
Turnout		126,042	93.95	▼2.69
Registered electors		134,157		▼9.22
PAP hold		Swing	▲0.47	
