= Khaw Boon Wan =

Singaporean politician

- 许文远
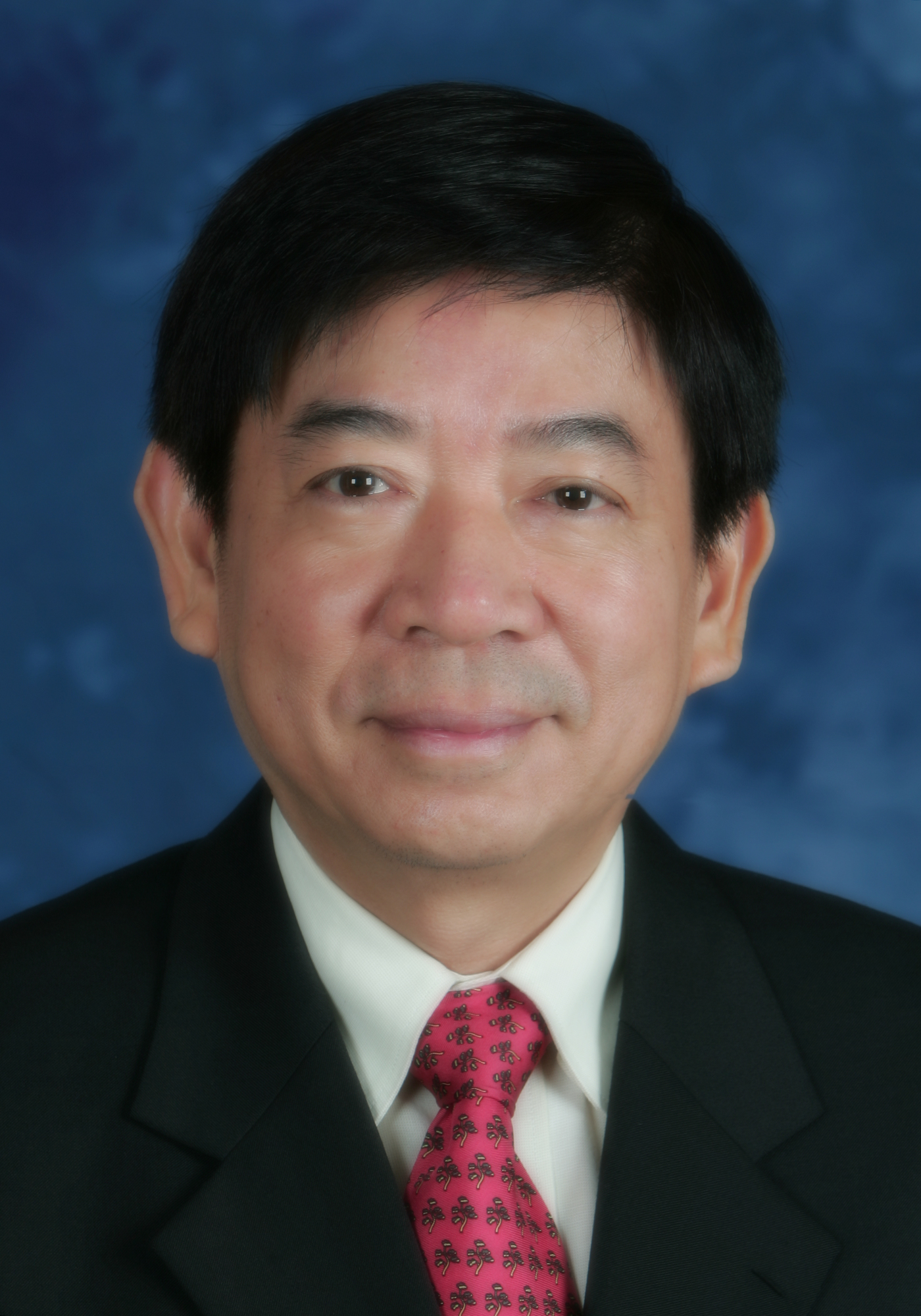
- Official portrait, 2008

Minister for Transport
- In office 6 April 2019 – 26 July 2020
- Prime Minister: Lee Hsien Loong
- Preceded by: Vivian Balakrishnan (acting)
- Succeeded by: Ong Ye Kung
- In office 1 October 2015 – 28 February 2019
- Prime Minister: Lee Hsien Loong
- Second Minister: Ng Chee Meng (2016–2018)
- Preceded by: Lui Tuck Yew
- Succeeded by: Vivian Balakrishnan (acting)

Coordinating Minister for Infrastructure
- In office 1 October 2015 – 26 July 2020
- Preceded by: Office established
- Succeeded by: Office abolished

5th Chairman of the People's Action Party
- In office 1 June 2011 – 23 November 2018
- Preceded by: Lim Boon Heng
- Succeeded by: Gan Kim Yong

Minister for National Development
- In office 21 May 2011 – 30 September 2015
- Prime Minister: Lee Hsien Loong
- Preceded by: Mah Bow Tan
- Succeeded by: Lawrence Wong

Minister for Health
- In office 12 August 2004 – 20 May 2011; Acting: 1 August 2003 – 11 August 2004
- Prime Minister: Goh Chok Tong; Lee Hsien Loong
- Preceded by: Lim Hng Kiang
- Succeeded by: Gan Kim Yong

Member of the Singapore Parliament for Sembawang GRC
- In office 7 May 2006 – 23 June 2020
- Preceded by: PAP held
- Succeeded by: PAP held

Member of the Singapore Parliament for Tanjong Pagar GRC
- In office 25 October 2001 – 20 April 2006
- Preceded by: PAP held
- Succeeded by: PAP held

Personal details
- Born: Khaw Boon Wan; 8 December 1952 (age 73) Penang, Malaya
- Citizenship: Malaysia (until 1980s); Singapore (since 1980s)
- Party: People's Action Party
- Spouse: Jean Khaw
- Children: 3
- Education: University of Newcastle (BEng, BCom); National University of Singapore (MS)

Khaw Boon Wan (Note: Chinese: 许文远; Pe̍h-ōe-jī: Khó͘ Bûn-oán; pinyin: Xǔ Wényuǎn) (born 8 December 1952) is a Singaporean former politician who served as Minister for Transport between 2015 and 2020, Minister for National Development between 2011 and 2015, and Minister for Health between 2003 and 2011. A member of the governing People's Action Party (PAP), he was the Member of Parliament (MP) for the Moulmein division of Tanjong Pagar Group Representation Constituency (GRC) between 2001 and 2006, and the Sembawang division of Sembawang GRC between 2006 and 2020.

In 2021, Khaw was appointed the chairperson of SPH Media Trust, a not-for-profit media entity set up by Singapore Press Holdings (SPH) after it underwent a restructuring of its media operations that year.

During his political career, Khaw received the moniker "Mr. Fix-it", being noted for his appointment to ministerial portfolios related to wedge issues, such as housing and transport.

== Early life and education ==
Born in Penang to a Malaysian Chinese family, Khaw was the seventh of eight children.

Khaw attended and graduated from Chung Ling High School. In 1973, he was awarded the Colombo Plan scholarship from the Ministry of Education to study a combined degree programme in engineering and commerce at the University of Newcastle in Australia. He graduated in 1977 with a Bachelor of Engineering (Honours Class I) degree and Bachelor of Commerce degree.

Khaw moved to Singapore in 1977 and later went on to complete a Master of Science degree in industrial engineering from the National University of Singapore in 1982.

He was awarded Doctor of Engineering honoris causa from the University of Newcastle in 2002.

== Civil career ==
Khaw began his career in the Singapore Civil Service, working at the Ministry of Health. From 1985 to 1987, Khaw served as the first chief executive officer of the National University Hospital (NUH). He also worked in the KK Women's and Children's Hospital, and the Singapore General Hospital (SGH).

From 1992 to 1995, Khaw served as the Principal Private Secretary to Prime Minister Goh Chok Tong and from 1995 to 2001, he served as the permanent secretary at the Ministry of Trade and Industry.

== Political career ==
Khaw was elected Member of Parliament (MP) as part of a PAP team for Tanjong Pagar GRC in 2001. Subsequently he was moved to Sembawang GRC in 2006 where he was reelected as an MP, as part of a PAP team. He continued to be elected as one of the MPs for the GRC till 2020.

From February to June 2003, Khaw played a key role in combating the SARS pandemic that happened while he was Senior Minister of State for Health, which put a strain on and tested Singapore's public health resources. Then, Khaw took over as acting Health Minister from 1 August 2003 before being promoted to a full Minister on 12 August 2004 in the new prime minister Lee Hsien Loong's cabinet.

Khaw is well known for having tackled thorny issues across various ministries over his nearly two-decade-long political career. In a valedictory letter to Khaw, Prime Minister Lee Hsien Loong noted that the veteran politician has helped Singapore overcome challenges spanning healthcare, housing and transport.

In 2011, Khaw took over outgoing Lim Boon Heng as the party's chairman, and in 2018 his role was taken over by Health Minister Gan Kim Yong.

=== Minister for Health (2004–2011) ===
Khaw was noted for his role in handling the National Kidney Foundation (NKF) scandal, and made Gerard Ee the new Chairman of the NKF following the resignation of T. T. Durai. Responding to a report by international auditing firm KPMG in Parliament in December 2005, Khaw vowed to punish all wrongdoers in the saga and heavily criticised NKF's "bizarre HR policies".

In a parliamentary speech on 9 February 2009, in the context of tackling the rising healthcare costs, Khaw suggested that Singaporeans can consider sending their elderly parents to nursing homes in Johor Bahru in Malaysia, which is a developing country located close to Singapore. This was quoted by news reports and a public outcry ensued. Khaw subsequently clarified that his statement was quoted out of context by the media and his suggestion was only one of the many choices available to Singaporeans.

In 2010, Khaw wrote on his blog explaining that his heart bypass surgery had only cost him a mere SGD$8 in cash in a class A ward, as the rest of the cost was offset by payments combined from his universal Medishield account and private insurance. This sparked off a debate in the public sphere, with many questioning if an ordinary Singaporean had the means to pay for such high insurance premiums as he did in the first place. Members of the pro-PAP group, Silent No More, defended Khaw's claim and encouraged one another to rebut Internet users who had made jibes at Khaw.

=== Minister for National Development (2011–2015) ===
Following the 2011 general election where the ruling PAP garnered its lowest vote share of 60.1% since independence, Khaw was appointed the Minister for National Development. At a press conference, Prime Minister Lee Hsien Loong revealed that Khaw had volunteered for this new role as the public was extremely unhappy with the Government's housing policy, and Khaw felt that he had the ability to solve the problem. In his new appointment, Khaw assured the public that he will make housing affordable and accessible to all Singaporeans. In his 2013 budget debate, he said:

“We can now pause and see what else we can do to bring Build-to-Order (BTO) prices in non-mature estates to, say, around four years of salary as it was before the current property cycle started.”

Though the relative prices of Build To Order (BTO) flats have fallen since Khaw's speech, most of the flats still cost more than four years of an applicant's salary. The prices of new flats remain high despite six rounds of cooling measures. In January 2013, a seventh round of property cooling measures was introduced to moderate the increase in residential and industrial prices.

In July 2012, National Parks Board's (NParks) purchase of 26 Brompton bikes costing $2,200 each sparked a nationwide uproar after it was revealed by a whistleblower on online forum HardwareZone of possible corruption due numerous red flags in the way the procurement was done. Khaw, who initially defended NPark's purchase of the high-end foldable bikes, was criticised for handling the saga poorly. Subsequent investigation by the Corrupt Practices Investigation Bureau resulted in NParks assistant director Bernard Lim Yong Soon being fined $5,000 for lying to auditors about his relationship with the bicycle firm which was awarded the tender.

He also led the initiative to encourage cycling in the city state, such as through transforming the Park Connector Network for use by people on bikes as well as walking.

During a parliamentary session on 12 February 2015, Khaw spoke on the Auditor-General's findings on the opposition-run Aljunied–Hougang-Punggol East Town Council's alleged financial irregularities.

If an auditor makes such a finding on a listed company, it will immediately cause consternation among the shareholders, and a call for the removal of the CEO and the Board of Directors. In Japan, the Chairman and CEO would hold a press conference and take a deep bow. And in the good old days, they may even commit harakiri.

The quote on committing seppuku (harakiri) when top leaders make mistakes became part of Singapore's political lexicon as various irregularities and lapses of other government agencies started surfacing, along with the persistent train breakdowns under Khaw's Transportation portfolio in later years.

Khaw came under fire in 2015 when it was revealed that a site in Sengkang designated for religious use was awarded to a commercial company to develop a columbarium instead. Residents of an upcoming BTO public housing project in the vicinity demanded a refund as they did not know they would have to live next to a columbarium. Responding to opposition MP Lee Li Lian's questions in Parliament, Khaw acknowledged the oversight and used the Butterfly Lovers analogy to explain how "tender procedures have not caught up with time ... the (HDB) officers assessing the tender just assumed that it must be a company affiliated to some religious organisation". The columbarium plan was eventually aborted.

=== Minister for Transport (2015–2020) ===
On 28 September 2015, it was announced that Khaw will be the Co-ordinating Minister for Infrastructure as well as the Minister for Transport from 1 October 2015, taking over a portfolio that has been under heavy public scrutiny. Khaw wrote on his blog that he did not volunteer for the "thankless" job, but accepted it nevertheless as he put the nation's interest above his own. A key tenet of Khaw's transport policy is his vision of transforming Singapore into a car-lite city by 2030, which includes building a "smarter, greener and more inclusive transport system". He has stated publicly that 75% of trips should be made by public transport by 2030. Khaw has also advocated for the use of driverless buses to tackle the manpower crunch. Three towns in Singapore will introduce these new vehicles by 2022.

Khaw has had several run-ins with both the state and independent media. In one notable incident on 27 July 2017 at a forum on infrastructure management, Khaw stated that train reliability has improved three times since he took over. He was subsequently criticised online by commuters who had experienced persistent breakdowns in the same period. Khaw had derived his statistics based on preliminary data excluding all delays caused by re-signalling works. Khaw further berated the Singapore press for reporting extensively on the MRT breakdowns, criticizing them for "turning tabloid", "publishing frightening figures", and magnifying the problem to which he has no solution. He added that if solving the problem was as simple as "holding a pen and writing a few articles", members of the media should run the transport system instead and Singapore does not need any engineers.

As Minister of Transport, Khaw had indicated in March 2017 that public transportation fares were set to increase and a fare review will be conducted by the Public Transport Council (PTC). Rationalising the move, Khaw said that operating costs have been increasing, rendering the current fare structure "unsustainable" despite subsidies from the government. He further stressed the need to strike a "fair balance" in the proportion of transport costs between commuters, the government and the transport operators. His comments were subsequently met with discontent among the public, with many questioning if transport fare increases have been tied to service improvements, and whether there is a need for a fare hike when the transport operators have been generating profitable growth. On 7 March 2018, Khaw pushed for a review of the current fare formula and transfers. However, fares will be reviewed depending on the economic and market conditions. Currently, the "bus service must not be the same as the preceding bus service" is abolished and became a transfer.

==== FactWire exposé on defective trains ====
On 5 July 2016, Hong Kong based investigative news agency, FactWire broke news about 35 SMRT trains being secretively shipped back to China for repair by manufacturer CSR Sifang Locomotive & Rolling Stock Company Ltd. It was reported that cracks were found in the structure connecting the car body and the bogie. After remaining silent for a week, Khaw came out to explain that the cracks were not safety issues and that the news could result in “undue panic” during a briefing at the Bishan Depot. He criticised the news agency for mischief and even suggested that Singapore is a victim caught in the rivalry between political factions in Hong Kong and China.

FactWire noted that instead of taking responsibility for an incident which has damaged the Singaporean public's trust in the authorities, Khaw chose to blame the news agency for exposing the cover up. FactWire defended its reporting and denied allegations of political interference. In an open letter to Khaw on 14 July, the agency maintained that it is funded by the Hong Kong public and that its reporting is independent of commercial or political considerations.

==== Bishan MRT tunnel flooding ====
On the evening of 7 October 2017, the tunnels along the North–South MRT line (NSL) were flooded as a result of a malfunctioned pump, causing a 20 hours disruption. Khaw addressed the media 9 days later, holding the SMRT maintenance team responsible for failing Singaporeans. On 19 October 2017, the Singapore Democratic Party issued a strongly worded statement calling for Khaw to step down as Minister of Transport. In the letter, the party charged that Khaw has failed to stop the recurring breakdowns and other serious lapses all these years, signalling his incompetence and lack of leadership. It said, rather than shifting the blame to everyone else, as the Minister for Transport, he must take responsibility for the ongoing fiasco and resign.

Responding to mounting public pressure, Khaw delivered a 47-minute Ministerial Statement in Parliament on 7 November 2017. The parliamentary sitting was attended by SMRT's senior management, which included CEO Desmond Kuek and Chairman Seah Moon Ming. In his speech, Khaw revealed that anti-flooding pumps at Lavender and Kembangan stations were also found to be in non-serviceable condition, and maintenance records might have been falsified since 2016. Khaw disagreed with opposition chief Low Thia Khiang's charge that SMRT's main aim is to "make money for the government" at the expense of commuters, saying that "there are many other simpler ways to make money".

Khaw declined any shortcomings or lapses in regulatory oversight by LTA or MOT staff and dismissed proposals to form a committee of inquiry. A poll conducted by market research company Blackbox, however, showed that 69% of Singaporeans felt a public inquiry into the incident should have been held. In the same poll, more than half of Singaporeans felt SMRT CEO Desmond Kuek should resign. Defending Kuek's performance, Khaw said, "he wasn’t parachuted in or being asked to go and fix this, he volunteered for this job. As the former Chief of Defence Force, I know his heart is in the right place". However, members of the public questioned Khaw's choice of the word "volunteer" given that Kuek is paid $1.87 million per annum, and whether there is a proper selection process at SMRT given that Kuek, a former Singapore Armed Forces Lieutenant-General and civil servant, had no experience running a company in engineering or rail operations before joining SMRT.

Speaking at the inaugural Public Transport Workers Appreciation Day on 14 November 2017, Khaw further criticised SMRT's maintenance team responsible for the tunnel flooding, saying that they had "tarnished the reputation of Singapore and Singaporeans", and "brought disrepute" to other transport workers. The saga led to the sacking of 8 SMRT employees and legal action is expected to commence.

==== Joo Koon rail accident ====
An MRT train collided with another at Joo Koon station at approximately 0818 hours (SST) on 15 November 2017. It was initially reported that the accident caused 28 people to sustain injuries and they were taken to Ng Teng Fong General Hospital and the National University Hospital. Of the 28 injured, 2 were SMRT staff (including the driver) and 3 had to remain warded in hospital for observation. The collision caused massive delays on the East–West MRT line. More commuters sought treatment thereafter, which saw the number of injured rising to 38.

Speaking to the media hours after the accident occurred, Khaw said he was "deeply sorry" and it was "an awful day". It was revealed at a press conference that the collision occurred due to an "inadvertent removal" of a signalling software protection feature. Train services between Joo Koon and Tuas Link station had to be suspended for four days to allow signaling contractor Thales to conduct further assurance checks. The last train collision occurred over 2 decades ago in 1993 which resulted in 156 injured.

According to a statement from SMRT and LTA, the protective "bubble" around the first train was "unexpectedly disabled" when it passed a trackside device, which was not compatible with the new signalling system. The second train failed to keep safe distances from the first train as it moved forward automatically. Speaking to reporters at a press conference on 21 November, Khaw said that Thales, the provider of the new signalling system, "could have done better" to avoid the Joo Koon collision. Khaw asserts that if one disregards the collision and the flooding incident, SMRT was "actually making good progress" with regards to train operation.

== Personal life ==
Khaw is of Malaysian Chinese descent. He is a Buddhist and a self-professed "religious man". He met his wife in pre-university. They got married in Australia in his final year and settled in Singapore.

In 2010, Khaw underwent a heart bypass operation and after his recovery, it was reported that he had switched to a vegan diet, avoiding all meat, fish and dairy products. In March 2019, Khaw underwent an arm operation for a fracture that took place a month earlier During this period, Dr Vivian Balakrishnan took over the role as Acting Transport Minister. On 23 July 2020, Khaw was diagnosed with dengue fever after a sudden rise in temperature, his third time and was subsequently discharged two days later.

Khaw is also known to the public for his strikingly similar looks to Singaporean actor Henry Thia, a fact Thia often acknowledges by jokingly referring to Khaw as his twin.

== Honours ==
2019: Medal of Honour, National Trades Union Congress (NTUC), Singapore.

2022: Commander's Cross with Star of the Order of Merit, Republic of Poland.

2022: Key to the City of Newcastle, Australia.

== Notes ==
Political offices
Preceded by Lim Hng Kiang	Minister for Health; 2004 – 2011; Acting: 2003–2004	Succeeded by Gan Kim Yong
Preceded by Mah Bow Tan	Minister for National Development; 2011 – 2015	Succeeded by Lawrence Wong
New office	Co-ordinating Minister for Infrastructure; 2015 – 2020	Position abolished
Preceded by Lui Tuck Yew	Minister for Transport; 2015 – 2020	Succeeded by Ong Ye Kung
Parliament of Singapore
Preceded by R. Sinnakaruppan as MP, Kreta Ayer–Tanglin GRC (Moulmein)	Member of Parliament for Tanjong Pagar GRC (Moulmein); 2001 – 2006	Succeeded by Lui Tuck Yew
Preceded by Tony Tan	Member of Parliament for Sembawang GRC (Sembawang); 2006 – 2020	Succeeded by Poh Li San
Party political offices
Preceded by Lim Boon Heng	Chairman of the People's Action Party; 2011 – 2018	Succeeded by Gan Kim Yong
