= Amrin Amin =

Singaporean politician (born 1978)

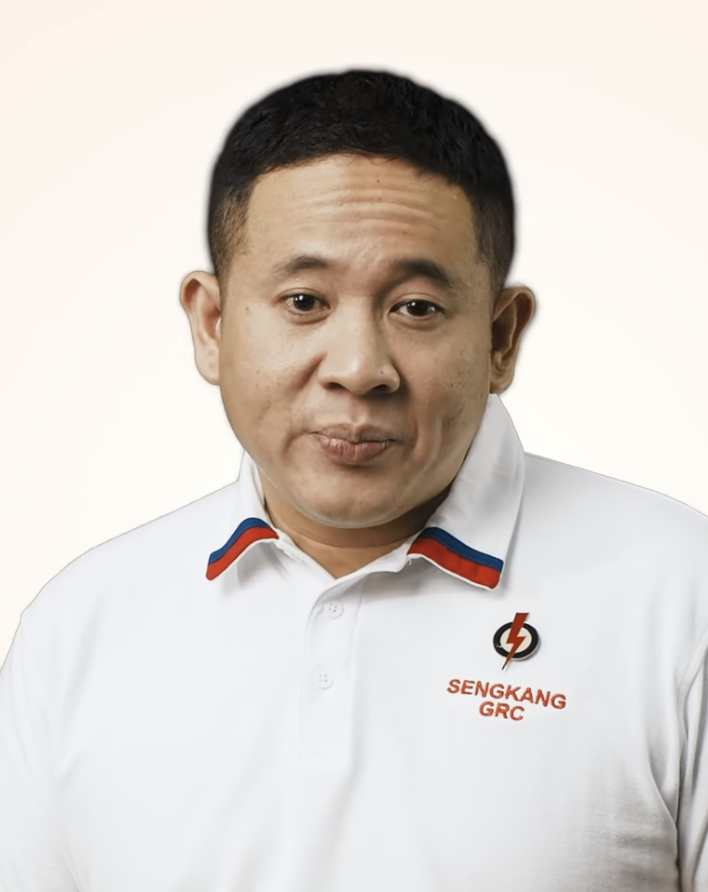
- Amrin in 2020

Senior Parliamentary Secretary for Home Affairs
- In office 1 May 2018 – 26 July 2020 Serving with Sun Xueling
- Prime Minister: Lee Hsien Loong
- Minister: K. Shanmugam

Senior Parliamentary Secretary for Health
- In office 1 May 2018 – 26 July 2020
- Prime Minister: Lee Hsien Loong
- Minister: Gan Kim Yong
- Succeeded by: Rahayu Mahzam

Parliamentary Secretary for Health
- In office 1 May 2017 – 30 April 2018
- Prime Minister: Lee Hsien Loong
- Minister: Gan Kim Yong

Parliamentary Secretary for Home Affairs
- In office 1 October 2015 – 30 April 2018
- Prime Minister: Lee Hsien Loong
- Minister: K. Shanmugam

Member of Parliament for Sembawang GRC
- In office 11 September 2015 – 23 June 2020
- Preceded by: PAP held
- Succeeded by: PAP held

Personal details
- Born: 5 October 1978 (age 48) Singapore
- Party: People's Action Party
- Spouse: Shariffah Nadia Aljunied
- Education: National University of Singapore (LLB); Columbia University (LLM)
- Profession: Solicitor; lawyer

Mohamed Amrin bin Mohamed Amin (born 5 October 1978) is a Singaporean solicitor, lawyer and politician. A member of the People's Action Party (PAP), he was the Member of Parliament (MP) of Sembawang Group Representation Constituency (GRC) between 2015 and 2020.

Amrin served as Parliamentary Secretary for Home Affairs between 2015 and 2018, and Parliamentary Secretary for Health between 2017 and 2018 and Senior Parliamentary Secretary for Home Affairs and Senior Parliamentary Secretary for Health concurrently between 2018 and 2020, .

== Education ==
Amrin attended Griffiths Primary School (now Angsana Primary School), Dunman Secondary School and Tampines Junior College before graduating from the National University of Singapore with a Bachelor of Laws degree.

He subsequently went on to complete a Master of Laws degree at Columbia University.

== Career ==
Amrin was a solicitor at Watson, Farley & Williams Asia Practice LLP, and was also a member of National Council on Problem Gambling as well as the governing board of Nanyang Polytechnic.

He was a partner at the corporate practice of Joseph Tan Jude Benny LLP between July and October 2015.

After his electoral defeat in Sengkang GRC during the 2020 general election, Amrin moved to the technology sector, and took up roles at two local firms in September 2020. He was appointed Strategy Director at robotics and automation firm Platform for Bots and Automation (PBA), and concurrently assumed a non-executive adviser position at ADERA Global, a company involved in data-security, artificial intelligence (AI), and automation.

== Political career ==
Amrin became a PAP activist in Sembawang GRC soon after the 2011 general election. He made his political debut in the 2015 general election as part of a four-member PAP team contesting in Sembawang GRC and won. He was subsequently appointed as Parliamentary Secretary for Home Affairs. During a Cabinet-reshuffle in 2015, he was appointed as Parliamentary Secretary for Health.

During the 2020 general election, Amrin contested in the newly created Sengkang GRC as part of a four-member PAP team, led by Minister in the Prime Minister's Office Ng Chee Meng. The PAP team lost to Workers' Party. He became the third PAP MP to lose re-election after a single term in Parliament, joining Ng Pock Too and Seet Ai Mee. This was the second instance of the PAP losing a GRC, since their loss in 2011 to the Worker's Party in Aljunied GRC.

Amrin continued as PAP branch chair of Sengkang Central from 2020 to 2022. In March 2022, he was replaced with Elmie Nekmat.

Parliament of Singapore
Preceded by Ellen Lee	Member of Parliament for Sembawang GRC; 2015 – 2020	Succeeded by Mariam Jaafar
