= Lim Wee Kiak =

Singaporean politician (born 1968)

Lim Wee Kiak PBM
- 林伟杰
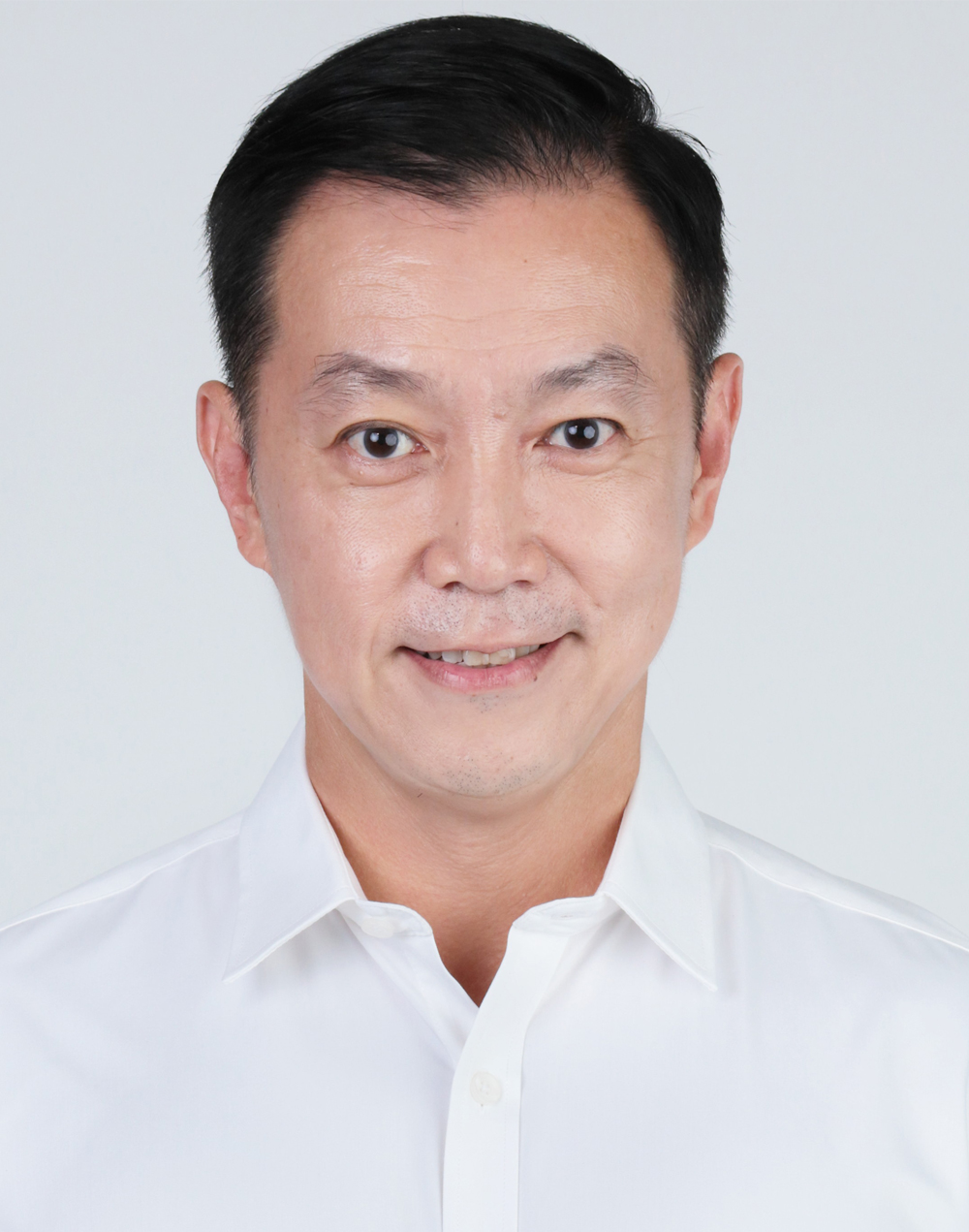
- Official portrait, 2021

Member of Parliament for Sembawang GRC
- In office 11 September 2015 – 15 April 2025
- Preceded by: PAP held
- Succeeded by: PAP held
- In office 6 May 2006 – 19 April 2011
- Preceded by: PAP held
- Succeeded by: PAP held

Member of Parliament for Nee Soon GRC
- In office 7 May 2011 – 24 August 2015
- Preceded by: Constituency established
- Succeeded by: PAP held

Personal details
- Born: 27 December 1968 (age 57) Singapore
- Party: People's Action Party
- Education: National University of Singapore (MBBS, MMed); Royal College of Surgeons in Edinburgh; Royal College of Ophthalmologists
- Occupation: Politician; ophthalmologist

Military service
- Branch/service: Singapore Armed Forces
- Years of service: 1995–2003
- Rank: Major
- Unit: SAF Medical Corps

Lim Wee Kiak PBM (Chinese: 林伟杰; pinyin: Lín Wěijié; born 27 December 1968) is a Singaporean ophthalmologist and retired politician. A member of the governing People's Action Party (PAP), he was the Member of Parliament (MP) for the Canberra division of Sembawang Group Representation Constituency (GRC) between 2006 and 2011, the same division in Nee Soon GRC between 2011 and 2015, and again the same division in Sembawang GRC between 2015 and 2025.

He retired from politics prior to the 2025 general election.

== Early life and education ==
Lim attended Sembawang School, The Chinese High School and Hwa Chong Junior College before graduating from Yong Loo Lin School of Medicine at the National University of Singapore in 1992 with a Bachelor of Medicine, Bachelor of Surgery degree.

After completing his housemanship, Lim served as a medical officer in the Ministry of Health (MOH) between 1992 and 1994. Lim then served in the Singapore Armed Forces (SAF) as a medical officer in 1994 before signing on as a regular.

Lim subsequently went on to complete a Master of Medicine degree in ophthalmology at Yong Loo Lin School of Medicine at the National University of Singapore. He went on to pursue two specialist postgraduate qualifications in ophthalmology from the Royal College of Surgeons of Edinburgh and Royal College of Ophthalmologists. Lim also did a one-year clinical and research fellowship in ocular immunology and inflammation at the National Eye Institute of the National Institutes of Health in 2003.

== Career ==
Lim is currently co-founder and group vice chairman of Eagle Eye Centre. Prior to joining Eagle Eye Centre, Lim was a consultant and a sub-specialist in ocular immunology and inflammation at the Singapore National Eye Centre. He is an adviser to the Singapore Opticianry Practitioners, chairman of the advisory board of the Ngee Ann Polytechnic School of Optometry. Lim is also a member of the International Uveitis Study Group, International Ocular Inflammation Society, and the American Uveitis Society.

Lim was the deputy director of the National Healthcare Group Eye Institute from 2007 to 2009. He was also a visiting consultant to the Singapore National Eye Centre from 2006 to 2017 and Tan Tock Seng Hospital from 2004 to 2019.

Lim has been an ophthalmologist since 1998 and provides specialised eye care for patients with common ophthalmological conditions such as cataract and short-sightedness and sub-specialist eye care for patients with ocular inflammation at his clinics at Mount Elizabeth Novena Hospital, Mount Alvernia Hospital, Parkway East Hospital and Royal Square Novena.

== Military career ==
Lim served in the Singapore Armed Forces between 1995 and 2003 as a medical officer before attaining the rank Major. He served as the team leader of the Singapore medical team attached to the United Nations Hospital in East Timor.

== Political career ==
Lim contested in the 2006 general election as part of a six-member People's Action Party (PAP) team for the Sembawang Group Representation Constituency (GRC). The team then led by Minister for Health Khaw Boon Wan, won over 76% of the votes. Lim was appointed to the Public Accounts Committee and chairman for the Transport Government Parliamentary Committee.

During the 2011 general election, the Canberra division was carved out from Sembawang GRC to form part of the newly created Nee Soon GRC. Lim then contested as part of a five-member PAP team for Nee Soon GRC. The PAP team, led by the Minister for Law K. Shanmugam, won over 58% of the votes. Lim was appointed to the Public Petitions Committee. Lim was also appointed as a member of the Finance and Trade & Industry Government Parliamentary Committee. Subsequently, Lim became Chairman of the Defence and Foreign Affairs Government Parliamentary Committee.

During an interview with Lianhe Zaobao in May 2011, Lim commented that Singapore's ministers need to have a high salary to maintain dignity when talking to CEOs or the CEOs may not be receptive to the ministers' suggestion or proposals. The comments created a outcry and Lim defended himself saying a balance point is needed. Lim subsequently apologized for it, claiming it was taken out of context and there are several more points to it during the interview.

During the 2015 general election, the Canberra division was moved back to Sembawang GRC. As a result, Lim contested Sembawang GRC again as part of a five-member PAP team led by Minister for National Development Khaw. The team won over 72% of the votes. Lim was appointed to the Public Accounts Committee and made chairperson for the Culture, Community, and Youth Government Parliamentary Committee.

During the 2020 general election, Lim successfully defended his seat in Sembawang GRC as part of a five-member team led by Minister for Education Ong Ye Kung. The PAP team defeated the team by National Solidarity Party with 67.29% of the popular vote.

Prior to the 2025 Singaporean general election, on 13 April 2025, Ong announced that Lim will retire from politics. Lim cited that he wanted to spend time with his family.

== Personal life ==
Lim is married to Lee Ai Ling, who is the managing director of Eagle Eye Centre. They have three children.
