= Edward Chia =

Singaporean politician (born 1984)

The Honourable Edward Chia
- 谢秉辉
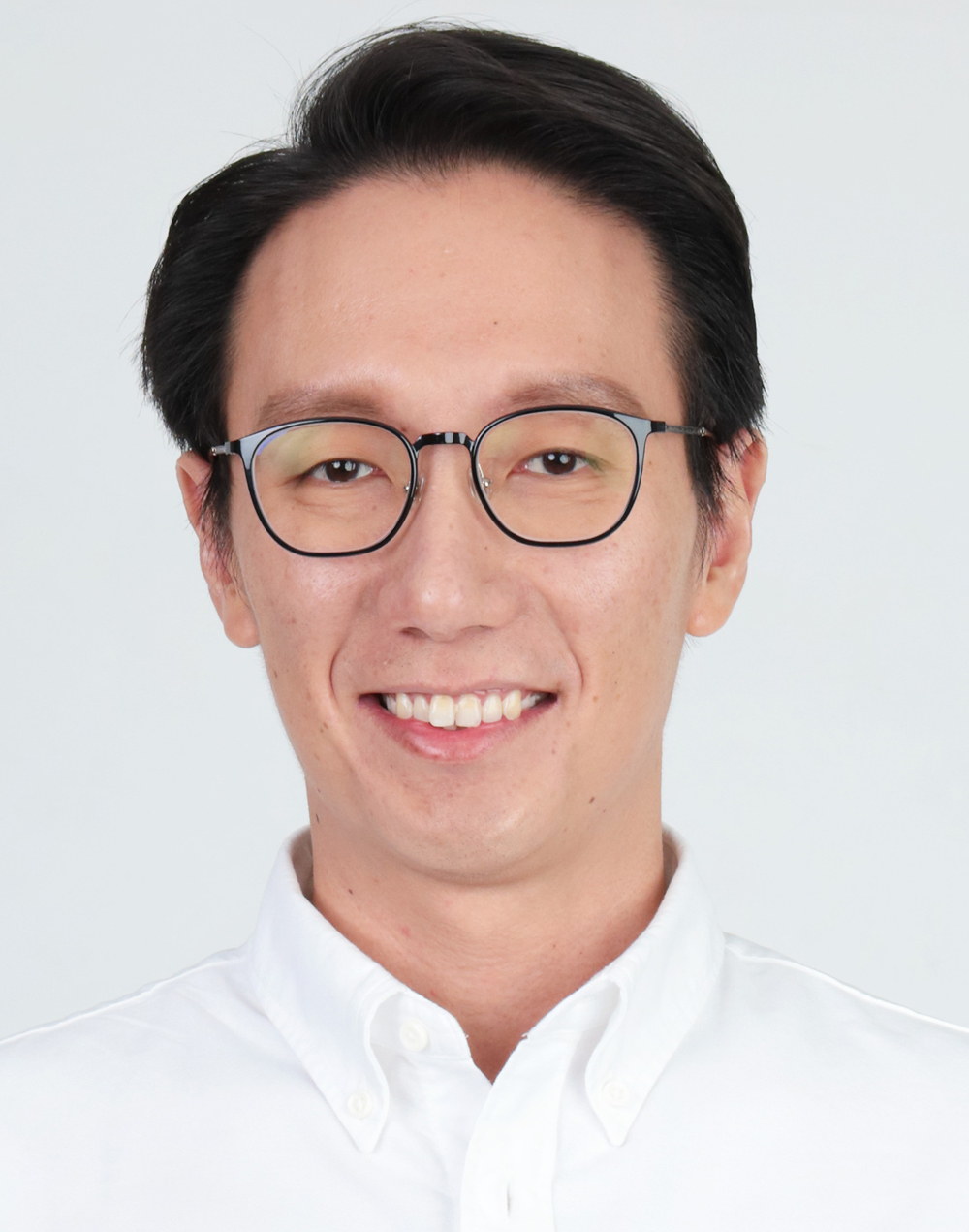
- Official portrait, 2021

Member of Parliament for Holland–Bukit Timah GRC
- Incumbent
- Assumed office 10 July 2020
- Preceded by: Liang Eng Hwa
- Majority: 2020: 35,118 (32.72%); 2025: 64,174 (58.50%)

Personal details
- Born: Edward Chia Bing Hui; 17 February 1984 (age 42) Singapore
- Party: People's Action Party
- Children: 1
- Education: National University of Singapore (BA)
- Occupation: Politician; businessman

Edward Chia Bing Hui (Note: Chinese: 谢秉辉; Pe̍h-ōe-jī: Chiā Péng-hui; pinyin: Xiè Bǐnghuī) (born 17 February 1984) is a Singaporean politician and businessman. He has been a Member of Parliament for the People's Action Party, representing the Zhenghua division of Holland–Bukit Timah Group Representation Constituency, since 2020.

Chia co-founded the Timbre Group, but stepped down as a director and ceased being a shareholder in June 2021. Since then, Chia has been serving as the Managing Director of PlaceM and a Director at Feed the World.

Chia has been known to support and develop Singaporean musicians and culinary talents since 2005.

== Education ==
Chia attended National Junior College before graduating from the National University of Singapore in 2009 with a Bachelor of Arts degree in economics and political science.

== Business career ==
While studying at National Junior College, Chia founded Arts For Us All (AFUA), a defunct non-profit organization that engaged youths in arts-based community work and events.

Chia co-founded Timbre with Danny Loong in 2005, shortly before starting his undergraduate studies at the National University of Singapore. While studying in NUS, Chia was actively managing the business. Chia also founded placeM, a placemaking consultancy that helps property owners deliver meaningful urban transformations

Chia serves as a council member of the Ngee Ann Polytechnic, National Youth Achievement Award Council, a board member of SMU Enterprise and NP Enterprise Pte Ltd and the co-chair of the National Environment Agency (NEA) work group, which focuses on sustaining the hawker trade.

Since stepping down as director of Timbre, Chia has founded Life Lab Resources. There, Edward champions circular economy solutions by upcycling post-consumer food waste into nutritious, affordable, and sustainable aquaculture feed. This innovative model not only reduces carbon emissions but also supports farmers through circular supply chains.

== Political career ==
Chia was fielded in the 2020 general election to contest in the Holland–Bukit Timah GRC on the People's Action Party's ticket against the Singapore Democratic Party. Chia's running mates were Vivian Balakrishnan, Sim Ann, and Christopher de Souza. On 11 July 2020, Chia and the PAP team were declared elected Members of Parliament representing Holland–Bukit Timah GRC in the 14th Parliament after garnering 66.36% of the valid votes. Chia has served as the Vice-Chairman of the Holland-Bukit Panjang Town Council (HBPTC) since 2025.

Chia was then appointed as the Deputy Chairperson of Manpower Government Parliamentary Committee (GPC) in the 14th Parliament. He also sat on the Finance and Trade and Industry GPC.

Since his appointment as a Member of Parliament for Holland-Bukit Timah GRC, Chia has spoken in Parliament on the need for businesses to find ways to be sustainable and expand to provide more jobs for Singaporeans. As well as on the importance of helping companies upskill their employers and helping businesses grow their business.

In the Zhenghua ward, Chia worked with Vivian Balakrishnan and Liang Eng Hwa to launch a Bukit Panjang Town Jobs and Skills Support Taskforce which helped jobseekers secure employment. He also reached out to Food Bank Singapore to install vending machines to ease food insecurity for households and seniors who live in rental blocks or one- to two-room studio apartments. Chia is part of the Government Parliamentary Committee under Finance, and Trade and Industry and Transport where he serves as deputy chairman since 2025.

== Controversies ==
In April 2025, Chia faced criticism for a "fun fact" included in a campaign booklet in the lead up to the 2025 Singaporean general election. The booklet described him as someone who had bred and sold hamsters as a child, an activity that is illegal in Singapore under wildlife trafficking laws. He reportedly sold the hamsters to pet shops for S$3 each. The booklet framed this early venture as the beginning of a "lifelong passion for creating value" and the start of his entrepreneurial career. In response, Hamster Society Singapore criticised Chia's portrayal of his childhood activity, noting in an Instagram post that unlicensed breeding and selling of pets is illegal in Singapore.

== Personal life ==
Chia is the eldest of three children born to a businessman and a home-maker. He is married, and has a son.

== Awards ==
2010: Chia, together with Timbre's other co-founder Danny Loong, was conferred the Tourism Entrepreneur of the Year award under the Singapore Tourism Board's Singapore Experience Awards.

2014:

- Singapore Youth Award
- Junior Chamber International (JCI) Singapore, Ten Outstanding Young Persons of the World - Business, Economic and/or Entrepreneurial Accomplishment

2016: ASEAN Youth Award

== Notes ==
Parliament of Singapore
Preceded by Yu-Foo Yee Shoon; Lim Swee Say; Vivian Balakrishnan; Christopher de Souza; Liang Eng Hwa	Member of Parliament for Holland–Bukit Timah GRC; 2020 – present Served alongside: (2020 – 2025) Sim Ann, Vivian Balakrishnan, Christopher de Souza (2025 – present) Sim Ann, Vivian Balakrishnan, Christopher de Souza	Incumbent
