= Wijeysingha =

Wijeysingha is a surname found in Singapore. Notable people with the surname include:

- Eugene Wijeysingha (1934–2024), Singaporean teacher and historian
- Vincent Wijeysingha (born 1970), Singaporean academic and politician
