= Sim Ann =

Singaporean politician

The Honourable Sim Ann
- 沈颖

Second Minister for Foreign Affairs
- Incumbent
- Assumed office 27 July 2026
- Prime Minister: Lawrence Wong
- Minister: Vivian Balakrishnan
- Preceded by: Maliki Osman (2025)

Second Minister for Home Affairs
- Incumbent
- Assumed office 27 July 2026 Serving with Edwin Tong
- Prime Minister: Lawrence Wong
- Minister: K. Shanmugam
- Preceded by: Josephine Teo

Deputy Party Whip of the People's Action Party
- Incumbent
- Assumed office 6 June 2019 Serving with Zaqy Mohamad (2019–2020)
- Secretary-General: Lee Hsien Loong; Lawrence Wong
- Party Whip: Janil Puthucheary
- Preceded by: Sam Tan

Member of Parliament for Holland–Bukit Timah GRC
- Incumbent
- Assumed office 7 May 2011
- Preceded by: PAP held
- Majority: 2011: 16,367 (20.20%); 2015: 31,292 (33.2%); 2020: 35,118 (32.72%); 2025: 64,174 (58.50%)

Personal details
- Born: 12 March 1975 (age 51) Singapore
- Party: People's Action Party
- Spouse: Mok Ying Jang
- Children: 3
- Education: Exeter College, Oxford (MA); Stanford University (MA); Nanyang Technological University

Chinese name
- Traditional Chinese: 沈穎
- Simplified Chinese: 沈颖
Transcriptions
Standard Mandarin
- Hanyu Pinyin: Shěn Yǐng
- Wade–Giles: Shên³ Ying³
Southern Min
- Hokkien POJ: Sím Éng

Sim Ann (Note: Chinese: 沈颖; pinyin: Shěn Yǐng) (born 12 March 1975) is a Singaporean politician and former civil servant who has been serving as Second Minister for Home Affairs and Second Minister for Foreign Affairs since 2026. A member of the governing People's Action Party (PAP), she is a Member of Parliament (MP) for the Holland–Bukit Timah Group Representation Constituency (GRC) since 2011.

A recipient of the President's Scholarship, Sim started her career in the Civil Service and had worked in the Ministry of Health (MOH), Ministry of Trade and Industry (MTI) and Prime Minister's Office (PMO).

She made her political debut in the 2011 general election as part of a four-member PAP team contesting in Holland–Bukit Timah GRC, and won 60.1% of the vote.

== Education ==
Sim was educated at Raffles Girls' School and Hwa Chong Junior College. In 1994, Sim received the President's Scholar and studied at Exeter College, Oxford, at the University of Oxford and graduated in 1997 with a Bachelor of Arts (later promoted to Master of Arts by seniority) degree in philosophy, politics and economics (PPE).

She subsequently went on to earn a Master of Arts degree in political science from Stanford University in 1998. She also completed a postgraduate diploma in translation and interpretation at the Nanyang Technological University in 2005.

== Career ==
=== Civil Service career ===
Sim started her career in the Civil Service.

From 1998 to 2000, she was Assistant Director for Finance Policy and Planning at the Ministry of Health (MOH). From 2000 to 2003, she was Assistant Director for Implementation Planning at the Ministry of Home Affairs (MHA). From 2003 to 2006, she was Deputy Director for Trade at the Ministry of Trade and Industry (MTI).

From 2007 to 2009, Sim was seconded to the International Enterprise Singapore as its Regional Director based in Shanghai, where she headed a team assisting Singapore-based companies with investment and sales in East China.

From 2009 to 2011, she was Director of the National Population Secretariat and led efforts to restructure the secretariat into the National Population and Talent Division under the Prime Minister's Office (PMO).

=== Political career ===
Sim entered politics when she joined a four-member People's Action Party team to contest in Holland–Bukit Timah GRC during the 2011 general election. The PAP team won with 60.08% of the vote against the Singapore Democratic Party so Sim became a Member of Parliament representing the Bukit Timah ward of Holland–Bukit Timah GRC. On 21 May 2011, she was appointed Senior Parliamentary Secretary at the Ministry of Law and Ministry of Education. On 1 November 2012, she relinquished her appointment at the Ministry of Law and became Senior Parliamentary Secretary at the Ministry of Communications and Information while continuing to hold her appointment at the Ministry of Education. On 1 September 2013, she was promoted to Minister of State and continued serving at the Ministries of Education, and Communications and Information.

During the 2015 general election, Sim contested as part of a four-member PAP team in Holland–Bukit Timah GRC again and they won with 66.6% of the vote against the Singapore Democratic Party. Following the election, on 1 October 2015, Sim was promoted to Senior Minister of State and appointed to the Ministry of Finance and Ministry of Culture, Community and Youth. She was also appointed Deputy Government Whip. On 22 August 2016, she relinquished her appointment at the Ministry of Finance and switched to the Ministry of Trade and Industry while continuing to serve at the Ministry of Culture, Community and Youth. On 1 May 2018, she switched from the Ministry of Trade and Industry to the Ministry of Communications and Information, while continuing to serve at the Ministry of Culture, Community and Youth.

At the 2020 general election, Sim joined the four-member PAP team contesting in Holland–Bukit Timah GRC again and they won with 66.36% of the vote against the Singapore Democratic Party. On 27 July 2020, Sim was appointed Senior Minister of State at the Ministry of National Development and Ministry of Communications and Information. On 15 May 2021, she relinquished her appointment at the Ministry of Communications and Information and became Senior Minister of State at the Ministry of Foreign Affairs while concurrently serving as Senior Minister of State at the Ministry of National Development.

On 22 July 2026, Prime Minister Lawrence Wong announced that Sim would be promoted to full minister and appointed Second Minister for Foreign Affairs and Second Minister for Home Affairs. The appointments took effect on 27 July 2026.

== Personal life ==
Sim is married to Mok Ying Jang, a doctor who is the Deputy Chief Operating Officer of the National Healthcare Group Polyclinics. Mok was also a member of the first Singaporean team to climb Mount Everest in 1998. Sim and Mok have two sons and one daughter.

== Notes ==
Parliament of Singapore
Preceded by Yu-Foo Yee Shoon; Lim Swee Say; Vivian Balakrishnan; Liang Eng Hwa	Member of Parliament for Holland–Bukit Timah GRC; 2011 – present Served alongside: (2011 – 2015): Christopher de Souza, Vivian Balakrishnan, Liang Eng Hwa (2020 – 2025): Christopher de Souza, Vivian Balakrishnan, Edward Chia (2025 – present): Christopher de Souza, Vivian Balakrishnan, Edward Chia	Incumbent
