= Liang Eng Hwa =

Singaporean politician (born 1964)

The Honourable Liang Eng Hwa
- 连荣华
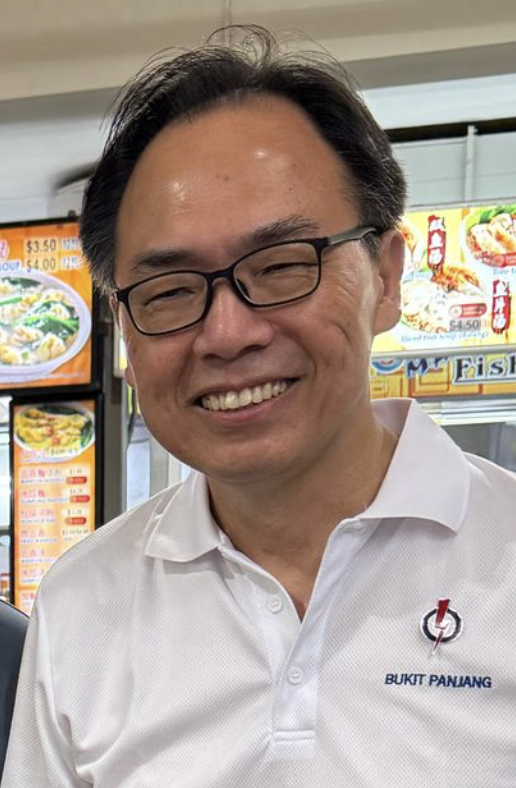
- Liang in 2025

Member of Parliament for Bukit Panjang SMC
- Incumbent
- Assumed office 10 July 2020
- Preceded by: Teo Ho Pin
- Majority: 2020: 2,509 (7.46%); 2025: 7,101 (22.76%)

Member of Parliament for Holland–Bukit Timah GRC
- In office 6 May 2006 – 23 June 2020
- Preceded by: Constituency established
- Succeeded by: PAP held
- Majority: 2006: N/A (walkover); 2011: 16,367 (20.16%); 2015: 31,292 (33.20%)

Personal details
- Born: 20 March 1964 (age 62) State of Singapore
- Party: People's Action Party
- Education: University of Melbourne (BCom)
- Occupation: Politician; banker

Liang Eng Hwa (Note: Chinese: 连荣华; pinyin: Lián Rónghuá) (born 20 March 1964) is a Singaporean politician and banker. A member of the People's Action Party (PAP), he has been the Member of Parliament (MP) for Bukit Panjang Single Member Constituency (SMC) since 2020. He had previously represented the Zhenghua division of Holland–Bukit Timah Group Representation Constituency (GRC) between 2006 and 2020.

== Education ==
Liang attended Bukit Panjang English School and Anderson Secondary School before graduating from Singapore Polytechnic in 1984 with a diploma in civil engineering.

He subsequently went on to complete a Bachelor of Commerce with first class honours degree at the University of Melbourne.

== Career ==
Liang was a managing director at DBS Bank and a board member of the Urban Redevelopment Authority from 2009 to 2018.

=== Political career ===
Liang made his political debut in 2006, when he joined a five-member PAP team contesting in Holland–Bukit Timah GRC during the general election that year; the team won in a walkover. He was then assigned to the Zhenghua division. During the 2011 general election, he stood for reelection as part of a four-member PAP team in Holland–Bukit Timah GRC; the PAP won with 60.08% of the vote against the Singapore Democratic Party (SDP). He was also appointed chairman of the Finance, Trade & Industry Government Parliamentary Committee (GPC) in the 14th Parliament.

Ahead of the 2020 general election, Teo Ho Pin, the incumbent MP for Bukit Panjang SMC, announced his retirement from politics. Liang was then announced as the replacement candidate for Teo. He won the election with 53.74% of the vote, a narrow margin of 2,509 votes, against Paul Tambyah from the SDP. In the 2025 general election, Liang and Tambyah rematched in the SMC; Liang ended up winning with a "comfortable margin" as described by The Straits Times, with an increased 61.41% of the vote to Tambyah's 38.59%. Liang has served as the Vice-Chairman of the Holland-Bukit Panjang Town Council (HBPTC) since 2025.

== Personal life ==
Liang is a Buddhist.

On 26 July 2023, it was revealed that Liang was diagnosed with early stage nose cancer.

== Notes ==
Parliament of Singapore
New constituency	Member of Parliament for Holland–Bukit Timah GRC; 2006 – 2020; Served alongside: (2006-2011): Yu-Foo Yee Shoon, Lim Swee Say, Vivian Balakrishnan, Christopher de Souza, (2011-2015): Sim Ann, Vivian Balakrishnan, Christopher de Souza (2015-2020): Sim Ann, Vivian Balakrishnan, Christopher de Souza	Succeeded by Sim Ann; Vivian Balakrishnan; Christopher de Souza; Edward Chia
Preceded by Teo Ho Pin	Member of Parliament for Bukit Panjang SMC; 2020 – present	Incumbent
