= Vivian Balakrishnan =

Singaporean politician (born 1961)

The Honourable Vivian Balakrishnan
- விவியன் பாலகிருஷ்ணன்
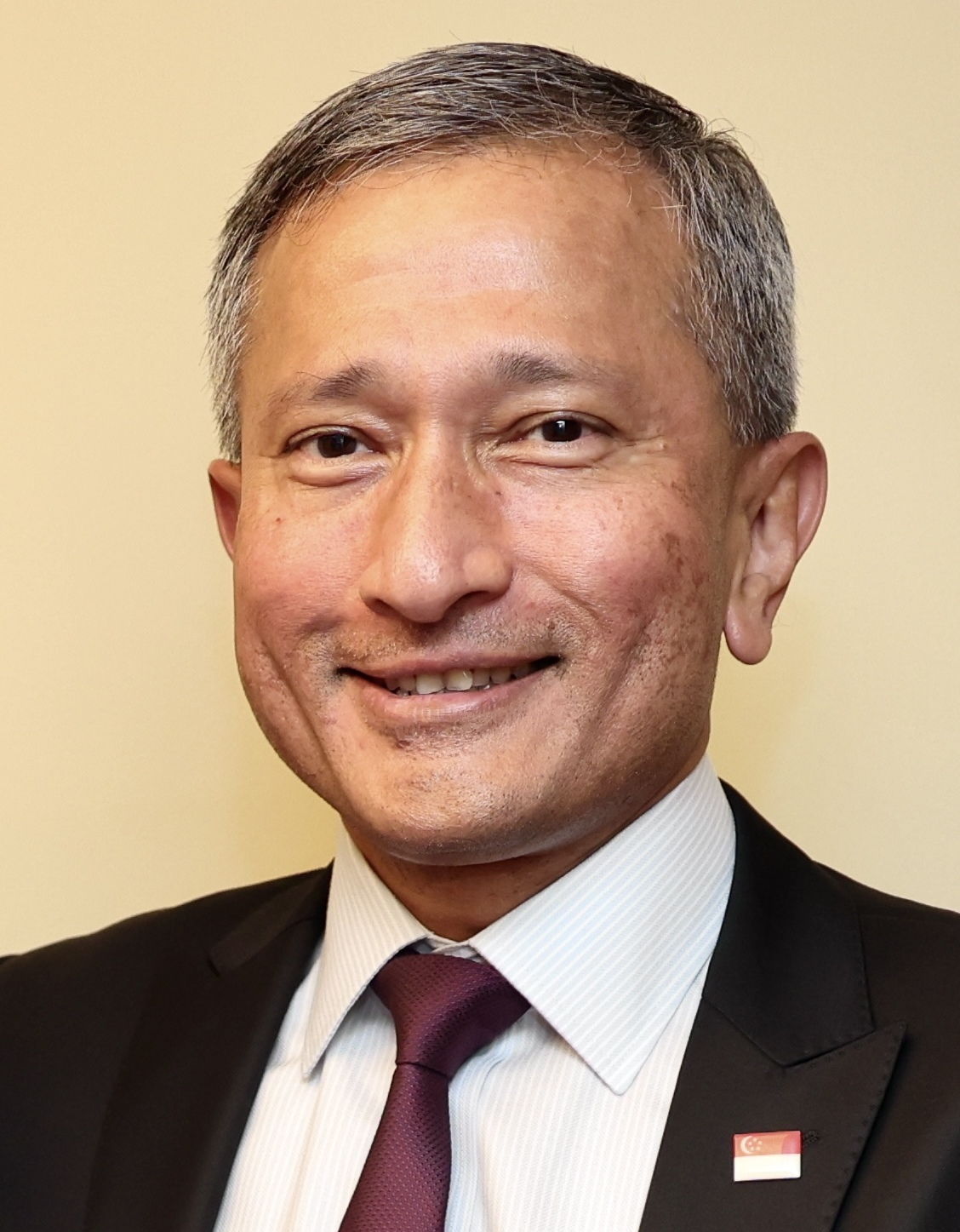
- Balakrishnan in 2023

Minister for Foreign Affairs
- Incumbent
- Assumed office 1 October 2015
- Prime Minister: Lee Hsien Loong; Lawrence Wong
- Second Minister: Josephine Teo (2017); Maliki Osman (2020–2025)
- Preceded by: K. Shanmugam

Acting Minister for Transport
- In office 25 February 2019 – 5 April 2019
- Prime Minister: Lee Hsien Loong
- Preceded by: Khaw Boon Wan
- Succeeded by: Khaw Boon Wan

Minister-in-charge of the Smart Nation Initiative
- In office 2014–2021
- Prime Minister: Lee Hsien Loong
- Preceded by: Position established
- Succeeded by: Josephine Teo

Minister for the Environment and Water Resources
- In office 21 May 2011 – 30 September 2015
- Prime Minister: Lee Hsien Loong
- Second Minister: Grace Fu (2012–2015)
- Preceded by: Yaacob Ibrahim
- Succeeded by: Masagos Zulkifli

Second Minister for Information, Communications and the Arts
- In office 30 May 2006 – 31 March 2008
- Prime Minister: Lee Hsien Loong
- Minister: Lee Boon Yang (2003–2009)

Second Minister for Trade and Industry
- In office 1 April 2005 – 29 May 2006
- Prime Minister: Lee Hsien Loong
- Minister: Lim Hng Kiang (2004–2018)

Minister for Community Development, Youth and Sports
- In office 12 August 2004 – 20 May 2011; Acting: 12 August 2004 – 31 March 2005
- Prime Minister: Lee Hsien Loong
- Preceded by: Yaacob Ibrahim
- Succeeded by: Chan Chun Sing

Member of Parliament for Holland-Bukit Timah GRC
- Incumbent
- Assumed office 27 April 2006
- Preceded by: Constituency established
- Majority: 2006: N/A (walkover); 2011: 16,367 (20.20%); 2015: 31,292 (33.2%); 2020: 35,118 (32.72%); 2025: 64,174 (58.50%)

Member of Parliament for Holland-Bukit Panjang GRC
- In office 4 November 2001 – 27 April 2006
- Preceded by: Constituency created
- Succeeded by: Constituency abolished
- Majority: N/A (walkover)

Personal details
- Born: 25 January 1961 (age 65) State of Singapore
- Party: People's Action Party
- Spouse: Joy Chia Oon Su
- Children: 4
- Education: National University of Singapore (MBBS)
- Occupation: Politician; diplomat; ophthalmologist

Vivian Balakrishnan (Note: Tamil: விவியன் பாலகிருஷ்ணன், romanized: Viviyaṉ Pālakiruṣṇaṉ) (born 25 January 1961) is a Singaporean politician, diplomat and former ophthalmologist who has been serving as Minister for Foreign Affairs since 2015. A member of the governing People's Action Party (PAP), he has been the Member of Parliament (MP) for the Cashew division of Holland–Bukit Timah GRC since 2006, and previously the Ulu Pandan division of Holland–Bukit Panjang GRC between 2001 and 2006.

He previously served as Second Minister for Trade and Industry between 2005 and 2006, Minister for Community, Youth and Sports between 2005 and 2011, Second Minister for Information, Communications and the Arts between 2006 and 2008, Minister for the Environment and Water Resources between 2011 and 2015, and Minister-in-charge of the Smart Nation Initiative between 2014 and 2017.

A President's Scholar, Balakrishnan studied medicine at the Yong Loo Lin School of Medicine at the National University of Singapore and underwent postgraduate specialist training in ophthalmology before he was admitted as a fellow of the Royal College of Surgeons of Edinburgh. From 1999 to 2002, he served as the commanding officer of the Second Combat Support Hospital of the Singapore Armed Forces (SAF), while holding the positions of medical director of the Singapore National Eye Centre and chief executive officer of the Singapore General Hospital concurrently.

Balakrishnan made his political debut in the 2001 general election as part of a five-member PAP team contesting in Holland–Bukit Panjang GRC and won by an uncontested walkover. He was subsequently appointed as Minister of State for National Development in 2002, and Senior Minister of State for Trade and Industry in 2004.

== Early life and education ==
Vivian Balakrishnan was born on 25 January 1961 in Singapore to G.D. Balakrishnan and Helen Ong Yong Sang. As a Chindian, his father was a Tamil from Tamil Nadu, India, and his mother was a Hoklo, with ancestry from Fuqing, Fujian, China.

He was educated at Anglo-Chinese School and National Junior College before he was conferred the President's Scholarship in 1980 to study medicine at the Yong Loo Lin School of Medicine at the National University of Singapore. He served two terms as the president of the NUS Student Union, and later the chairman of the union council.

Balakrishnan chose a postgraduate specialisation in ophthalmology and became a fellow of the Royal College of Surgeons of Edinburgh in 1991.

== Medical career ==
Balakrishnan had worked at Moorfields Eye Hospital in London between 1993 and 1995 as a specialist senior registrar, where he subspecialised in paediatric ophthalmology.

When Balakrishnan returned to Singapore, he became a consultant ophthalmologist at the Singapore National Eye Centre and National University Hospital, and an associate professor of ophthalmology at the National University of Singapore in 1998.

In 1999, he became the medical director of the Singapore National Eye Centre, and later the chief executive officer of the Singapore General Hospital in 2000. Balakrishnan was also the commanding officer of the 2nd Combat Support Hospital of the Singapore Armed Forces (SAF) between 1999 and 2002.

In the 1990s, he hosted the series Health Matters on Singapore television.

== Political career ==
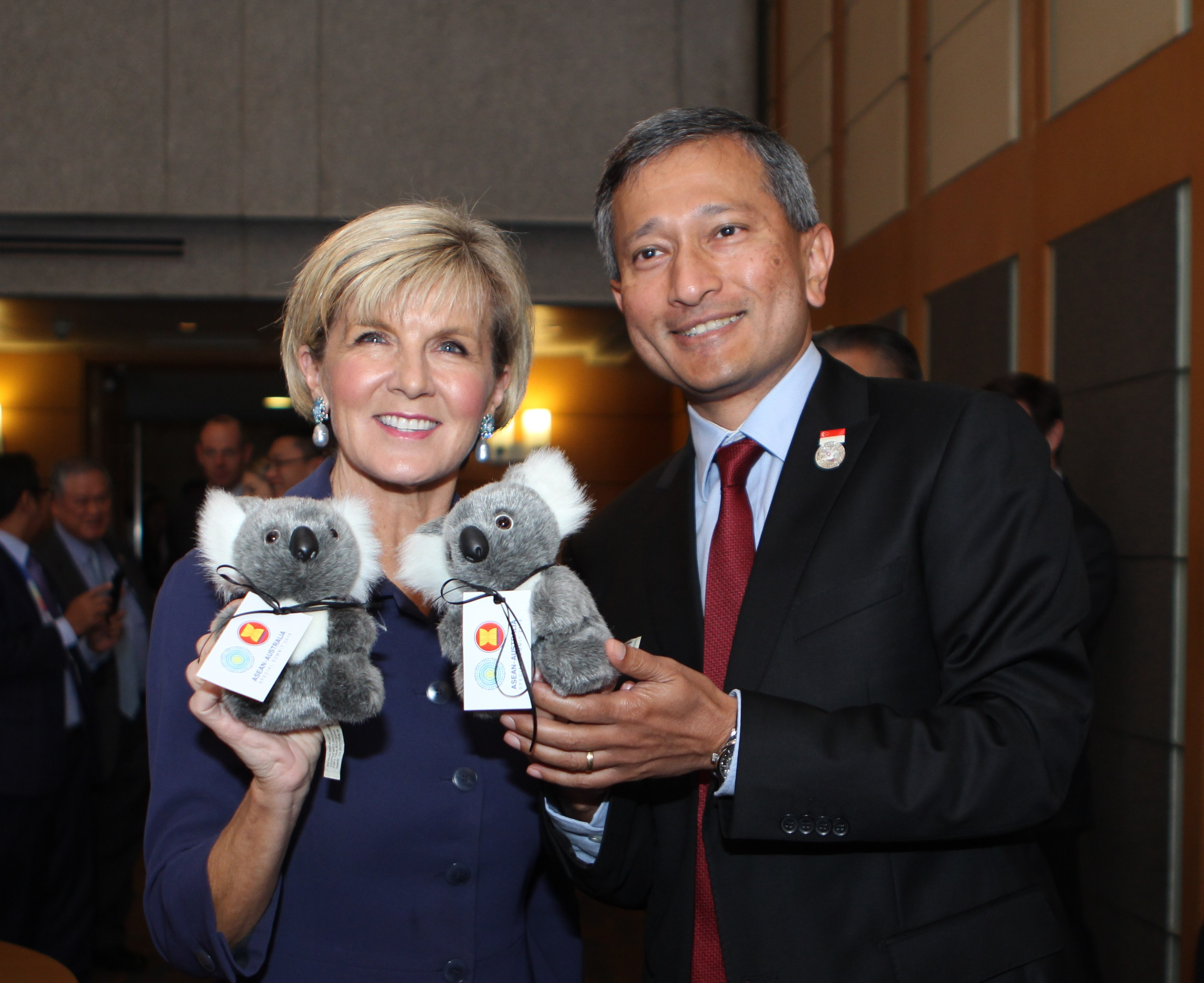
Balakrishnan with Australia's Minister for Foreign Affairs Julie Bishop in 2017

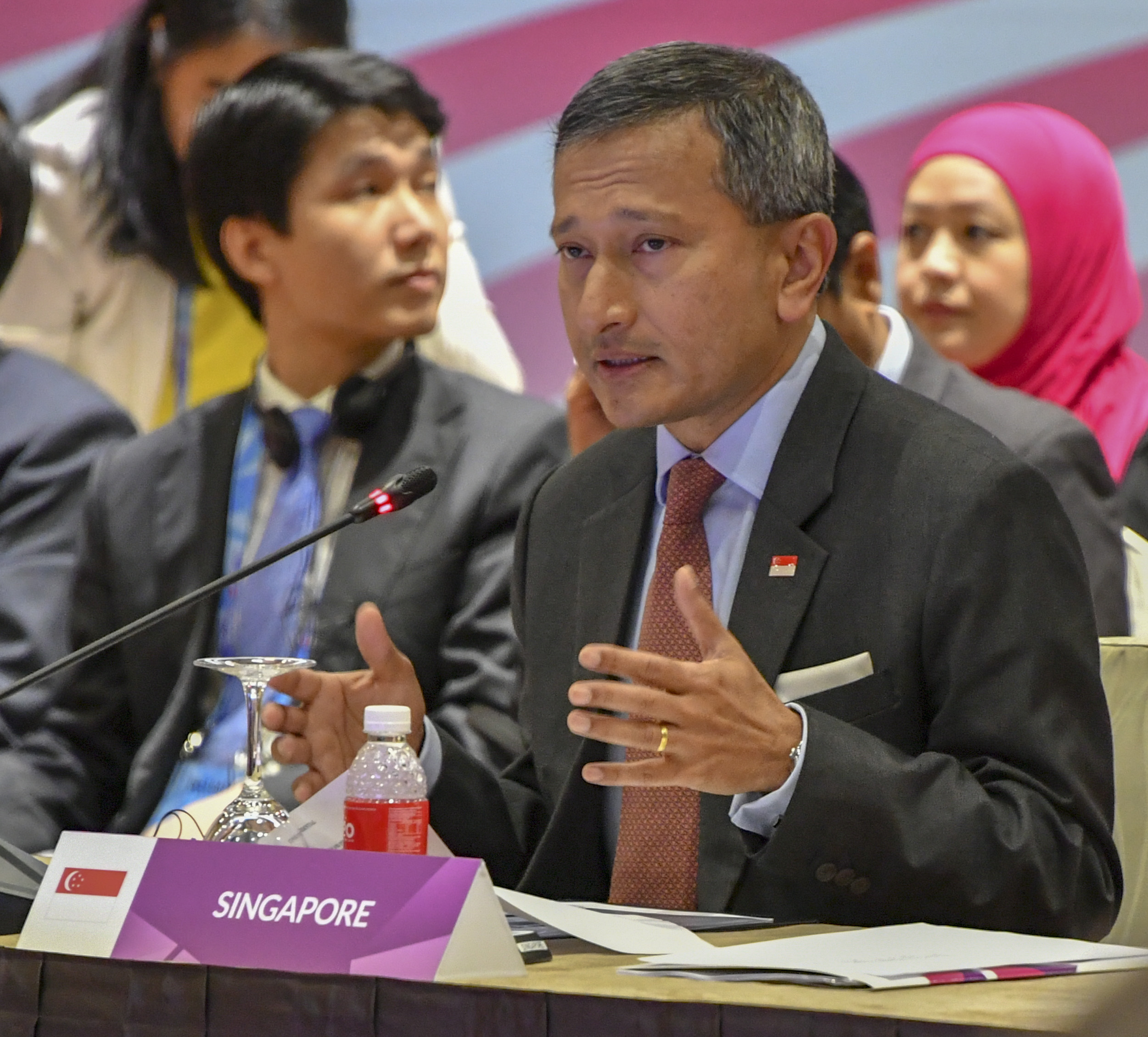
Balakrishnan speaking at the 2018 East Asia Summit

Balakrishnan made his political debut in the 2001 general election as part of the five-member PAP team contesting in Holland–Bukit Panjang GRC and won by an uncontested walkover. He was subsequently appointed Minister of State for National Development, and Chairman of the Remaking Singapore Committee in 2002. He was later appointed Senior Minister of State for Trade and Industry in 2004.

In 2004, Balakrishnan was appointed acting Minister for Community Development, Youth and Sports. He was made a full member of the Cabinet in 2005.

During the 2006 general election, Balakrishnan was part of a five-member PAP team led by Lim Swee Say, contesting in Holland–Bukit Timah GRC and won with a walkover.

During a Committee of Supply debate in Parliament on 9 March 2007 regarding the estimates of expenditure for the Ministry of Community Development, Youth and Sports (MCYS), an MP for Jalan Besar GRC, Lily Neo asked Balakrishnan whether the ministry would consider raising the Public Assistance rates for the purpose of ensuring recipients are able to have three meals a day, to which Balakrishnan replied with "How much do you want? Do you want three meals in a hawker centre, food court or restaurant?" In 2011, Balakrishnan raised the public assistance scheme from $260 in 2007 to $400 for a single-person household.

During the 2011 general election, Balakrishnan led a four-member PAP team which includes Liang Eng Hwa, Christopher de Souza and Sim Ann contesting in Holland–Bukit Timah GRC and won 60.1% of the vote. This was the first time Holland–Bukit Timah GRC were being contested since its formation in 2001.

During the political campaign for the 2011 general election, Balakrishnan said that the candidates from the Singapore Democratic Party (SDP) did not have any plans for the constituency, and their selection of Holland–Bukit Timah GRC was an opportunistic act. He suggested that they were trying to suppress a certain YouTube video featuring a member of their team and that it raised questions about their agenda and motivation. It was later discovered that the video included Vincent Wijeysingha at a forum discussing issues surrounding gay rights and section 377A of the Penal Code in Singapore. The PAP team issued a statement asking the SDP team whether they were pursuing a "gay agenda". The SDP denied it, saying that they were not pursuing a "gay agenda" and the issue was put to rest. The PAP drew criticism from internet users in Singapore for their election strategy.

At the same election, the SDP candidates raised the issue of government spending for the 2010 Summer Youth Olympics, which Balakrishnan had overseen as Minister for Community Development, Youth and Sports, saying that the budget exceeded the initial estimates of S$104 million by over three times. Balakrishnan acknowledged that they had got the initial estimates wrong as it was the first time that an event of that scale was organised in Singapore. He asserted that the increased budget did not affect other programmes of the ministry, and that 70% of the spending for the event went into paying local firms for their services. He declared that his team had spent less than the finalised budget amount and did not waste money.

On 21 May 2011, Balakrishnan was appointed Minister for the Environment and Water Resources, taking over from Yaacob Ibrahim. After the 2015 general election, Balakrishnan was appointed Minister for Foreign Affairs.

In response to a parliamentary question on 5 January 2021 regarding the use of data from the contact tracing app developed during the COVID-19 pandemic known as TraceTogether, the Minister of State for Home Affairs Desmond Tan replied that under the Criminal Procedure Code, the Police can access TraceTogether data for the purpose of criminal investigations, despite Balakrishnan's assurance to the public 8 months earlier in June 2020 that TraceTogether data will only be used for contact tracing purposes. Balakrishnan later said in Parliament "I take full responsibility for this mistake. And I deeply regret the consternation and anxiety caused".

In September 2021, during a debate in Parliament about the Comprehensive Economic Cooperation Agreement, a hot mic picked up Balakrishnan referring to Non-constituency Member of Parliament (NCMP) Leong Mun Wai of the Progress Singapore Party as "illiterate" and questioning how Leong got into Raffles Institution (RI) in a conversation with fellow PAP MPs on the front bench. Balakrishnan was subsequently called by Leong to apologise.

In 2023, Balakrishnan and K. Shanmugam were investigated by the Corrupt Practices Investigation Bureau (CPIB) for their rentals of state-owned bungalows at Ridout Road. The CPIB reported that they did not find any criminal wrongdoing or improper conduct.

On 12 March 2025, Minister for Law and Home Affairs, Shanmugam was confronted by two women from Monday of Palestine Solidarity group at his Meet-The-People session to address the Protection from Online Falsehoods and Manipulation Act. The confrontation was recorded on video and lasted seven minutes. On 13 March, Calvin Cheng, in a Facebook post, offered to send the activist group to Gaza, provided they do not return to Singapore and also told their Facebook followers to leave Singapore for Gaza. It was later discovered that Balakrishnan and Senior Minister of State for National Development and Digital Development and Information Tan Kiat How had liked the post by Cheng. Tan claimed that he had accidentally liked the post after Monday of Palestine Solidarity had questioned him about Cheng's post and had since “unliked” the Facebook post. Balakrishnan claimed he did not like the post and had since gotten Meta, the owner and operator of Facebook, to investigate unauthorised activity on his Facebook account. As of January 2026, no further statements have been made about this.

== Personal life ==
He is married to Joy Chia Oon Su. They have a daughter and three sons.

== Notes ==
Political offices
Preceded by Yaacob Ibrahim	Minister for Community Development, Youth and Sports; 2005 – 2011; Acting: 2004 – 2005	Succeeded by Chan Chun Sing as Acting Minister
Preceded by Yaacob Ibrahim	Minister for the Environment and Water Resources; 2011 – 2015	Succeeded by Masagos Zulkifli
New office	Minister-in-charge of the Smart Nation Initiative; 2014 – 2021	Succeeded by Josephine Teo
Preceded by K. Shanmugam	Minister for Foreign Affairs; 2015 – present	Incumbent
Parliament of Singapore
New constituency	Member of Parliament for Holland–Bukit Panjang GRC; 2001 – 2006; Served alongside: Lim Swee Say, David Lim Tik En, Gan Kim Yong, Teo Ho Pin	Constituency abolished
New constituency	Member of Parliament for Holland–Bukit Timah GRC; 2006 – present Served alongside: (2006 – 2011): Yu-Foo Yee Shoon, Lim Swee Say, Christopher de Souza, Liang Eng Hwa (2011 – 2015): Sim Ann, Christopher de Souza, Liang Eng Hwa (2020 – 2025): Sim Ann, Christopher de Souza, Edward Chia (2025 – present): Sim Ann, Christopher de Souza, Edward Chia	Incumbent
Party political offices
Preceded by Lim Swee Say	Chairman of Young PAP; 2004 – 2008	Succeeded by Teo Ser Luck
