= Socialist Front (Singapore, 2010) =

Opposition political party in Singapore

- Chinese name: 社会主义阵线; Shèhuì Zhǔyì Zhènxiàn
- Malay name: Barisan Sosialis باريسن سوسياليس
- Tamil name: சமூகவுடைமை முன்னணி Camūkavuṭaimai muṉṉaṇi
- Chairman: Ng Teck Siong
- Secretary-General: Chia Ti Lik
- Founder: Chia Ti Lik
- Founded: 2010
- Split from: Reform Party
- Ideology: Socialism
- Political position: Left-wing
- Colours: Red

The Socialist Front is a political party in Singapore. It was formed in 2010 by several former Reform Party members. The party has the objective of establishing a socialist state in Singapore should it be elected to government. The current Socialist Front had no affiliation with the similarly named Barisan Sosialis party which existed from 1961 to 1988.

== History ==
The Socialist Front was formed in 2010 by Chia Ti Lik, a lawyer who had contested in the 2006 Election as a Workers' Party candidate in East Coast Group Representation Constituency, and Ng Teck Siong, an opposition veteran who resigned from the Reform Party. Chia was chosen as the founding secretary-general, with Ng taking the position of founding chairman. During the party's press conference on 29 October 2010, the party unveiled its emblem: a five pointed red star which symbolizes democracy, equality, peace, progress and justice. The emblem espouses the objective of the party to achieve the above-mentioned goals through national unity.

The Socialist Front was set to contest its first General Election held on 7 May 2011. The Party's chairman Ng indicated that the party planned to contest several single member constituencies (SMCs) in the elections, although he declined to name the wards as the electoral boundaries were not known yet.

By the time the electoral boundaries were confirmed, the party had split over whether to contest or stay out. Ng indicated that it would contest some SMCs, in particular Mountbatten SMC. However, secretary-general Chia announced that the party would not take part in the election to avoid contesting against other opposition parties in three cornered fights.

Party treasurer Mansor resigned from the Socialist Front to join the Reform Party and contested in Ang Mo Kio GRC, but did not win. Soon after the elections, the Socialist Front became dormant.

== Ideology and objectives ==
The party's ideology was presented during the media conference on 29 October 2010. According to the Socialist Front's secretary-general Chia Ti Lik, the party has several objectives:

- To further the fundamental rights and liberties of Singaporeans;
- To contest the Parliamentary Elections and establish a socialist government for the benefit of Singaporeans;
- To encourage ownership and active participation of Singaporeans in the affairs and politics of the country;
- To make Singapore a home for all Singaporeans based on the Socialist model;
- To do all ancillary and related acts which espouse and promote the aforesaid objectives.

The party's objectives had been drawn from a socialist ideology, namely from the belief of setting economic and political policies for the good of the common people, the principle of "From each according to his ability, to each according to his needs", and lastly, equal opportunities to all citizens to allow them to maximize their fullest potential.

== Structure ==
The Socialist Front was governed by a Central Executive Committee (CEC) elected by the party's cadre members. The CEC comprised as below:

- Ng Teck Siong, Chairman
- Chia Ti Lik, Secretary-General
- Mansor Rahman, Treasurer
- Ng Pian Ying, Member
- Ng Soin Liang, member
- Lim Mie, Member

== See also ==
- Socialism
- Social Democracy
- Barisan Sosialis
- List of socialist parties
