= 2011 Singaporean general election =

- 7 May 2011

All 87 directly elected seats in Parliament (and up to 9 NCMPs)
- Registered: 2,350,873 (Note: 139,771 of the 2,350,873 registered voters were in uncontested constituencies, leaving 2,211,102 voters able to vote.)
- Turnout: 93.18% (▼0.82pp)
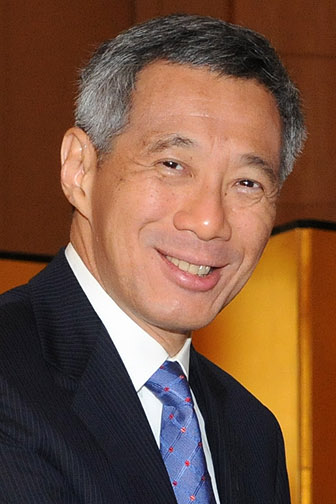

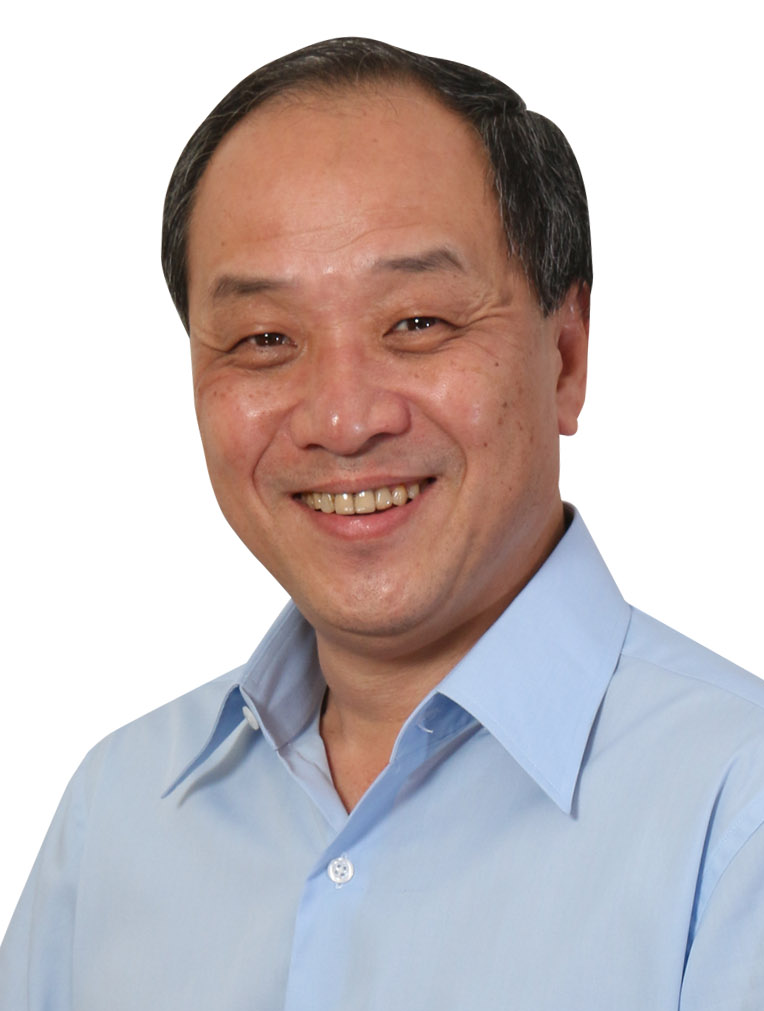

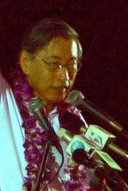
	First party	Second party	Third party
Leader	Lee Hsien Loong	Low Thia Khiang	Chiam See Tong
Party	PAP	WP	SPP
Leader's seat	Ang Mo Kio GRC	Hougang SMC (contested Aljunied GRC, won)	Potong Pasir SMC (contested Bishan–Toa Payoh GRC, lost)
Last election	66.60%, 82 seats	16.50%, 2 seats	12.96%, 1 seat
Seats won	81	8	1
Seat change	▼1	▲6	Steady
Popular vote	1,212,154	258,510	62,639
Percentage	60.14%	12.83%	3.11%
Swing	▼6.46pp	▼3.67pp	▼9.85pp
- Results by constituency
Prime Minister before election
Lee Hsien Loong
PAP
Prime Minister after election
Lee Hsien Loong
PAP

General elections were held in Singapore on 7 May 2011 to elect members of Parliament. They were the thirteenth general elections since the introduction of self-government in 1959 and the eleventh since independence in 1965. President S.R. Nathan dissolved parliament on 19 April on the advice of Prime Minister Lee Hsien Loong three weeks before the election. The number of elected seats was increased from 84 to 87 from the previous election. This was the second election contested by Lee as prime minister.

Key issues in the elections included immigration, the cost of living and housing, as well as ministerial salaries, opposition representation, the management of the 2010 Summer Youth Olympics, and the national security including the Mas Selamat Kastari's breakout in 2008. As a result, the election is described by analysts and pundits as a "watershed" election, whereas it saw the most number of seats being contested at the time, and the electorate surpassed two million, making it the most actively contested in Singapore's history at the time since its first post-independence election in 1968. The only constituency with a multi-cornered fight was Punggol East SMC, the first such multi-cornered contest since 2001, while the only constituency with a walkover was the five-seat Tanjong Pagar GRC; it was the last general election to have a walkover in at least one constituency until 2025. It also marked the last general election to feature Lee Kuan Yew prior to his death in 2015.

While the ruling People's Action Party (PAP) retained its supermajority, their popular vote fell further to a record-worst score in post-independence with only 60.14%. Nevertheless, the election saw historic gains for the opposition in Singapore's political landscape, with the Workers' Party (WP) clinching the first Group representation constituency since its creation in 1988, with the team defeating the incumbent PAP in the Aljunied GRC to expand their representation to eight seats, including Hougang SMC and the two non-constituency seats (NCMP). With amendments to the constitution on increasing the required minimum opposition candidates to nine, three NCMPs were awarded with one going to Singapore People's Party (SPP) after a narrow defeat in Potong Pasir, returning that SMC to PAP's hands for the first time since 1984; for the first time since 1988, only one opposition party (the WP) won elected MPs, as the SPP's Chiam See Tong, who led his team in Bishan–Toa Payoh GRC, was defeated while his wife, Lina Loh, lost in his safe seat of Potong Pasir SMC.

== Background ==
The 2011 general election was the thirteenth held since the introduction of self-government in 1959 and the eleventh since Singapore's independence in 1965. The governing People's Action Party (PAP) aimed to secure its thirteenth consecutive term in office since its first electoral victory in 1959. It was the second general election led by Lee Hsien Loong as both Prime Minister and Secretary-General of the PAP.

The returning officer is the Chief Executive Director of the People's Association (PA) Yam Ah Mee, who replaced his predecessor Tan Boon Huat after serving as returning officer for three general elections from 1997 to 2006.

=== Parliamentary reforms ===
On 11 March 2010, the Government tabled three bills in the parliament to amend the Constitution, the Presidential Elections Act and the Parliamentary Elections Act, all of which were later passed by its legislature on 26 April by a 74–1 vote following a three-hour debate on the bill.

These amendments include the reduced average size of Group representation constituencies (GRC) and the increase of the minimum opposition legislators and Nominated Members of Parliament (NMP), from three and six respectively to nine each. As such, this was the first election to increase the Non-Constituency Members of Parliament (NCMPs) since the implementation of the scheme in 1984. Another new addition was "cooling-off" day, a one-day period of election silence held on the eve of polling day, which prohibit regular campaigning with some exceptions such as the party political broadcasts. Internet campaigning was also formally legalised as a legitimate method of political campaigning.

A month before the dissolution, the Elections Department Singapore announced a raise of the maximum campaigning expenses in this election, which raised from the previous amount per each voter of $3 up to $3.50.

=== Political parties ===
The governing People's Action Party (PAP) has been in power since Singapore's independence in 1965, and is currently led by the Prime Minister Lee Hsien Loong, marking its second election under Lee's premiership.

The last parliament besides PAP, comprises two other opposition parties, namely Workers' Party (WP) and Singapore Democratic Alliance (SDA). The WP, led by Low Thia Khiang since 2001, become the main opposition party per the results of the 2006 election, as well as its first NCMP Sylvia Lim, who was also the party's chairwoman. The SDA was left with Singapore Justice Party (SJP) and Pertubuhan Kebangsaan Melayu Singapura (Singapore Malay National Organization/PKMS) as its membership parties after two parties, Chiam See Tong's Singapore People's Party (SPP) and the National Solidarity Party (NSP), both left SDA, and Desmond Lim took over Chiam as its secretary-general. Former WP candidate Goh Meng Seng joined NSP in 2008, a year after NSP's departure, and become NSP's secretary-general.

The Singapore Democratic Party (SDP) is the only existing party without representation; however, secretary-general Chee Soon Juan was still unable to contest because of the undischarged bankruptcy at the time. (Note: Per the constitution, candidates with an undischarged bankrupty is barred from standing in elections. The SDP was thus led by its assistant secretary-general, John Tan, contesting in Sembawang GRC.) Debuting in this election is Reform Party, which was created on 18 June 2008 by former WP secretary-general J.B. Jeyaretnam, who had since cleared of bankruptcy and was reinstated into the law bar. J.B. died three months later on 30 September, and his son Kenneth has since become its secretary-general.

Party	Leader	Votes in GE2006	Seats won	Remarks
People's Action Party	Lee Hsien Loong	66.60%	82 / 84	80 seats at time of dissolution.
Workers' Party	Low Thia Khiang	16.34%	1 / 84	Including one Non-constituency Member of Parliament.
Singapore Democratic Alliance	Desmond Lim	12.96%	1 / 84	Alliance with Singapore Justice Party and Singapore Malay National Organisation parties.
National Solidarity Party	Goh Meng Seng	12.96%	1 / 84	Withdrew from the alliance in 2007.
Singapore People's Party	Chiam See Tong	12.96%	1 / 84	Withdrew from the alliance in 2010.
Singapore Democratic Party	John Tan	4.83%	0 / 84	Chee did not stand for the election.
Reform Party	Kenneth Jeyaretnam	Did not exist		

Other political parties not listed above were also created in-between two elections, namely United Singapore Democrats and Socialist Front; however, neither parties have fielded any candidates.

=== Electoral divisions ===
	2006	2011
Seats	89	93
Electoral divisions	23	27
Group representation constituencies	14	15
Four-Member GRCs	0	2
Five-Member GRCs	9	11
Six-Member GRCs	5	2
Single member constituencies	9	12
Average GRC size	5.36	5.00
Voters	2,158,704	2,347,198
Voters (overseas votes inclusive)	2,159,721	2,350,873
Average electorate per seat	25,711	27,673

The Electoral Boundaries Review Committee normally publishes an updated list of electoral divisions just before elections are called. Prior to the latest amendments, there were 14 GRCs, each with five or six seats, and nine Single Member Constituencies (SMC). There were a total of 84 seats being contested in the 2006 elections.

The new electoral map for 2011 was announced on 24 February 2011. The number of MPs to return has increased by three seats to 87, and four-member GRCs reappeared from the political map for the first time since its last appearance in 1997. Both Hong Kah and Jalan Besar GRCs were renamed into Chua Chu Kang and Moulmein–Kallang GRCs respectively, while three of five existing six-member GRCs were reduced to five seats each with Ang Mo Kio and Pasir Ris–Punggol remained at six (these GRCs would eventually be reduced in 2020). With the population growth in Yishun and Simpang leading to the formation of Nee Soon GRC, there are a total of 15 GRCs this election, up by one from the last election. Only two constituencies of Bishan–Toa Payoh and Tampines were left untouched.

The number of SMCs have been increased by three to 12 for this election, with the introductions of Hong Kah North, Pioneer, Punggol East and Sengkang West, as well as returning SMCs of Mountbatten, Radin Mas, Whampoa and Yuhua after being part of GRCs in previous elections. In turn, Chua Chu Kang, MacPherson, Nee Soon Central, Nee Soon East and Yio Chu Kang were absorbed into neighbouring GRCs.

Singapore electoral boundaries, released in February 2011

The changes made in the electoral divisions are as follows:

Constituency	Changes
Aljunied GRC	Absorbed portions of Kaki Bukit division from Marine Parade GRC, and a minor portion of Hougang SMC; Carved out portions of Aljunied–Hougang division to Ang Mo Kio GRC, and a minor portion of Aljunied–Hougang and Bedok Reservoir-Punggol divisions to Pasir Ris–Punggol GRC
Ang Mo Kio GRC	Absorbed Aljunied–Hougang division (renamed to Ang Mo Kio-Hougang) from Aljunied GRC and Yio Chu Kang SMC; Absorbed a minor portion of Punggol South from Pasir Ris–Punggol GRC; Carved out Nee Soon South division (excluding the Lentor area south of Seletar Expressway) into Nee Soon GRC, and Sengkang West division into SMC
Chua Chu Kang GRC	New Constituency; Formed from a majority of Hong Kah GRC (except for Hong Kah North division, which carved into SMC), and Chua Chu Kang SMC
East Coast GRC	Carved a portion of Kampong-Chai Chee to Marine Parade GRC
Holland–Bukit Timah GRC	Ward downsized to four members Carved out Buona Vista division into Tanjong Pagar GRC, a minor portion of Bukit Timah to West Coast GRC, and portions of Toh Guan to Jurong GRC
Jurong GRC	Carved out Yuhua division into SMC; Portions of Jurong Central and Taman Jurong divisions, West Coast GRC and Hong Kah GRC were formed into Jurong Spring division
Marine Parade GRC	Ward downsized to five members Absorbed MacPherson SMC and a minor portion of Joo Chiat SMC; Portions of Kaki Bukit and the entire Kampong Ubi-Kembangan divisions, and Kampong Chai Chee division from East Coast GRC were formed into Kembangan-Chai Chee division Carved out a portion of Kaki Bukit division to Aljunied GRC, and Mountbatten division into SMC
Moulmein–Kallang GRC	New Constituency; Formed from Jalan Besar GRC (except for Kreta Ayer–Kim Seng division (excluding northern Hong Lim portions) which was absorbed into Tanjong Pagar GRC, and Whampoa division as a SMC), and Moulmein division from Tanjong Pagar GRC
Nee Soon GRC	New Constituency; Formed from Nee Soon Central SMC, Nee Soon East SMC, Nee Soon South divisions from Ang Mo Kio GRC (excluding the Lentor area south of Seletar Expressway), and Canberra and Chong Pang divisions from Sembawang GRC
Pasir Ris–Punggol GRC	Carved out Punggol East division into SMC, and a minor portion of Punggol South division to Ang Mo Kio GRC; Portions of Punggol Central and North divisions were formed into Punggol West division
Sembawang GRC	Ward downsized to five members Carved out Canberra and Chong Pang to Nee Soon GRC; Portions of Sembawang and Woodlands were formed into Woodgrove division.
Tanjong Pagar GRC	Ward downsized to five members Absorbed Buona Vista and Kreta Ayer–Kim Seng divisions from Holland–Bukit Timah GRC and Jalan Besar GRC, respectively Carved out Moulmein division into Moulmein–Kallang GRC, and Radin Mas division into SMC; Merged Tanjong Pagar and Tiong Bahru divisions to form Tanjong Pagar–Tiong Bahru division
West Coast GRC	Carved out portions of Pioneer division into SMC, while Jurong Industrial, Jurong Island, Gul Circle, Tuas and Joo Koon were transferred to Ayer Rajah division Ayer Rajah–West Coast division were split into Ayer Rajah and West Coast divisions.

== Nomination ==
=== Timeline ===
Date	Event
24 February	Publication of Electoral Boundaries report
3 March	Certification of Registers of Electors
19 April	Dissolution of 11th Parliament; Writ of Election issued
22 April	Deadline of Submission of Political Donation Certificates
27 April	Nomination Day/First Live Political Party Broadcast
27 April – 5 May	Campaigning Period
6 May	Cooling-off Day/Second Live Political Party Broadcast
7 May	Polling Day
11 May	Overseas Votes Counting
16 May	Candidates revealed for Non-Constituency Member of Parliament
21 May	12th Parliament assembled
10 October	Opening of 12th Parliament

=== New candidates ===
A total of 78 candidates were brand-new to this election. Notable candidates out of the 24 introduced from the PAP that were part of the "fourth-generation" (4G) cabinet which include the eventual fourth Prime Minister of Singapore Lawrence Wong, a future Deputy Prime Minister of Singapore Heng Swee Keat, an ex-SAF Chief and ministers Chan Chun Sing, Tan Chuan-Jin, lawyer Edwin Tong, civil servants Low Yen Ling and Sim Ann, as well as Desmond Lee and Ong Ye Kung, the sons of former MPs Lee Yock Suan and Ong Lian Ten respectively.

There were 54 debuting candidates from six opposition parties, which include Pritam Singh who made another inroad into Parliament and went on to become the WP leader in 2018, as well as Lina Loh (wife of then-Potong Pasir SMC MP Chiam See Tong), Kenneth Andrew Jeyaretnam (son of the late J. B. Jeyaretnam), Nicole Seah, Tan Jee Say, Hazel Poa (who also joined by her spouse Tony Tan Lay Thiam) and Benjamin Pwee Yek Guan.

=== Retiring politicians ===
20 existing PAP members from the 11th Parliament retired this election, including speaker Abdullah Tarmugi, Senior Minister S Jayakumar, Lim Boon Heng, Lee Boon Yang and Yu-Foo Yee Shoon among others; two members died during their term (Ang Mo Kio GRC's Balaji Sadasivan and Jurong GRC's Ong Chit Chung) but neither by-elections were called since their wards were in the purview in Group Representation Constituency.

Eric Low, another PAP candidate that first entered politics in the 2001 election but lost twice to WP in Hougang SMC, did not seek re-election, making him the second PAP candidate to participate but did not enter parliament (the first being Pang Kim Hin).

=== Nomination day details ===
Nomination day occurred on 27 April 2011 and opened from 11am for an hour. The election deposit for this election was S$16,000, the highest amount set in any election's history. The Elections Department allocated the following nine places of nomination as nomination centres:

Nomination centre	Electoral division(s)
Admiralty Secondary School	Nee Soon GRC^{IO} Sembawang GRC^{M}
Bedok View Secondary School	East Coast GRC^{M} Pasir Ris-Punggol GRC^{M} Punggol East SMC
Deyi Secondary School	Aljunied GRC^{M} Ang Mo Kio GRC^{IO} Bishan-Toa Payoh GRC^{IO} Sengkang West SMC
Dunman Secondary School	Hougang SMC; Tampines GRC^{M}
Greenridge Secondary School	Bukit Panjang SMC; Holland-Bukit Timah GRC^{IO}
Jurong Junior College	Jurong GRC^{IO} Pioneer SMC; West Coast GRC^{IO} Yuhua SMC
Singapore Chinese Girls' School	Moulmein-Kallang GRC^{M} Radin Mas SMC; Tanjong Pagar GRC^{IO} Whampoa SMC
South View Primary School	Chua Chu Kang GRC^{M} Hong Kah North SMC
Tao Nan School	Joo Chiat SMC; Marine Parade GRC^{M} Mountbatten SMC; Potong Pasir SMC

- A ^{M} indicates a GRC requires a Malay/Muslim minority candidate, while ^{IO} indicates a GRC requires an Indian or other minority candidate

During nomination, Steve Tan Peng Hoe pulled out from contesting Tampines GRC; Tanjong Pagar GRC incumbent Baey Yam Keng took his place, in turn new candidate Chia Shi-Lu replaced Baey in his place.

=== Staking claims ===
Soon after the announcement of the new electoral boundaries, various opposition parties indicated their intent to contest, subject to negotiations between political parties to avoid three-cornered fights. The parties declaring an interest to contest each constituency and their nomination status is reflected below.

Nominations by various opposition parties as on nomination day on 27 April 2011. Banded shading indicates constituencies with three-party contests. There was no contest in Tanjong Pagar after the opposition team intending to submit a nomination were disqualified.

== General election campaign ==
=== Televised forums ===
In the first pre-election forum of this nature in Singapore since the 1988 General Election, Channel NewsAsia invited the main parties to record an hour-long programme. The programme, in English entitled, "A political forum on Singapore's future" brought together the ruling PAP and four opposition parties to discuss long and short-term challenges for the country. The forum included:

- Singapore Democratic Party, represented by its Assistant Treasurer Dr Vincent Wijeysingha;
- Singapore People's Party, represented by 2nd Vice Chairwoman Lina Chiam;
- Workers' Party, represented by Assistant Webmaster Gerald Giam;
- Singapore Democratic Alliance, represented by Assistant Secretary-General Mohamed Nazem Suki;
- People's Action Party, represented by:
  - Finance Minister and Jurong GRC MP Tharman Shanmugaratnam
  - Bishan–Toa Payoh GRC MP Josephine Teo

=== Social media ===
The Worker's Party utilised social media to circumvent obstacles placed in front of them by Singapore's government-controlled media.

=== Battleground Constituencies ===
Similar to the previous elections, many media outlets named the following constituencies as "hotspots":

- Aljunied GRC, in which it was PAP's narrowest victory (of 56.09%-43.91%) in the last election, as Hougang SMC incumbent Low Thia Khiang left the ward to lead his WP's A-team to contest the ward; analysts hinted that the addition of Kaki Bukit division into the ward (in exchange of Aljunied-Hougang division to Ang Mo Kio GRC) could be decisive, as many of the wards consist of parts of the previously defunct Cheng San and Eunos GRCs, both of which WP had strong support in during the constituency's existence.
- Similarly, Bishan–Toa Payoh GRC, which faced its first contest since the formation in 1997, was also a hotspot as Potong Pasir SMC incumbent Chiam See Tong left the ward to also lead his SPP's A-team (and the only GRC team) to contest the ward. Unlike Aljunied, the boundaries for Bishan–Toa Payoh were intact throughout its existence.
- Chua Chu Kang, Marine Parade and Tampines GRCs, in which the NSP party (the largest opposition slate for the election) fielded their top teams for them. Chua Chu Kang, previously a SMC in the last election where Steve Chia won 39.63% (the best performing losing score for SDA) was led by Sebastian Teo; Marine Parade, whose last contest was 19 years ago in 1992 was led by former MP Cheo Chai Chen; and Tampines, which NSP had contested in every election except 1997, was led by its party leader Goh Meng Seng (who was part of the Aljunied GRC WP team in the last election; he left WP in 2008 before joining NSP).
- Nee Soon GRC, a new constituency formed with the inclusions of Nee Soon Central and Nee Soon East SMCs, where many oppositions such as WP also had contested in the past two elections. The two incumbents, Ho Peng Kee and Ong Ah Heng, both retired in this election.
- Joo Chiat SMC was also named as one of the hotspots after incumbent MP Chan Soo Sen stepped down; Pasir Ris-Punggol GRC MP Charles Chong stepped in and faced WP's new face Yee Jenn Jong this election. Joo Chiat had the widest swing of 18.54% in the last election, when Chan defeated former WP chairman Tan Bin Seng with 65.01%-34.99%. According to Yee in his acceptance speech, he was a resident in this constituency.
- Punggol East SMC, in which it was the election's only three-cornered contest (between PAP's incumbent Michael Palmer, SDA's leader Desmond Lim, and WP's Lee Li Lian).
- Likewise, Holland–Bukit Timah GRC was also hotly contested as it was also the ward's inaugural battle since its formation last election.

=== Political rallies ===
The Singapore Police Force announced 41 political rally sites on 27 April which could be booked by political parties on a first-come-first-served basis. Rallies were allowed to be conducted from 28 April to 5 May, from 7am to 10pm. The 41st site is for lunch time rallies at Boat Quay near to the UOB Plaza.

National Solidarity Party

Date	Location	Constituency
28 April	Open field at Geylang East Central	Marine Parade GRC
29 April	Delta Hockey Pitch	Radin Mas SMC
30 April	Open field near Jalan Tenteram	Whampoa SMC
1 May	Jurong West Stadium	Pioneer SMC
2 May	Open field near Mountbatten Community Centre	Mountbatten SMC
3 May	Choa Chu Kang Stadium	Choa Chu Kang GRC
4 May	Tampines Stadium	Tampines GRC
5 May	Open field near Chinese Garden	Jurong GRC

People's Action Party

Date	Location	Constituency
28 April	Open field near Buangkok MRT station	Pasir Ris–Punggol GRC
29 April	Yio Chu Kang Stadium	Ang Mo Kio GRC
29 April	Open field near Kallang Avenue	Moulmein–Kallang GRC
29 April	Jurong West Stadium	Pioneer SMC
30 April	Serangoon Stadium	Aljunied GRC
30 April	Open field at Geylang East Central	Marine Parade GRC
30 April	Choa Chu Kang Stadium	Choa Chu Kang GRC
30 April	Open field near Hougang MRT station	Hougang SMC
1 May	Bedok Stadium	East Coast GRC
2 May	Open field near Segar Road	Bukit Panjang SMC
2 May	Jurong East Stadium	Yuhua SMC
2 May	Open field near Jurong West Avenue 3	Hong Kah North SMC
3 May	Boat Quay next to UOB Plaza (lunch time)	Ang Mo Kio GRC
3 May	Woodlands Stadium	Sembawang GRC
4 May	Open field near Mountbatten Community Centre	Mountbatten SMC
4 May	Open field in Sengkang East	Punggol East SMC
4 May	Yishun Stadium	Nee Soon GRC
4 May	Open field near Clementi Avenue 4	Holland–Bukit Timah GRC
4 May	Delta Hockey Pitch	Radin Mas SMC
5 May	Open field near Ubi Road 3	Aljunied GRC
5 May	Toa Payoh Stadium	Bishan–Toa Payoh GRC
5 May	Tampines Stadium	Tampines GRC
5 May	Open field near Potong Pasir Avenue 1	Potong Pasir SMC
5 May	Open field near Jalan Tenteram	Whampoa SMC
5 May	Open field near Segar Road	Bukit Panjang SMC
5 May	Bedok Stadium	East Coast GRC
5 May	Open field near Pasir Ris Park	Pasir Ris–Punggol GRC

Reform Party

Date	Location	Constituency
28 April	Clementi Stadium	West Coast GRC
30 April	Clementi Stadium	West Coast GRC
1 May	Yio Chu Kang Stadium	Ang Mo Kio GRC
2 May	Open field near West Coast Park	West Coast GRC
4 May	Clementi Stadium	West Coast GRC
5 May	Clementi Stadium	West Coast GRC
5 May	Yio Chu Kang Stadium (subsequently cancelled)	Ang Mo Kio GRC

Singapore Democratic Alliance

Date	Location	Constituency
29 April	Open field in Sengkang East	Punggol East SMC
1 May	Open field near Pasir Ris Park	Pasir Ris–Punggol GRC
4 May	Open field near Buangkok MRT station	Pasir Ris–Punggol GRC

Singapore Democratic Party

Date	Location	Constituency
28 April	Open field near Commonwealth Avenue	Holland–Bukit Timah GRC
29 April	Jurong East Stadium	Yuhua SMC
30 April	Woodlands Stadium	Sembawang GRC
1 May	Open field near Clementi Avenue 4	Holland–Bukit Timah GRC
2 May	Open field near Commonwealth Avenue	Holland–Bukit Timah GRC
3 May	Open field near Segar Road	Bukit Panjang SMC
4 May	Woodlands Stadium	Sembawang GRC
5 May	Boat Quay next to UOB Plaza (lunch time)	Holland–Bukit Timah GRC
5 May	Woodlands Stadium	Sembawang GRC

Singapore People's Party

Date	Location	Constituency
29 April	Open field near Jurong West Avenue 3	Hong Kah North SMC
30 April	Open field near Potong Pasir Avenue 1	Potong Pasir SMC
2 May	Bishan Stadium	Bishan–Toa Payoh GRC
4 May	Open field near Potong Pasir Avenue 1	Potong Pasir SMC
5 May	Bishan Stadium	Bishan–Toa Payoh GRC

Workers’ Party

Date	Location	Constituency
28 April	Open field near Hougang MRT station	Hougang SMC
29 April	Serangoon Stadium	Aljunied GRC
30 April	Bedok Stadium	East Coast GRC
1 May	Yishun Stadium	Nee Soon GRC
2 May	Open field near Kallang Avenue	Moulmein–Kallang GRC
3 May	Open field in Sengkang East	Punggol East SMC
4 May	Open field near Ubi Road 3	Aljunied GRC
5 May	Serangoon Stadium	Aljunied GRC

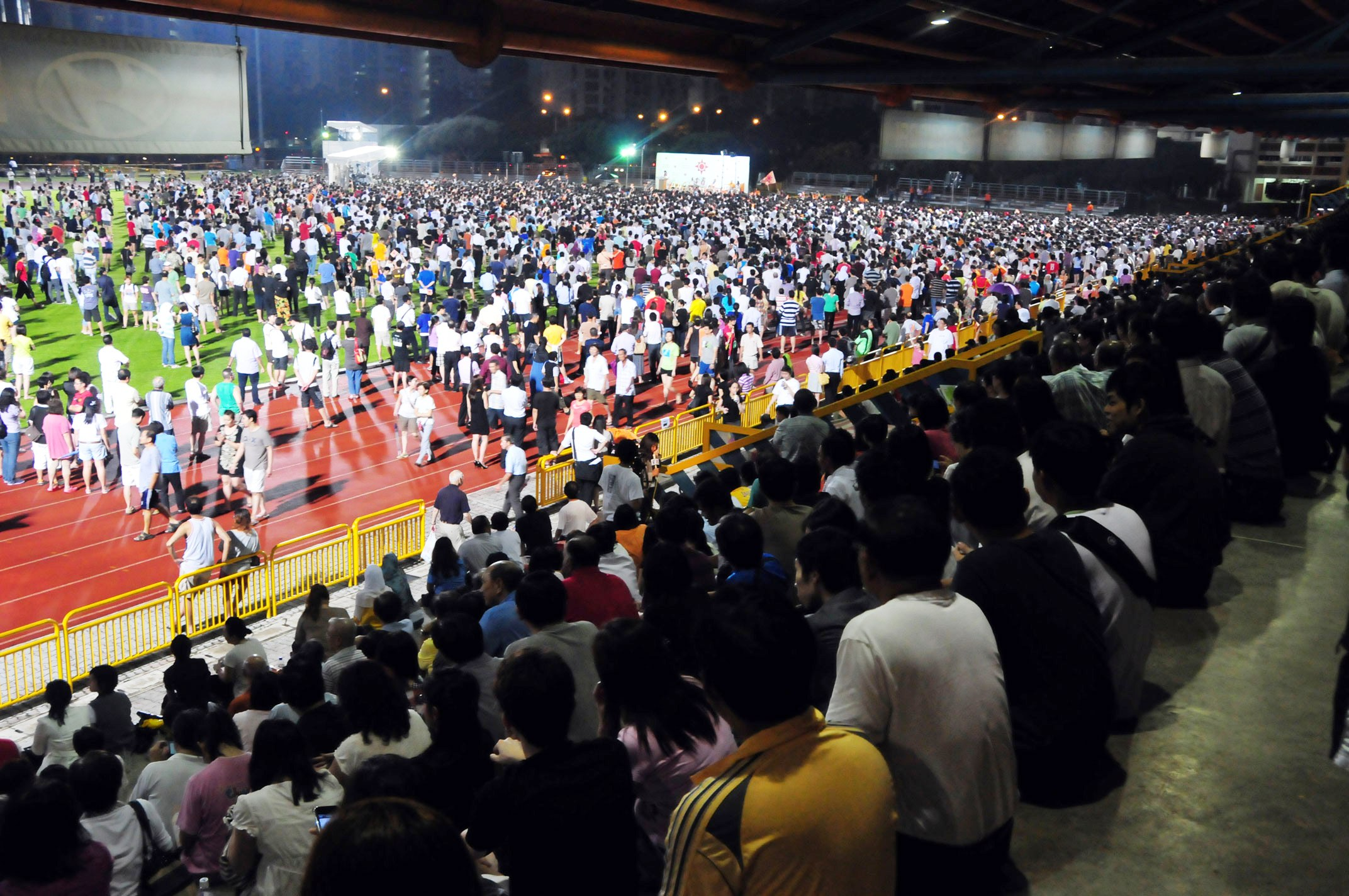
The National Solidarity Party's rally on 4 May at the Tampines Stadium

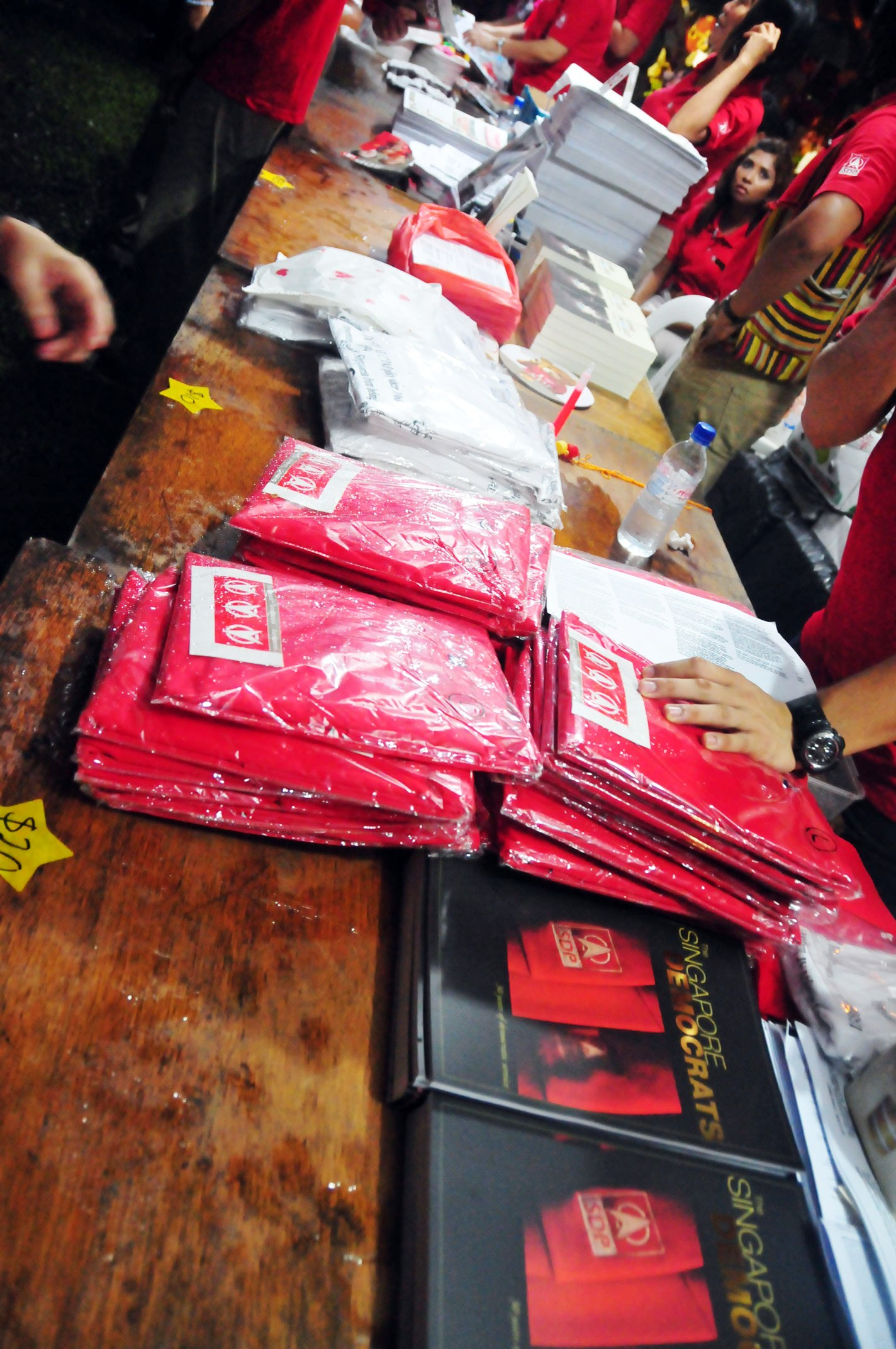
Merchandise sold during the political rally by the Singapore Democratic Party in Bukit Panjang on 3 May

== Controversies ==
=== Online video ===
During the 2011 elections campaigning, Vivian Balakrishnan said the SDP was "suppressing a certain YouTube video, which raises some very awkward questions about the agenda and motivations of the SDP and its candidates". He issued the following statement:

I am not sure what [the SDP] strategy is...I can't help feeling that part of the reason for their reticence is they have elements of their agenda they are not prepared to disclose and subject to scrutiny. Eventually, they will have to come out of the closet. (The Straits Times, 20 April 2011)

Vincent Wijeysingha rejected his comments stating, "We've been a very open party and we're very clear."

This incident was cited in an article published in The Economist criticising the ruling party's election strategy The New Paper released a story next day, with the headline: "Is Singapore ready for a GAY MP?". Kenneth Jeyaretnam of the Reform Party called Balakrishnan's campaign a "low attack."

Balakrishnan received widespread controversy and criticism online for his remark,. On 28 April, he told the press: "there is "no need" to further discuss [the] video". He said that his question was a "legitimate".

=== Cooling-off day ===
Nicole Seah, a team member contesting Marine Parade GRC under the NSP team, filed a complaint to the Elections Department on 6 May stating PAP-team member Tin Pei Ling had violated the state-mandated cooling-off period 24 hours before polls by posting a Facebook comment "in response to a video [in the state press] that showed Seah crying after being told about a MacPherson female resident who could not get a refund of her son's $80 tuition fees".

The NSP team was advised by the Elections Department to lodge a police report before the Elections Department could investigate.

The day after the election, Seah told reporters that her party had not received any response after making the complaint, and said no decision had been taken on whether or not to pursue the issue. She added that the NSP knew "it is an uphill battle to get any results out of this. I would rather devote my time and resources to the residents".

A similar complaint was lodged against Seah alleging that material had been published on her Facebook page during Cooling-Off Day. On 10 August, the Singapore Police Force announced that it had concluded its investigations into the two incidents, and that aside from a "stern warning" to Tin's friend, neither action was taken against either Tin or Seah.

Separately, the NSP also complained that the PAP had been distributing election material to residents in Tampines GRC in violation of cooling-off regulations.

== Returning officer ==
Yam Ah Mee was appointed by Prime Minister Lee Hsien Loong as Returning Officer for the 2011 presidential election. Yam announced the results of the four nominated candidates for the presidential election at 4:24am (GMT +8). Yam's robotic voice announcing the results for Aljunied GRC had turned into a mix just within a few hours ensuing the elections. Many took clips of his voice and mixed it with various styles of music, from electro to dance, on YouTube. In less than 24 hours after the release of the 2011 presidential election results, a club mix of Yam announcing the results was released on YouTube, by the same user responsible for the earlier club mix of Yam's general elections "performance". Yam has since explained that his "robotic" and "nasal" voice is due to an operation he had, to remove a fishbone in his larynx, although he has also said, explaining his impassive delivery to The Straits Times, that he "felt it was important to announce [the election results] clearly, concisely and impartially."

=== Yam Ah Mee ===
Yam Ah Mee (Chinese: 杨雅镁; pinyin: Yáng Yǎměi, born 2 July 1957) is a Singaporean former brigadier-general and civil servant who served as Chief Executive Director of the People's Association between 2010 and 2013. He is best known for his monotone voice and expressionless demeanour as the returning officer for the 2011 election. Yam was also the Returning Officer for the 2012 Hougang by-election. The 2013 Punggol East by-election was Yam's last appearance as Returning Officer.

Yam was educated at Hwa Chong Junior College, before graduating from the University of New South Wales with a first class honours degree in engineering. He graduated from the Royal Military College, Duntroon in Australia, with The Queens Medal in 1980, under a scholarship conferred by the Singapore Armed Forces (SAF). He also completed a Master of Business Administration degree at the National University of Singapore and a Master of Public Administration degree at Harvard University.

Yam had served in the Republic of Singapore Air Force (RSAF), rising to the position of Chief of Staff – Air Staff, commanding the ground-based, air-defence systems, which include the new Igla short range surface to air missiles, before retiring with the rank Brigadier-General, and entering the Civil Service.

Yam joined the Public Service Division in August 1998 and was appointed the Deputy Secretary (Development), and CEO and Dean of the Civil Service College. He was then posted to the Ministry of Transport (MOT) as Deputy Secretary (Sea and Air) on 1 June 2004 and was appointed Chief Executive of Land Transport Authority on 11 May 2005. He was also President of the Singapore Youth Flying Club for 8 years from 1998 to 2006. In 2008, Yam was awarded the Pingat Pentadbiran Awam (Emas) (Public Administration Medal (Gold)). On 1 May 2010, Yam was appointed Chief Executive Director-designate of the People's Association, and on 1 June 2010 fully assumed the position of Chief Executive Director, taking over from the retiring Tan Boon Huat.

After gaining media attention due to his role as the returning officer for the 2011 general election, Yam did a "spoof" video of himself, in which he announced PAssion Movie Night, held to celebrate a million PAssion Card memberships, in his trademark manner. In May, Yam filmed a video to promote a K-pop dance event on 29 May 2011, to be held at Ngee Ann City.

In January 2013, reports emerged that Yam had resigned from the PA and would leave the organisation by March, to be replaced by Ang Hak Seng, former Chief Executive for the Health Promotion Board. In an interview with RazorTV, he announced plans to pursue a career in the private sector after 36 years in the Civil Service. He held a farewell party on 28 March 2013 and ended his tenure at the PA on 31 March 2013.

Yam joined Sembcorp Design and Construction as its managing director on 16 April 2013. Yam starred in a musical held to celebrate the opening of the first 12 stations of the Circle line, on 2 October.

== Results ==
After polls closed at 8pm, vote counting began. Results were announced by the Returning Officer Yam Ah Mee, chief executive director of the People's Association. At 11.58pm (SGT), Mountbatten SMC, which had re-elected PAP candidate Lim Biow Chuan, was the first result to be called. The final constituency to be called was Potong Pasir SMC, which was announced at 2.51am, with the PAP's Sitoh Yih Pin unseated SPP's Lina Loh at a 0.72% margin (or 114 votes equivalent), following a recount.

While the PAP retained government control for the 13th consecutive election in addition to its supermajority, its vote majorities were reduced islandwide for a second election in a row, down to its lowest national vote share to 60.17%, slightly surpassing the 1991's share of 60.97%. The constituency with the best performing result for the PAP in this election was at Hong Kah North SMC with 70.61%, being the only one to score at least 70% for the election.

PAP won all but two constituencies with 81 out of 87 seats; the WP won the remaining six seats after successfully retaining Hougang SMC and for the first time since GRCs were introduced in 1988, WP had also won Aljunied GRC, the first instance where any opposition party won a GRC. Its victory also lead to the defeat of cabinet minister George Yeo and Lim Hwee Hua, who became the first two cabinet ministers to lose re-election since independence, with the last time being 1963 (minister Kenneth Michael Byrne lost his seat of Crawford). Furthermore, Hougang SMC clocked in the best performing result for WP at 64.80%, and the second-best performing result for any opposition party in post-independence Singapore's history, only behind 1991's Potong Pasir SMC's record of 69.64%.

The election also saw several records, with the elections of first female opposition MP Sylvia Lim and first Malay opposition MP Faisal Manap into Parliament. At 27 years of age, Marine Parade GRC MP Tin Pei Ling set a record of becoming the youngest MP-elect in post-independence, which was previously held by 29-year old Ho Kah Leong back in 1966. Her record would later be surpassed by 26-year old MP-elect Raeesah Khan in the 2020 elections. Both Tin and Alex Yam were also the first two millennial MPs to be elected into parliament, and Michael Palmer become the first ethnic minority MP to manage a SMC since the introduction of the GRC system.

Excluding electors in Tanjong Pagar GRC, voter turnout for the election was 93.18%, with 2,060,373 votes cast.

Popular vote
1. PAP (60.1%)
2. WP (12.8%)
3. NSP (12.0%)
4. SDP (4.83%)
5. RP (4.28%)
6. SPP (3.11%)
7. SDA (2.78%)
Elected seats won
1. 5 seats (PAP; uncontested) (5.75%)
2. 76 seats (PAP; contested) (87.4%)
3. 6 seats (WP) (6.89%)

Party	Votes	%	Seats	+/–
People's Action Party	1,212,154	60.14	81	–1
Workers' Party	258,510	12.83	8	+6
National Solidarity Party	242,682	12.04	0	New
Singapore Democratic Party	97,369	4.83	0	0
Reform Party	86,294	4.28	0	New
Singapore People's Party	62,639	3.11	1	New
Singapore Democratic Alliance	55,988	2.78	0	–1
Total	2,015,636	100.00	90	+5
Valid votes	2,015,636	97.83		
Invalid/blank votes	44,737	2.17		
Total votes	2,060,373	100.00		
Registered voters/turnout	2,350,873	93.18		
Source: Singapore Elections

Opposition parties Contested vote
Party	Votes
WP	46.60%
SPP	41.44%
NSP	39.26%
SDP	36.76%
RP	31.78%
SDA	30.06%

=== By constituency ===
Results of 2011 Singapore general election
Division	Seats	Voters	Party	Candidate(s)	Votes	Votes %	Overseas vote difference	Swing	Margins
Aljunied GRC	5	143,148	Workers' Party	Low Thia Khiang; Sylvia Lim; Chen Show Mao; Pritam Singh; Faisal Manap	72,289	54.72 / 100	▲0.01	▲10.81	9.44%
Aljunied GRC	5	143,148	People's Action Party	George Yeo; Lim Hwee Hua; Zainul Abidin; Cynthia Phua; Ong Ye Kung	59,829	45.28 / 100	▼0.01	▼10.81	9.44%
Ang Mo Kio GRC	6	179,071	People's Action Party	Lee Hsien Loong; Yeo Guat Kwang; Inderjit Singh; Seng Han Thong; Ang Hin Kee; Intan Azura Mokhtar	112,677	69.33 / 100	Steady	▲3.19	38.66%
Ang Mo Kio GRC	6	179,071	Reform Party	Alex Tan; Arthero Lim; Vignes Ramachandran; Lim Zi Rui; Mansor Rahman; Osman Sulaiman	49,851	30.67 / 100	Steady	▼3.19	38.66%
Bishan–Toa Payoh GRC	5	122,492	People's Action Party	Wong Kan Seng; Ng Eng Hen; Josephine Teo; Hri Kumar; Zainudin Nordin	62,385	56.93 / 100	▼0.01	N/A	13.86%
Bishan–Toa Payoh GRC	5	122,492	Singapore People's Party	Chiam See Tong; Benjamin Pwee; Wilfred Leung; Jimmy Lee; Mohamad Hamim bin Aliyas	47,205	43.07 / 100	▲0.01	N/A	13.86%
Chua Chu Kang GRC	5	158,648	People's Action Party	Gan Kim Yong; Alvin Yeo; Zaqy Mohamad; Alex Yam; Low Yen Ling	89,710	61.20 / 100	Steady	▲0.83	22.40%
Chua Chu Kang GRC	5	158,648	National Solidarity Party	Sebastian Teo; Tony Tan; Hazel Poa; Nor Lella Mardiiiah Mohamed; Jeisilan Sivalingam	56,885	38.80 / 100	Steady	N/A	22.40%
East Coast GRC	5	120,324	People's Action Party	Lim Swee Say; Maliki Osman; Lee Yi Shyan; Jessica Tan; Raymond Lim	59,992	54.83 / 100	Steady	▼9.03	9.66%
East Coast GRC	5	120,324	Workers' Party	Eric Tan; Png Eng Huat; Glenda Han; Gerald Giam (Note: Elected as NCMP.); Mohamed Fazli Bin Talip	49,429	45.17 / 100	Steady	▲9.03	9.66%
Holland–Bukit Timah GRC	4	91,607	People's Action Party	Vivian Balakrishnan; Christopher de Souza; Liang Eng Hwa; Sim Ann	48,773	60.08 / 100	▼0.02	N/A	20.16%
Holland–Bukit Timah GRC	4	91,607	Singapore Democratic Party	Tan Jee Say; Ang Yong Guan; Vincent Wijeysingha; Michelle Lee	32,406	39.92 / 100	▲0.02	N/A	20.16%
Jurong GRC	5	125,276	People's Action Party	Tharman Shanmugaratnam; Halimah Yacob; Ang Wei Neng; Desmond Lee; David Ong	76,595	66.96 / 100	Steady	N/A	33.92%
Jurong GRC	5	125,276	National Solidarity Party	Christopher Neo; Abdul Rasheed; Elvin Ong; Ong Hock Siong; Noraini Yunus	37,786	33.04 / 100	Steady	N/A	33.92%
Marine Parade GRC	5	154,451	People's Action Party	Goh Chok Tong; Tan Chuan-Jin; Fatimah Lateef; Seah Kian Peng; Tin Pei Ling	78,286	56.64 / 100	▼0.01	N/A	13.28%
Marine Parade GRC	5	154,451	National Solidarity Party	Cheo Chai Chen; Ivan Yeo; Abdul Salim Harun; Spencer Ng; Nicole Seah	59,926	43.36 / 100	▲0.01	N/A	13.28%
Moulmein–Kallang GRC	4	87,595	People's Action Party	Lui Tuck Yew; Yaacob Ibrahim; Denise Phua; Edwin Tong	44,886	58.55 / 100	▼0.01	N/A	17.10%
Moulmein–Kallang GRC	4	87,595	Workers' Party	Mohd Rahizan; Toh Hong Boon; L Somasundram; Frieda Chan	31,773	41.45 / 100	▲0.01	N/A	17.10%
Nee Soon GRC	5	148,290	People's Action Party	K. Shanmugam; Muhammad Faishal Ibrahim; Lee Bee Wah; Lim Wee Kiak; Patrick Tay	80,740	58.40 / 100	▲0.01	N/A	16.80%
Nee Soon GRC	5	148,290	Workers' Party	John Yam; Angela Faye Oon; Sajeev K. R. Kamalasanan; Watson Chong; Poh Lee Guan	57,523	41.60 / 100	▼0.01	N/A	16.80%
Pasir Ris–Punggol GRC	6	168,971	People's Action Party	Teo Chee Hean; Teo Ser Luck; Penny Low; Janil Puthucheary; Gan Thiam Poh; Zainal Sapari	100,493	64.79 / 100	Steady	▼3.91	29.58%
Pasir Ris–Punggol GRC	6	168,971	Singapore Democratic Alliance	Harminder Pal Singh; Sidney Soon; Jeffrey Lim; Lee Song Juan; Tan Keng Hong; Mohammad Shafni Ahmad	54,601	35.21 / 100	Steady	▲3.91	29.58%
Sembawang GRC	5	142,459	People's Action Party	Khaw Boon Wan; Ellen Lee; Hawazi Daipi; Ong Teng Koon; Vikram Nair	84,252	63.9 / 100	▲0.01	▼12.8	27.80%
Sembawang GRC	5	142,459	Singapore Democratic Party	James Gomez; John Tan; Jarrod Luo; Mohd Isa Abdul Aziz; Sadasivam Veriyah	47,605	36.1 / 100	▼0.01	▲12.8	27.80%
Tampines GRC	5	137,532	People's Action Party	Mah Bow Tan; Irene Ng; Masagos Zulkifli; Baey Yam Keng; Heng Swee Keat	72,728	57.22 / 100	Steady	▼11.29	14.44%
Tampines GRC	5	137,532	National Solidarity Party	Goh Meng Seng; Reno Fong; Syafarin Sarif; Raymond Lim; Gilbert Goh	54,381	42.78 / 100	Steady	N/A	14.44%
Tanjong Pagar GRC	5	139,771	People's Action Party	Lee Kuan Yew; Lily Neo; Indranee Rajah; Chan Chun Sing; Chia Shi-Lu	Uncontested Walkover				
West Coast GRC	5	121,045	People's Action Party	Lim Hng Kiang; Arthur Fong; S. Iswaran; Foo Mee Har; Lawrence Wong	72,563	66.57 / 100	Steady	N/A	33.14%
West Coast GRC	5	121,045	Reform Party	Kenneth Jeyaretnam; Frankie Low; Andy Zhu; Kumar Appavoo; Haren Hu	36,443	33.43 / 100	Steady	N/A	33.14%
Bukit Panjang SMC	1	33,053	People's Action Party	Teo Ho Pin	20,375	66.27 / 100	▲0.01	▼10.91	32.54%
Bukit Panjang SMC	1	33,053	Singapore Democratic Party	Alec Tok	10,372	33.73 / 100	▼0.01	▲10.91	32.54%
Hong Kah North SMC	1	27,701	People's Action Party	Amy Khor	18,156	70.61 / 100	N/A	41.22%	
Hong Kah North SMC	1	27,701	Singapore People's Party	Sin Kek Tong	7,556	29.39 / 100	N/A	41.22%	
Hougang SMC	1	24,560	Workers' Party	Yaw Shin Leong	14,850	64.8 / 100	▲0.01	▲2.06	29.60%
Hougang SMC	1	24,560	People's Action Party	Desmond Choo	8,065	35.2 / 100	▼0.01	▼2.06	29.60%
Joo Chiat SMC	1	22,069	People's Action Party	Charles Chong	9,666	51.02 / 100	▲0.01	▼13.99	2.04%
Joo Chiat SMC	1	22,069	Workers' Party	Yee Jenn Jong	9,278	48.98 / 100	▼0.01	▲13.99	2.04%
Mountbatten SMC	1	23,731	People's Action Party	Lim Biow Chuan	11,985	58.62 / 100	▼0.03	N/A	17.24%
Mountbatten SMC	1	23,731	National Solidarity Party	Jeannette Chong-Aruldoss	8,461	41.38 / 100	▲0.03	N/A	17.24%
Pioneer SMC	1	25,745	People's Action Party	Cedric Foo	14,593	60.73 / 100	Steady	N/A	21.46%
Pioneer SMC	1	25,745	National Solidarity Party	Steve Chia	9,437	39.27 / 100	Steady	N/A	21.46%
Potong Pasir SMC	1	17,327	People's Action Party	Sitoh Yih Pin	7,992	50.36 / 100	Steady	▲6.18	0.72%
Potong Pasir SMC	1	17,327	Singapore People's Party	Lina Chiam	7,878	49.64 / 100	Steady	▼6.18	0.72%
Punggol East SMC	1	33,281	People's Action Party	Michael Palmer	16,994	54.54 / 100	▲0.01	N/A	13.53%
Punggol East SMC	1	33,281	Workers' Party	Lee Li Lian	12,777	41.01 / 100	▼0.01	N/A	13.53%
Punggol East SMC	1	33,281	Singapore Democratic Alliance (Loses S$16,000 deposit)	Desmond Lim	1,387	4.45 / 100	Steady	N/A	13.53%
Radin Mas SMC	1	31,014	People's Action Party	Sam Tan	18,609	67.10 / 100	▲0.01	N/A	34.20%
Radin Mas SMC	1	31,014	National Solidarity Party	Yip Yew Weng	9,123	32.90 / 100	▼0.01	N/A	34.20%
Sengkang West SMC	1	26,882	People's Action Party	Lam Pin Min	14,689	58.11 / 100	▲0.03	N/A	16.22%
Sengkang West SMC	1	26,882	Workers' Party	Koh Choong Yong	10,591	41.89 / 100	▼0.03	N/A	16.22%
Whampoa SMC	1	21,622	People's Action Party	Heng Chee How	13,028	66.10 / 100	▼0.01	N/A	32.20%
Whampoa SMC	1	21,622	National Solidarity Party	Ken Sun	6,680	33.90 / 100	▲0.01	N/A	32.20%
Yuhua SMC	1	23,195	People's Action Party	Grace Fu	14,093	66.86 / 100	▼0.01	N/A	33.72%
Yuhua SMC	1	23,195	Singapore Democratic Party	Teo Soh Lung	6,986	33.14 / 100	▲0.01	N/A	33.72%

=== By Community Development Council ===
While the PAP scored its lowest vote share in post-independence Singapore, two opposition parties, the NSP and the WP, who have fielded more than 20 candidates, are the only two opposition parties outside PAP to garner at least 12% of the overall popular vote this election, contributing nearly a quarter of the overall contested vote. NSP didn't field any candidates in the North West CDC, and neither WP fielding any in the South West CDC. The top performing region this election was the South West CDC (which also include the top scoring Hong Kah North SMC), followed by the Central Singapore CDC (which had PM Lee's Ang Mo Kio GRC and the sole walkover constituency of Tanjong Pagar GRC). Along with the aforementioned two CDC, North West CDC also had PAP's contested vote shares polling above national average.

Comparing WP and NSP's contested vote shares that are common in the three CDCs, WP outperformed NSP in two of them, being in Central and North East CDC, the latter was PAP's low-scoring CDC in this election in addition to WP electing Aljunied GRC and Hougang SMC as the only two opposition-held constituencies this election; the South East CDC had NSP prevailing the contested vote despite WP had East Coast GRC and Joo Chiat SMC electing narrowly on both constituencies, as the electorate in Marine Parade GRC is larger than East Coast.

The other four parties contributed a combined 15.00% of the overall popular vote, with the Central CDC scoring 23.99% having the higher vote share among the four participating regions in that election (the exception was the South East CDC), followed by Northwest's 23.66%. The Central CDC also contained the constituency with the narrowest result of Potong Pasir SMC.

==== Votes polled ====
CDC				
CDC	PAP	WP	NSP	Others
Central	62.71%	9.69%	3.61%	23.99%
Northeast	55.11%	21.33%	11.61%	11.95%
Northwest	61.29%	15.06%		23.66%
Southeast	55.72%	20.45%	23.83%	
Southwest	64.82%		23.62%	11.57%
TOTAL	60.14%	12.83%	12.04%	15.00%

==== Seats won ====
CDC	Seats				
CDC	Seats	PAP	WP	NSP	Others
Central	24	24	0	0	0
Northeast	18	12	6	0	0
Northwest	15	15	0		0
Southeast	12	12	0	0	
Southwest	18	18		0	0
TOTAL	87	81	6	0	0

=== Analysis ===
==== Top 10 best PAP performers ====
- Constituencies with no comparison to 2006 were either due to them being new constituencies or the constituencies experiencing walkovers in the last election.

#	Constituency	People's Action Party			Opposition			
#	Constituency	Votes	%	Swing		Votes	%	Swing
1	Hong Kah North SMC	18,156	70.61	New	Singapore People's Party	7,556	29.39	New
2	Ang Mo Kio GRC	112,677	69.33	▲3.19	Reform Party	49,851	30.67	▼3.19
3	Radin Mas SMC	18,609	67.10	New	National Solidarity Party	9,123	32.90	New
4	Jurong GRC	76,595	66.96	Walkover	National Solidarity Party	37,786	33.04	Walkover
5	Yuhua SMC	14,093	66.86	New	Singapore Democratic Party	6,986	33.14	New
6	West Coast GRC	72,563	66.57	Walkover	Reform Party	36,443	33.43	Walkover
7	Bukit Panjang SMC	20,375	66.27	▼10.91	Singapore Democratic Party	10,372	33.73	▲10.91
8	Whampoa SMC	13,028	66.10	New	National Solidarity Party	6,683	33.90	New
9	Pasir Ris–Punggol GRC	100,493	64.79	▼3.91	Singapore Democratic Alliance	54,601	35.21	▲3.91
10	Sembawang GRC	84,252	63.9	▼12.8	Singapore Democratic Party	47,605	36.1	▲12.8

==== Top 10 best opposition performers ====
- Constituencies with no comparison to 2006 were either due to them being new constituencies or the constituencies experiencing walkovers in the last election. (Note: Punggol East SMC is excluded from the table as there were two opposition parties which competed against the incumbent. If the opposition parties for Punggol East SMC were to sum up (WP had 12,765 votes (41.02%) and SDA had 1,386 votes (4.45%)), the opposition won 14,151 votes (45.47%) while PAP had 16,969 votes (54.52%), which would place it fifth in the table below while WP would place on 13th.)

Constituency		Opposition				People's Action Party		
Constituency		Votes		%	Swing	Votes	%	Swing
1	Hougang SMC	Workers' Party	14,850	64.80	▲2.10	8,065	35.20	▼2.10
2	Aljunied GRC	Workers' Party	72,289	54.72	▲10.81	59,829	45.28	▼10.81
3	Potong Pasir SMC	Singapore People's Party	7,878	49.64	▼6.18	7,992	50.36	▲6.18
4	Joo Chiat SMC	Workers' Party	9,278	48.98	▲13.99	9,666	51.02	▼13.99
5	East Coast GRC	Workers' Party	49,429	45.17	▲9.03	59,992	54.83	▼9.03
6	Marine Parade GRC	National Solidarity Party	59,926	43.36	Walkover	78,286	56.64	Walkover
7	Bishan–Toa Payoh GRC	Singapore People's Party	47,205	43.07	Walkover	62,385	56.93	Walkover
8	Tampines GRC	National Solidarity Party	54,381	42.78	▲11.29	72,728	57.22	▼11.29
9	Sengkang West SMC	Workers' Party	10,591	41.89	New	14,689	58.11	New
10	Nee Soon GRC	Workers' Party	57,523	41.60	New	80,740	58.40	New

==== Top 10 Vote Swings ====
- Only the following constituencies may be compared with 2006 results as they existed in both elections, although most had changes in their electoral boundaries. (Note: If Moulmein-Kallang GRC is considered an existing constituency due to the renaming of Jalan Besar GRC, the results would see a 10.71% swing, which would have placed it sixth in the table.)

Constituency		People's Action Party			Opposition			
Constituency		2006 %	2011 %	Swing	Party	2006 %	2011 %	Swing
1	Joo Chiat SMC	63.01%	51.02%	▼13.99%	Workers' Party	34.99%	48.98%	▲13.99%
2	Sembawang GRC	76.70%	63.90%	▼12.80%	Singapore Democratic Party	23.30%	36.10%	▲12.80%
3	Tampines GRC	68.51%	57.22%	▼11.29%	National Solidarity Party	31.49%	42.78%	▲11.29%
4	Bukit Panjang SMC	77.18%	66.27%	▼10.91%	Singapore Democratic Party	22.82%	33.73%	▲10.91%
5	Aljunied GRC	56.09%	45.28%	▼10.81%	Workers' Party	43.91%	54.72%	▲10.81%
6	East Coast GRC	63.86%	54.83%	▼9.03%	Workers' Party	36.14%	45.17%	▲9.03%
7	Potong Pasir SMC	55.82%	50.36%	▲6.18%	Singapore People's Party	55.82%	49.64%	▼6.18%
8	Pasir Ris–Punggol GRC	68.70%	64.79%	▼3.91%	Singapore Democratic Alliance	31.30%	35.21%	▲3.91%
9	Ang Mo Kio GRC	66.14%	69.33%	▲3.19%	Reform Party	33.86%	30.87%	▼3.19%
10	Hougang SMC	37.26%	35.20%	▼2.06%	Workers' Party	62.74%	64.80%	▲2.06%

Interpretive maps

Vote share won by the ruling People's Action Party by constituency. There was no contest in Tanjong Pagar Group Representation Constituency as there was a walkover.

== Post-election events ==
=== Ruling party's immediate reactions ===
The PAP's secretary-general, Prime Minister Lee Hsien Loong, described the results as delivering his party a "clear mandate to form the next government". In his post-election press conference, Lee said the polls had "heightened (voters') political consciousness and awareness", and admitted that "many of them desire to see more opposition voices in Parliament to check the PAP government". He described the PAP's loss of Aljunied GRC, which resulted in George Yeo being voted out of Parliament and losing his position as foreign minister, as a "heavy loss to my Cabinet and my team of MPs", but said that the party would "accept and respect the voters' decision". The country's Senior Minister, Goh Chok Tong, also admitted that "there is a sea change in the political landscape" after his team won Marine Parade Group Representation Constituency with just 56.6 percent of the vote.

The third cabinet was announced two weeks later where extensive changes were made to the cabinet, and several ministers announcing stepping down from the cabinet, including Deputy Prime Minister Wong Kan Seng, Senior Minister Goh Chok Tong, and Minister Mentor Lee Kuan Yew. Finance Minister Tharman Shanmugaratnam succeeded Wong as the new DPM, with existing DPM Teo Chee Hean named the new successor to the Coordinating Minister for National Security. Two new MPs were given cabinet portfolios, with Chan Chun Sing given the acting Minister for Community Development, Youth and Sports, and Heng Swee Keat as the Minister for Education, making Heng only the second MP to be ascended directly to cabinet minister, after Richard Hu. It was also announced that Michael Palmer would be named the new Speaker of the Parliament of Singapore, replacing outgoing speaker Abdullah Tarmugi.

=== Opposition parties' immediate reactions ===
The Workers Party's secretary-general Low Thia Khiang said his team's win in Aljunied was "historic" and meant that voters had "accepted the WP as a rational, responsible and respected party". In his victory speech, Low declared his win as a "political landmark in modern Singapore". He added that it meant the electorate wanted to tell the PAP to be "a more responsive, inclusive, transparent and accountable government”.

In a statement on its website, the Singapore Democratic Party thanked its supporters for their support, saying that it was for them that the party "(continues) to labour on in this undemocratic system with all the odds stacked against us." Its assistant treasurer Vincent Wijeysingha, who stood in Holland–Bukit Timah Group Representation Constituency, said that the party's positive vote swing in its contested wards of almost 13 percent from the last elections was an "indicator that things are beginning to move up for our party." In a second statement on its website, the SDP described its results as "disappointing", but promised to "build on the foundation that we have laid" for the next elections. The party's secretary-general Chee Soon Juan, barred from standing in the election, went on to write an opinion piece for the Guardian, in which he said it "would have been a miracle" had the SDP won any seats, and accused the media in Singapore of suppressing news of the SDP's campaigning.

Other than the PAP and WP, the only other opposition seat pre-election had been held by the Singapore People's Party, which lost it in the polls by just 114 votes. Chiam See Tong, the SPP's secretary-general, said his party would fight to win back Potong Pasir Single Member Constituency, and said that despite being defeated in Bishan–Toa Payoh Group Representation Constituency, he would continue in politics, health permitting. He also questioned the margin of votes in Potong Pasir, contested by his wife, saying there was "funny business" happening. A petition calling for a by-election in the constituency was started by SPP supporters and Potong Pasir residents.

The National Solidarity Party, which contested the most seats of all opposition parties, admitted it may have taken on too much, with its leader Goh Meng Seng telling reporters that he would be "personally responsible" for the party's failure to win a single seat. Its star candidate, Nicole Seah, said Singaporeans now had to unite as a country. Seah, who contested in Marine Parade, also said there was "so much that needs to be done", and that she would continue her work in the area despite her team's defeat. On 26 June, Goh announced his resignation from the party.

The leader of the newest opposition party contesting the elections, the Reform Party's Kenneth Jeyaretnam, described his party as having "learnt a lot" and said they had "done very well", as the first new party in over 20 years. He added that the party was "very happy" at its result in West Coast Group Representation Constituency, and that its second team had done "creditably" in Ang Mo Kio Group Representation Constituency. Jeyaretnam also said the team being able to win the votes it did despite being a new party meant that its "core values resonate with the voters".

The worst-performing party at the polls was the Singapore Democratic Alliance, whose secretary-general Desmond Lim polled under 5 percent of votes in Punggol East Single Member Constituency (the sole three-cornered contest), being the only candidate to lost his S$16,000 election deposit this election. He said voters had voted based on brand name, as the other opposition candidate in the ward was from the WP. The SDA also contested Pasir Ris–Punggol Group Representation Constituency, and Lim said the party was "very happy" at its positive vote swing from 2006 of over 4 percent. However, the SDA's anchorman in the constituency Harminder Pal Singh described the loss as a "time for painful reflection" and said the party would work harder to win more votes.

=== Foreign reactions ===
At an ASEAN heads-of-state meeting in Jakarta, Indonesia, leaders of ASEAN nations reportedly told S. Jayakumar, Singapore's representative at the event, that they were "saddened, disappointed and surprised" at the news that foreign minister Yeo had been defeated, according to the state-run Straits Times, while at the same meeting the Prime Minister of Malaysia, Najib Tun Razak, said the PAP's win would mean a continuity in understanding between the Malaysian and Singaporean governments on bilateral issues. The BBC described it as a landmark result.

=== Non-Constituency Member of Parliament offers ===
Three Non-Constituency Members of Parliament (NCMP) seats were offered after the election to the top three losing opposition candidates, all of which were confirmed on 16 May. The Singapore People's Party accepted the seat for Lina Loh, ensuring that the Chiam family retained representation in Parliament. While Chiam See Tong has said he is opposed to the scheme, the SPP reasoned that it was "critical" to ensure an "alternative voice in Parliament", to allow the party to "remain engaged in national issues", and to be publicly visible until the next election due by 2016. Loh also pointed out that she was "influenced by the wishes of Potong Pasir residents" and she accepted the post as her losing margin was too small.

The Workers' Party was offered the final two NCMP seats for having the second and third best performing losing candidates, which it accepted despite Low also disputing the scheme. Yee Jenn Jong was thus appointed for his performance in Joo Chiat SMC, but as it had to choose one member from the East Coast GRC team, the younger Gerald Giam was chosen over team leader and party treasurer Eric Tan as part of its leadership renewal process. Tan resigned from the party, citing his disagreement with the appointment.

The decision for the NCMP later become a flashpoint topic in the 2012 Hougang by-election took place one year later after information containing details of the CEC's decision was leaked online; it was revealed where the CEC conducted a secret ballot to decide the NCMP, where Giam was chosen as NCMP with seven votes, while Tan received five, and Png Eng Huat, the eventual MP-elect for Hougang, received with one despite him being opposed of the NCMP scheme. The WP apologized to the media following the leak and acknowledged the incident, but decide not to proceed further.

=== By-elections ===
During the parliamentary term following this election, two seats fell vacant throughout 2012 after the MPs resigned following allegations about extramarital affairs. The first was Hougang SMC MP Yaw Shin Leong on 14 February, and the other was Speaker and Punggol East SMC MP Michael Palmer on 12 December.

This were the first two by-elections to be called in nearly two decades after the 1992 Marine Parade by-election. In the ensuing by-elections, former East Coast GRC WP candidate Png Eng Huat and two-time Punggol East SMC WP candidate Lee Li Lian respectively won those by-elections. Consequently, it was also the second time where a seat changed hands to the opposition after 1981.

=== Exit poll ===
On 3 September, Joseph Ong Chor Teck was arrested for conducting exit poll through Temasek Review, a socio-political website, ahead of the election. It was announced that Ong was released on bail pending further investigations as of 17 October. Conducting exit polls during the election period between the time where the writ of election is issued and election day is an offence under the Parliamentary Election Act, with penalties of a maximum S$1,500 fine or up to a year's imprisonment or both.

== Reactions ==
=== Rise and use of social media ===
The election saw wider use of the internet and social media compared to 2006. Many turned to online platforms to bypass mass media in Singapore, which was seen as heavily favouring the ruling PAP. There was a public perception that major state-owned newspapers and broadcasters supported the party's stance and that the electoral system placed opposition parties at a disadvantage. Alternative media was limited until the 2000s, when news sites, blogs and social platforms such as Facebook and Twitter emerged. These gained some influence by 2006 and became especially prominent after 2011. According to The Economist, the PAP's aggressive modernisation of Singapore created "one of the world's most wired societies," leading to new media that "transformed" the electoral scene in Singapore. Characterising the state-run mainstream press as "docile", the British magazine also argued that this also forced significantly more news coverage of the opposition than in previous elections, since the mainstream media feared their readership deserting them. One blogger from CNN claimed, "Thanks to social media, it doesn't matter that the country's largely state-run media leans towards reporting the actions of the PAP, no one's reading anyway." The Economist however was more cynical in its analysis of the election: "in Singapore, winning 7% of parliamentary seats is tantamount to an opposition triumph".

=== Reactions to Aljunied GRC's result ===
Traditionally regarded as one of the PAP "fortresses", this marked the first instance where the opposition captured a GRC since the scheme was formed in 1988, five elections prior, where the oppositions had unsuccessfully done so due to ostensible requirements of ensuring minority representation in parliament and extensive resources. GRCs comprised about 86% of the seats, but oppositions in previous elections would only contest "less than half the seats". The election saw the most extensive use of co-ordination to avoid "three-cornered fights" and was also notable for seeing "two veteran MPs" making immense risks by choosing to contest in GRCs rather than their traditional SMC safe seats.

With the PAP's team defeated in Aljunied GRC, four of the five members, including Foreign Minister George Yeo and Minister in the Prime Minister's Office Lim Hwee Hua, announced their retirements from politics in separate news conferences given in the days after the election. George Yeo, who remained popular online and continued to have "a flood of support" after the election and had been repeatedly urged to contest the next election, or even contest the 2011 Singaporean presidential election turned his supporters down, declaring, "I'm a free spirit, and I don't think I'm temperamentally suited for such a job." A fifth candidate, Ong Ye Kung, however, would continue to work in private sector and would later join their team in Sembawang GRC in the next election.

=== Signals to the ruling party ===
The election results were widely used in national and international discussions that the population was trying to send a message to a ruling party that "can also come across as smug, arrogant and high-handed" despite a win margin of over 20%, which usually counts as a landslide victory for most democratic nations but has been one of the narrowest margins since 1965. The last election with a similarly narrow victory occurred in the 1963 Singapore general election, when the PAP's major opponent was the Barisan Sosialis—which in itself was a splinter group formed from the leftist wing of the PAP, where it had comprised 80% of the PAP grassroots membership, 35 out of the PAP's 51 branch committees and 19 of its 23 organising secretaries. According to the Economist, Singaporeans would prefer not to have an alternative government but a humbler one, as well as a "stronger opposition".

On 14 May, exactly a week after the election, Senior Minister Goh Chok Tong and Minister Mentor Lee Kuan Yew announced in a joint statement that they would be quitting the country's Cabinet, saying it was time for a "team of younger ministers" to "engage with this young generation in shaping the future of Singapore." In a similar analysis by Bloomberg, the resignations and the ensuing cabinet reshuffle were the actions of a ruling party "seeking to overhaul its image with voters" whose "narrowest election victory on record signaled a shortfall in support among younger voters". Analysts such as Citigroup economist Kit Wei Zheng believed that Lee had somewhat contributed to the PAP's lackluster performance in a local context.

Lee Kuan Yew was also quoted as saying that a younger generation was required to "carry Singapore forward in a more difficult and complex situation" while Lee Hsien Loong declared the party "would change the way it governs" and do some "soul-searching". Singapore Management University (SMU) professor Eugene Tan said that "[The PAP] will have to demonstrate that it remains a mass movement, and not [Lee Kuan Yew]'s alter ego," noting that younger Singaporeans do not see Lee Kuan Yew with the same "godlike perception" as older Singaporeans born before 1980.

With the vacation of the Senior Minister roles, the role remained vacant for the next eight years until on 1 May 2019 following Heng Swee Keat's ascension of Deputy Prime Minister of Singapore. Goh was also conferred the title of "Emeritus Senior Minister".

== See also ==
- Elections in Singapore
- Constituencies of Singapore
- List of Singaporean electoral divisions
- List of political parties in Singapore
- 2011 Singaporean presidential election - second national election held three months after the election
- 2012 Hougang by-election and 2013 Punggol East by-election – two by-elections held after the election
