= Remaking Singapore Committee =

Singaporean government committee

The Remaking Singapore Committee (RSC) was established in February 2002 to complement the work of the Economic Review Committee of Singapore. It was led by then-Minister of State for National Development Vivian Balakrishnan.
