= Holland–Bukit Timah Group Representation Constituency =

Electoral division in Singapore

Holland–Bukit Timah
- Group representation constituency for the Parliament of Singapore
- Region: Central, North and West Regions, Singapore
- Electorate: 123,225

Current constituency
- Created: 2006; 20 years ago
- Seats: 4
- Party: People's Action Party
- Members: Sim Ann; Vivian Balakrishnan; Christopher de Souza; Edward Chia
- Town Council: Holland–Bukit Panjang
- Created from: Bukit Timah SMC; Holland–Bukit Panjang GRC

The Holland–Bukit Timah Group Representation Constituency (Note: Malay: Kawasan Undi Perwakilan Berkumpulan Holland–Bukit Timah; Chinese: 荷兰–武吉知马集选区; Tamil: ஹோலண்ட்–புக்கிட் தீமா குழுத்தொகுதி) is a four-member group representation constituency (GRC) situated in central, western and northern Singapore. It has four divisions: Bukit Timah, Cashew, Ulu Pandan and Zhenghua, managed by Holland–Bukit Panjang Town Council (HBPTC). The current Members of Parliament (MPs) for the constituency are Edward Chia, Christopher de Souza, Second Minister for Home and Foreign Affairs Sim Ann and Minister for Foreign Affairs Vivian Balakrishnan from the People's Action Party (PAP).

== History ==
=== 2006: Creation and walkover ===
Prior to the 2006 general election, the five-member Holland–Bukit Panjang GRC was abolished. Its Bukit Panjang division was carved out as Bukit Panjang Single Member Constituency (SMC); the rest of the GRC was merged with Bukit Timah SMC to form the five-member Holland–Bukit Timah GRC. The PAP won unopposed.

=== 2011: Downsizing and first contest (by SDP) ===
During the 2011 general election, Holland–Bukit Timah GRC lost a seat in Parliament to become a four-member GRC. The PAP defeated the Singapore Democratic Party (SDP) with 60.08% of the vote.

=== 2015: Entry of Chee Soon Juan ===
During the 2015 general election, Chee Soon Juan, the secretary-general of the SDP, led the party's team for Holland–Bukit Timah GRC, in his first political candidacy since the 2001 general election. He had been excluded from the 2006 and 2011 general elections after becoming bankrupt due to defamation lawsuits by the leadership of the PAP, as well as imprisonment for civil disobedience. The PAP defeated the SDP with 66.6% of the vote.

=== 2020: Redeployment of Liang Eng Hwa ===
During the 2020 general election, Teo Ho Pin, the incumbent MP for Bukit Panjang SMC, retired from politics. Liang Eng Hwa, the incumbent MP for the Zhenghua division of Holland–Bukit Timah GRC, was redeployed to retain the SMC for the PAP; he was replaced by Edward Chia, a political newcomer. The PAP defeated the SDP with 66.36% of the vote.

=== 2025: Exit of SDP ===
During the 2025 general election, Holland–Bukit Timah GRC absorbed a polling district from the defunct Jurong GRC; at the same election, the SDP exited Holland–Bukit Timah GRC in favour of Red Dot United (RDU), another opposition party. The PAP defeated RDU with 79.25% of the vote, the best performance for the former in the GRC since its creation.

== Constituency profile ==
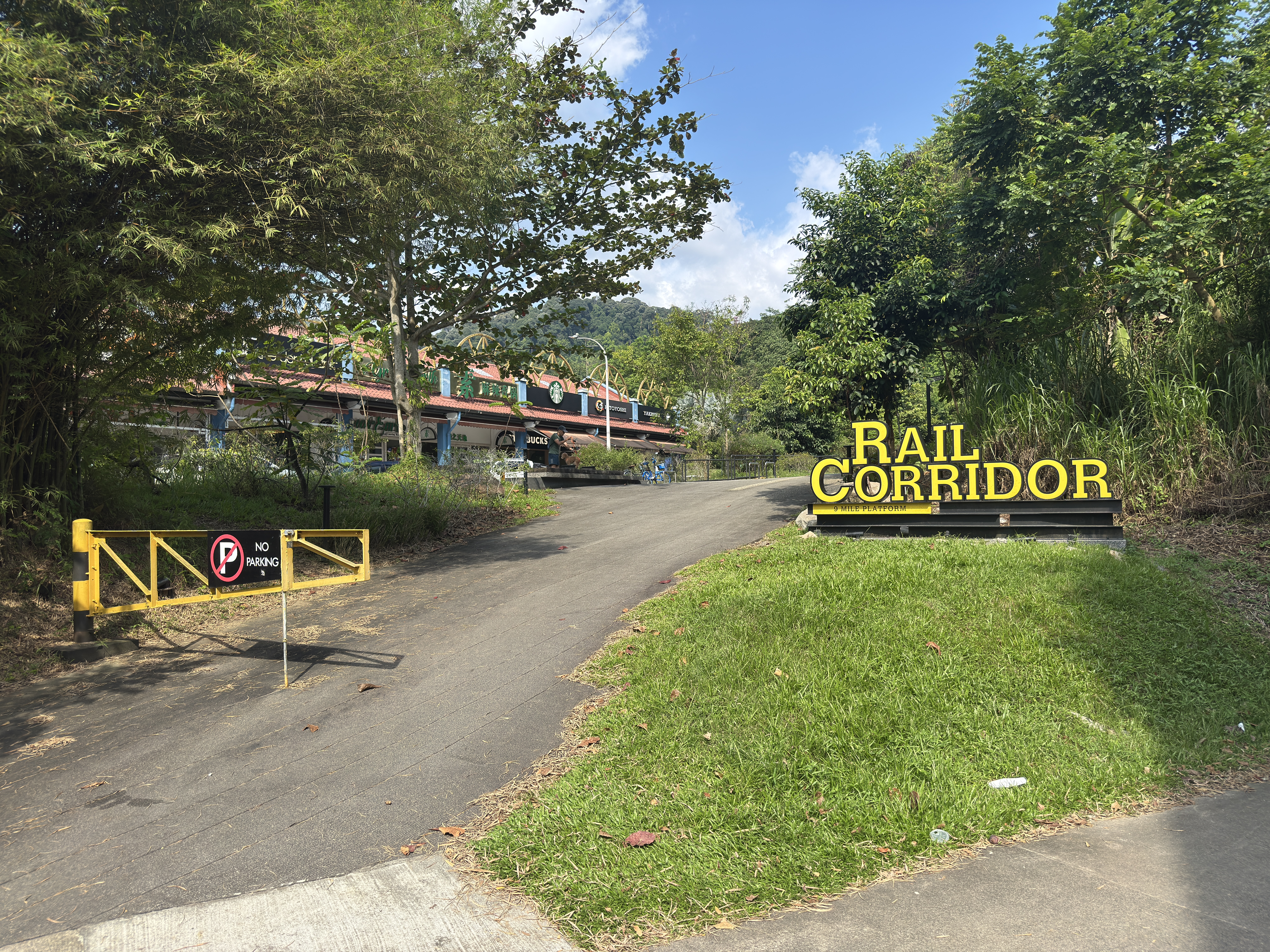
A significant portion of the Rail Corridor passes through Holland–Bukit Timah GRC

A large portion of Holland–Bukit Timah GRC is made up of greenery and nature reserves, namely the Bukit Timah Nature Reserve, the Rifle Range Nature Park, the Central Water Catchment and the preserved Bukit Timah railway station as part of the Rail Corridor. The parks of the Mandai Wildlife Reserve are also located in the constituency.

Holland–Bukit Timah GRC is known as one of the wealthiest constituencies in Singapore, because of an above-average rate of multimillion-dollar private housing, (Note: As of 2025, 31.9% of the constituency's population lived in condominiums and 14.1% lived in landed property. The total of 46% living in private housing is more than double the national average of under 20%.) predominantly owned by the wealthiest residents of the country. As such, it has been nicknamed the "rich man's ward" or "rich man's GRC". However, HDB estates, (Note: Estates in Singapore consist of public apartments, or "flats", built by the Housing and Development Board (HDB).) concentrated in Bukit Panjang (excluding the SMC) and Ghim Moh, are more middle-income.

== Members of Parliament ==
Divisions or wards of Holland–Bukit Timah GRC as of the 2025 general election:
1 Bukit Timah
2 Cashew
3 Ulu Pandan
4 Zhenghua

Year	Division	Members of Parliament	Party
Formation
2006	Bukit Timah; Buona Vista; Cashew; Ulu Pandan; Zhenghua	Yu-Foo Yee Shoon; Lim Swee Say; Vivian Balakrishnan; Christopher de Souza; Liang Eng Hwa	PAP
2011	Bukit Timah; Cashew; Ulu Pandan; Zhenghua	Sim Ann; Vivian Balakrishnan; Christopher de Souza; Liang Eng Hwa	PAP
2015	Bukit Timah; Cashew; Ulu Pandan; Zhenghua	Sim Ann; Vivian Balakrishnan; Christopher de Souza; Liang Eng Hwa	PAP
2020	Bukit Timah; Cashew; Ulu Pandan; Zhenghua	Sim Ann; Vivian Balakrishnan; Christopher de Souza; Edward Chia	PAP
2025	Bukit Timah; Cashew; Ulu Pandan; Zhenghua	Sim Ann; Vivian Balakrishnan; Christopher de Souza; Edward Chia	PAP

== Electoral results ==
Note: The Elections Department does not include rejected votes when calculating the vote shares of candidates. Hence, all candidates' vote shares will total to 100% at any given election (may not appear so in multi-way contests due to rounding).

=== Elections in 2000s ===
General Election 2006: Holland Bukit-Timah GRC
Party	Candidate	Votes	%
PAP	Lim Swee Say; Yu-Foo Yee Shoon; Vivian Balakrishnan; Liang Eng Hwa; Christopher de Souza	Unopposed	
Registered electors		118,092	
PAP win (new seat)			

=== Elections in 2010s ===
General Election 2011
Party	Candidate	Votes	%	±%
PAP	Vivian Balakrishnan Sim Ann Liang Eng Hwa Christopher de Souza	48,773	60.08	N/A
SDP	Tan Jee Say Ang Yong Guan Vincent Wijeysingha Michelle Lee	32,406	39.92	N/A
Majority		16,367	20.16	N/A
Turnout		82,899	90.5%	N/A
PAP hold		Swing	N/A	

General Election 2015
Party	Candidate	Votes	%	±%
PAP	Vivian Balakrishnan Sim Ann Liang Eng Hwa Christopher de Souza	62,786	66.60	▲6.50
SDP	Chee Soon Juan Paul Tambyah Sidek Mallek Chong Wai Fung	31,494	33.40	▼6.50
Majority		31,292	33.20	▲13.04
Rejected ballots		1,506	1.6	
Turnout		95,786	91.7	−
PAP hold		Swing	▲6.50	

=== Elections in 2020s ===
General Election 2020: Holland Bukit-Timah GRC
Party	Candidate	Votes	%	±%
PAP	Vivian Balakrishnan Sim Ann Christopher de Souza Edward Chia	71,218	66.36	▼0.24
SDP	Tan Jee Say James Gomez Min Cheong Alfred Tan	36,100	33.64	▲0.24
Majority		35,118	32.72	
Total valid votes		107,318	99.09	
Rejected ballots		1,999	0.91	
Turnout		109,317	95.08	▲3.67
Registered electors		114,973		
PAP hold		Swing	▼0.24	

General Election 2025
Party	Candidate	Votes	%	±%
PAP	Vivian Balakrishnan Sim Ann Christopher de Souza Edward Chia	86,936	79.25	▲12.89
RDU	Fazli Talip Sharad Kumar Emily Woo Nizar Subair	22,762	20.75	N/A
Majority		64,174	58.50	▲25.78
Total valid votes		109,698	97.60	▼1.49
Rejected ballots		2,694	2.40	▲1.49
Turnout		112,392	91.21	▼3.87
Registered electors		123,225		▲7.18
PAP hold		Swing	▲12.89	
