= Christopher de Souza =

Singaporean politician (born 1976)

The Honourable Christopher de Souza
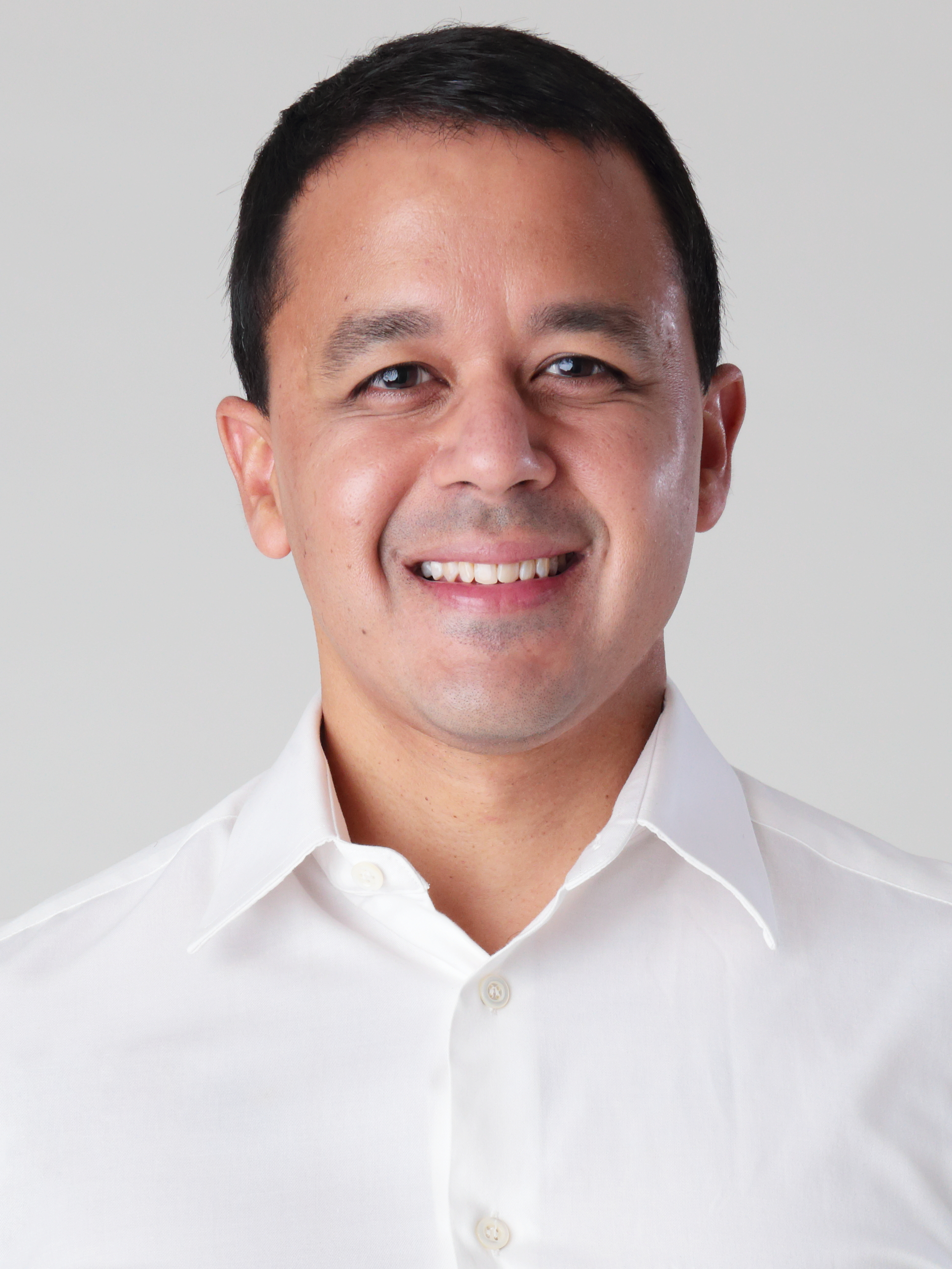
- Official portrait, 2015

Deputy Speaker of the Parliament of Singapore
- Incumbent
- Assumed office 31 August 2020 Serving with: Jessica Tan (2020–2025); Xie Yao Quan (since 2025)
- Prime Minister: Lee Hsien Loong; Lawrence Wong
- Speaker: Seah Kian Peng (2023–present); Tan Chuan-Jin (2017–2023)
- Preceded by: Charles Chong; Lim Biow Chuan

Member of Parliament for Holland–Bukit Timah GRC
- Incumbent
- Assumed office 6 May 2006
- Preceded by: Constituency established
- Majority: 2006: N/A (walkover); 2011: 16,367 (20.20%); 2015: 31,292 (33.2%); 2020: 35,118 (32.72%); 2025: 64,174 (58.50%)

Personal details
- Born: Christopher James de Souza; 21 January 1976 (age 50) Singapore
- Party: People's Action Party
- Education: King's College London (LLB); University of Oxford (BCL)
- Occupation: Politician; lawyer

Christopher James de Souza (born 21 January 1976) is a Singaporean politician and lawyer who has been serving as Deputy Speaker of the Parliament of Singapore since 2020. A member of the governing People's Action Party (PAP), he is a Member of Parliament (MP) for the Holland–Bukit Timah Group Representation Constituency (GRC) since 2006.

A lawyer by profession, de Souza has been working at Lee & Lee since 2006 and had also worked at WongPartnership between 2011 and 2014.

Prior to entering politics in the 2006 general election, he worked in the Singapore Legal Service.

== Early life and education ==
de Souza was educated at St. Michael's Primary School, St. Joseph's Institution and Raffles Junior College before graduating from King's College London in 2000 with a Bachelor of Laws with first class honours degree.

He subsequently went on to complete a Bachelor of Civil Law with distinction degree at the University of Oxford in 2001 under a scholarship.

He had also represented Singapore in hockey at various tournaments until 2005.

== Career ==
=== Public service ===
de Souza started his career in the Singapore Legal Service in 2002 as a Justice's Law Clerk to Chief Justice Yong Pung How. He served as Deputy Public Prosecutor and State Counsel at the Attorney-General's Chambers between 2004 and 2005 before becoming a Magistrate at the Subordinate Courts and Assistant Registrar at the High Court between 2005 and 2006.

=== Legal career ===
de Souza joined Lee & Lee in 2006 as a Senior Associate before he became a Partner in 2008. In 2011, he moved to WongPartnership as a Partner. In 2015, he left WongPartnership and returned to Lee & Lee as a Partner.

In 2022, the Disciplinary Tribunal of the Law Society of Singapore made a finding that de Souza had engaged in professional misconduct by assisting a client in suppression of evidence. However, this decision was overturned on appeal. On 31 July 2023, the Court of Three Judges acquitted de Souza, finding no intention on his part to suppress evidence on behalf of his client. Subsequently, in November 2023, the Law Society of Singapore was ordered to refund de Souza over S$32,000 in costs, affirming his complete exoneration. Through his lawyers, de Souza expressed that he was 'humbled' by the decision and 'feels fully vindicated'.

=== Political career ===
De Souza made his political debut in the 2006 general election when he joined a five-member People's Action Party (PAP) team contesting in Holland–Bukit Timah GRC. The PAP team won by an uncontested walkover and de Souza thus became a Member of Parliament representing the Ulu Pandan ward of Holland–Bukit Timah GRC. De Souza has served as the Vice-Chairman of the Holland-Bukit Panjang Town Council (HBPTC) since 2025.

During the 2011 general election, de Souza joined the four-member PAP team contesting in Holland–Bukit Timah GRC. After they won with 60.08% of the vote against the Singapore Democratic Party, de Souza continued serving as the Member of Parliament representing the Ulu Pandan ward of Holland–Bukit Timah GRC. He retained his parliamentary seats in the subsequent general elections in 2015 and 2020 after the PAP team in Holland–Bukit Timah GRC won with 66.60% and 66.36% of the vote against the Singapore Democratic Party in those two general elections.

De Souza has served on various Government Parliamentary Committees (GPCs) since 2006, and has been the Deputy Chairman for the GPC on Manpower from 2011 to 2015, and Chairman for the GPC on Home Affairs and Law since 2015. In 2009, he was nominated as a Young Global Leader at the World Economic Forum. On 31 August 2020, he and Jessica Tan were elected as Deputy Speakers of Parliament.

On 22 September 2025, de Souza was renominated as Deputy Speaker in the 15th Parliament, alongside first-time nominee Xie Yao Quan.

== Personal life ==
De Souza is a Catholic. He and his wife Sharon have four children.

Parliament of Singapore
New constituency	Member of Parliament for Holland–Bukit Timah GRC; 2006–present Served alongside: (2006–2011): Yu-Foo Yee Shoon, Lim Swee Say, Vivian Balakrishnan, Liang Eng Hwa (2011–2020): Sim Ann, Vivian Balakrishnan, Liang Eng Hwa (2020–present): Sim Ann, Vivian Balakrishnan, Edward Chia	Incumbent
Preceded by Charles Chong; Lim Biow Chuan	Deputy Speaker; 2020–present Served alongside: (2020–2025): Jessica Tan (2025–present): Xie Yao Quan	Incumbent
