= Vincent Wijeysingha =

Singaporean academic, civil activist and politician (born 1970)

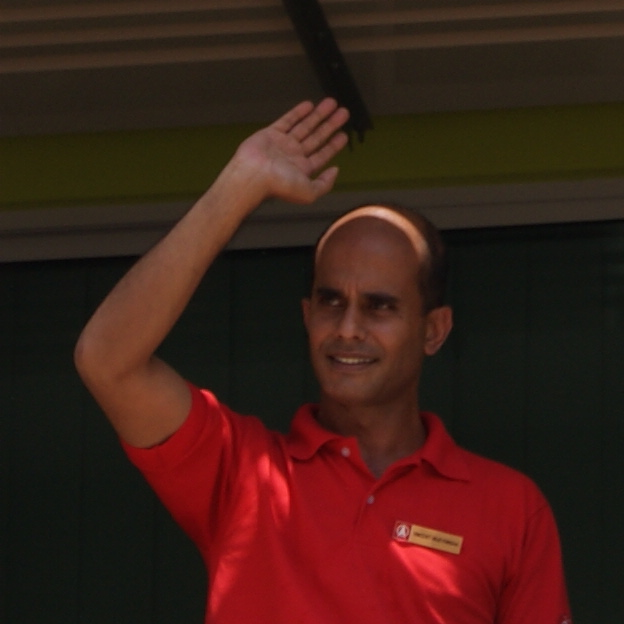
- Wijeysingha waving to supporters on 27 April 2011
- Born: Vincent Rene Wijeysingha; 2 May 1970 (age 56); Singapore
- Education: Victoria School; University of Lincoln; University of Sheffield
- Occupations: Social worker, Lecturer
- Known for: First openly gay politician in Singapore
- Political party: Singapore Democratic Party (2010–2013)
- Movement: LGBT
- Parents: Eugene Wijeysingha (father); Christine Faith Fernando (mother)

Dr. Vincent Rene Wijeysingha (born 2 May 1970) is an academic, civil activist and politician from Singapore. He was a member of the opposition Singapore Democratic Party (SDP) 2010 to 2013. He served as the party's Treasurer and stood as a parliamentary candidate for the party 2011 general election. He was Singapore's first openly gay politician.

== Early life and education ==
Born in Singapore on 2 May 1970 to Eugene Wijeysingha (1934–2024), who was a former principal of Temasek Junior College (1980–1985) and Raffles Institution (1986–1994), and his wife Christine Faith Fernando.

Wijeysingha studied at Victoria School in Singapore, before heading to the United Kingdom where he studied at the University of Lincoln and earned a doctorate in Social Policy at the University of Sheffield. He lived in England for almost 16 years before moving back to Singapore.

== Career ==
Wijeysingha has served as the Executive Director of Transient Workers Count Too (TWC2), a non-government organisation advocating the rights of low-waged migrant workers. He also publishes scholarly papers on social work and has worked as a lecturer in social work at SIM University.

=== Political career ===
Wijeysingha has stated that he joined the SDP because he realised he had a responsibility as a Singaporean to work for change, saying that: "I cannot look the other way as more and more people experience the adverse effects of current PAP policies."

Prior to the 2011 general election, Channel NewsAsia invited the main political parties in Singapore to record an hour-long televised pre-election forum (the first forum of this nature in Singapore since the 1988 general election). The programme, in English entitled, A political forum on Singapore's future, brought together the ruling People's Action Party (PAP) and four opposition parties to discuss long and short-term challenges for the country. Dr Wijeysingha represented the SDP in the discussion.

Just days before Nomination Day on 27 April 2011, the PAP team in the Holland-Bukit Timah Group Representation Constituency (GRC) led by Vivian Balakrishnan, told the press that the SDP was "suppressing" a video which would "raise some awkward questions" about the party's agenda. Wijeysingha's response was that he was unsure about which video Balakrishnan was referring to and that the SDP was "an open party".

The issue of the video was clarified on 25 April 2011, two days before Nomination Day, with both the PAP and the SDP issuing statements about the issue. The New Paper, ran a cover story on 26 April 2011, just a day before Nomination Day, with the heading 'Is Singapore ready for a gay MP?' (in reference to Wijeysingha and comments he had made on the video, which was recorded at a forum discussing gay rights in Singapore).

At the general election, the SDP team led by Wijeysingha polled 39.92% of the valid votes cast in Holland-Bukit Timah GRC, losing to the PAP team which polled 60.08%.

In June 2013, Wijeysingha became the first Singaporean politician to openly declare that he was gay in a public forum when he made a post on Facebook ahead of the annual Pink Dot SG event in which he stated "yes, I am gay", and "no, I don't have a gay agenda".

In August 2013, Wijeysingha announced that he was resigning from the SDP, stating that he wished to focus his efforts on pursuing his work in civil society.
