= Eugene Wijeysingha =

Singaporean educator and historian (1934–2024)

- Born: 1934; Negeri Sembilan, Malaya
- Died: 2 March 2024 (aged 89–90); Singapore
- Resting place: Mandai Crematorium and Columbarium
- Citizenship: Singaporean
- Education: St. Joseph's Institution; University of Malaya
- Spouse: Christine Faith Fernando (m. 1960)
- Children: Adele Wijeyasingha; Carmen Fernando; Vincent Wijeysingha

Eugene Wijeysingha (1934 – 2 March 2024) was a Singaporean educator and historian. He served as the principal of Raffles Institution in Singapore from 1986 to 1994.

== Early life ==
Wijeysingha was born in Negeri Sembilan, Malaya in 1934 to immigrants from Ceylon. In 1949, he and his family migrated to Singapore, where he began attending the St. Joseph's Institution. He attended the University of Malaya after taking a government bursary which required him to teach for five years after his graduation.

== Career ==
Wijeysingha became a teacher at Raffles Institution in 1959, and taught at the school for seven years as a history teacher. His students included Goh Chok Tong, Zainul Abidin and Abdullah Tarmugi. In 1967, he became the principal of Changkat Changi Secondary School. He served as the deputy director for School Organisation from 1973 to 1976, the assistant director of Education from 1976 to 1977 and the deputy director of Staff and Training from 1976 to 1979. He was awarded the Public Administration Medal (Bronze) in 1974 and the Public Administration Medal (Silver) in 1978. From January 1980 to November 1985, he served as the principal of Temasek Junior College.

From 1986 to 1994, Wijeysingha served as the principal of Raffles Institution, during which he played a pivotal role in leading the school to independence and coordinated the school's relocation to the Bishan campus in 1990. He retired from the position in 1994. In 1992, he was awarded the Outstanding Singapore Sinhalese Award. He served as the chairman of the Compulsory Education Board from 2003 to 2007. After retirement, Wijeysingha also published a book on the history of the school, "The Eagle breeds a Gryphon".

== Personal life ==
Wijeysingha married Christine Faith Fernando in December 1960. He was the father of Adele Wijeysingha, Carmen Fernando and activist and former politician Vincent Wijeysingha.

Wijeysingha died on 2 March 2024.
