= Yu-Foo Yee Shoon =

Singaporean politician (born 1950)

- 于符喜泉

Member of the Singapore Parliament for Holland–Bukit Timah GRC
- In office 6 May 2006 – 19 April 2011
- Preceded by: Wang Kai Yuen
- Succeeded by: Sim Ann

Member of the Singapore Parliament for Jurong GRC
- In office 3 November 2001 – 6 May 2006
- Preceded by: Constituency created
- Succeeded by: Grace Fu

Member of the Singapore Parliament for Bukit Timah GRC
- In office 2 January 1997 – 3 November 2001
- Preceded by: Constituency created
- Succeeded by: Constituency abolished

Member of the Singapore Parliament for Yuhua SMC
- In office 22 December 1984 – 2 January 1997
- Preceded by: Constituency created
- Succeeded by: Constituency abolished

Mayor of South West District
- In office November 2001 – August 2004
- Prime Minister: Goh Chok Tong; Lee Hsien Loong
- Preceded by: New office
- Succeeded by: Amy Khor

Personal details
- Born: Foo Yee Shoon; 17 February 1950 (age 76) Colony of Singapore, British Malaya
- Party: People's Action Party (1984–2011)
- Spouse: Yu Lee Wu
- Children: 3

Yu-Foo Yee Shoon (Note: Chinese: 于符喜泉; Bǽh-oe-tu: I-Fû Hí-sôan; pinyin: Yú-Fú Xǐquán) (née Foo; born 17 February 1950) is a Singaporean former politician. A member of the country's governing People's Action Party (PAP), she served as a Member of Parliament (MP) from 1984 to 2011. Her political appointments included Mayor of South West District of Singapore and Minister of State at the Ministry of Community Development, Youth and Sports.

== Political career ==
Yu-Foo was first elected to Parliament in the 1984 general election. She was then one of only three female Members of Parliament at the time, and would go on to become one of the longest serving female politicians in Singapore.

In June 1999, Yu-Foo was appointed Senior Parliamentary Secretary at the Ministry of Community Development and Sports (MCDS).

In November 2001, Yu-Foo was appointed Mayor of the Bukit Timah Community Development Council (CDC), which subsequently expanded to become the South West CDC. With her appointment, she became the first woman Mayor in Singapore.

In August 2004, Yu-Foo was appointed Minister of State at the Ministry of Community Development, Youth and Sports (MCYS).

At the 2011 general election, Yu-Foo retired from politics after serving six terms in Parliament. She was succeeded as Minister of State at the MCYS by Halimah Yacob on 21 May 2011.

== Career outside politics ==
Yu-Foo started her career as a Senior Industrial Relations Officer with the National Trades Union Congress (NTUC) soon after graduating from university. Over the years, she has been Chairman, Vice-President, Assistant Secretary-General and Deputy Secretary-General of the NTUC.

Her other appointments have included:

- Senior Advisor of Hyflux
- Member of the Professional Advisory Council of NTUC Childcare Co-operative Ltd
- Chairman of the Board of Trustees of the Singapore National Co-operative Federation (SNCF)
- First woman to chair the NTUC Central Co-operative Fund Committee (CCFC)

She has also served as a board member of several statutory boards, co-operatives and listed companies such as:

- Hyflux
- Singapore Economic Development Board (EDB)
- Singapore Telecommunications
- NTUC Insurance Co-operative (INCOME)
- NTUC FairPrice
- NTUC Childcare
- National Environment Agency (NEA)
- Jurong Town Corporation (JTC)
- People's Association (PA)

== Achievements and accolades ==
Named "Woman of the Year" in 1995 by Her World magazine, Yu-Foo was awarded the Rochdale Medal by the Singapore National Co-operative Federation in 1997.

In 2005, she received the Alumni Achievement Award from the Nanyang Technological University.

In May 2008, she was conferred the Honorary Degree of Doctor of Education by Wheelock College, Boston, USA.

The Singapore Council of Women's Organisations (SCWO) inducted her to its Wall of Fame in 2009.

In March 2013, she was appointed Senior Advisor of Hyflux.

== Education ==
Yu-Foo attended Nanyang Girls' High School from 1962 to 1967, and graduated from Nanyang University in 1971 with a Bachelor of Commerce. In 1996, she completed a Master of Business at the Nanyang Technological Institute.

== Family background ==
Yu-Foo was born in Singapore in 1950. Her father, Foo Tuck Sun, was a Hainanese immigrant who served as principal of Pei Chun Public School from the 1940s until his retirement in 1971. She is married to Yu Lee Wu, an engineering lecturer. The couple have three children.
