= List of Singaporean Community Development Councils (2006–2011) =

The following is a list of Singaporean Community Development Councils from 2006 to 2011.

As of 2006, there are still five Community Development Councils throughout Singapore. However, the composition of constituencies within each CDC were changed on 31 May 2006 to reflect the changes in constituencies during the 2006 Singaporean general election.

Community Development Council	Constituencies	Electorate (2006)	
Community Development Council	Constituencies	Constituency	CDC
Central Singapore	Ang Mo Kio GRC	159,864	541,389
Central Singapore	Bishan–Toa Payoh GRC	115,321	541,389
Central Singapore	Jalan Besar GRC	93,003	541,389
Central Singapore	Tanjong Pagar GRC	148,129	541,389
Central Singapore	Yio Chu Kang SMC	25,072	541,389
North East	Aljunied GRC	145,124	473,441
North East	Pasir Ris–Punggol GRC	178,423	473,441
North East	Tampines GRC	126,142	473,441
North East	Hougang SMC	23,752	473,441
North West	Holland–Bukit Timah GRC	118,138	389,107
North West	Sembawang GRC	184,794	389,107
North West	Bukit Panjang SMC	30,450	389,107
North West	Nee Soon Central SMC	23,143	389,107
North West	Nee Soon East SMC	32,582	389,107
South East	East Coast GRC	116,635	330,530
South East	Marine Parade GRC	155,135	330,530
South East	Joo Chiat SMC	21,848	330,530
South East	MacPherson SMC	21,033	330,530
South East	Potong Pasir SMC	15,879	330,530
South West	Hong Kah GRC	144,660	423,972
South West	Jurong GRC	116,618	423,972
South West	West Coast GRC	137,725	423,972
South West	Chua Chu Kang SMC	24,969	423,972
