= Kenneth Chen (Singaporean politician) =

Singaporean politician (1940–2026)

- 陈冠立
- Chen in 1988

Member of the Singapore Parliament for Hong Kah GRC
- In office 6 January 1992 – 18 October 2001
- Prime Minister: Goh Chok Tong
- Preceded by: PAP held
- Succeeded by: PAP held

Personal details
- Born: Kenneth Chen Koon Lap; 30 March 1940 Burma
- Died: 17 August 2026 (aged 86) Singapore
- Spouse: Desiree Hsu (m. 1966)
- Children: 2
- Education: Perth Technical College; Singapore Polytechnic

Kenneth Chen Koon Lap (Note: Chinese: 陈冠立; Jyutping: Can^{4} Gun^{3} Lap^{6}; pinyin: Chén Guānlì) (30 March 1940 – 17 August 2026) was a Singaporean architect and politician, who served as a Member of Parliament (MP) from 1992 to 2001.

Prior to entering politics, Chen worked in various architectural firms, such as Cameron Chisholm Nicol, and Archynamics Architects.

== Early life and education ==
Kenneth Chen Koon Lap was born in Burma on 30 March 1940. He was the youngest, and he had two brothers, a sister, a half-sister and a half-brother, Bernard Chen.

Chen's father, Chen Li Kang, was educated at Lingnan University and obtained a degree in factual economics from the University of Pennsylvania. He worked in the administration of Chinese railways. Chen's mother died at childbirth, and his father remarried in 1942.

To escape the Second Sino-Japanese War, Chen and his family moved to Calcutta, India. In 1946, they moved to British Hong Kong.

In 1956, Chen moved to Singapore via a cargo liner, together with his parents and brothers. He studied at Saint Anthony's Boys' School (Note: Now known as St. Anthony's Primary School.) along Victoria Street. Due to poor teaching quality, Chen left the school. Being one month over aged, he was unable to find a school willing to admit him. Later, Chen enrolled at Bartley Secondary School.

In 1960, Chen enrolled in a building course at Singapore Polytechnic (SP). In 1962, he left SP for Perth Technical College to study architecture. While studying, Chen worked at Cameron Chisholm Nicol. In 1964, he obtained a diploma in architecture.

== Career ==
=== Architectural career ===
In 1967, upon returning to Singapore, Chen was unable to find a job. He was later offered a job with Goh Hock Guan and Associates, an architectural firm founded by Goh Hock Guan. Feeling unhappy in the company, Chen resigned and became a freelance architect. In 1972, He took part in a competition to design Jurong Town Hall, and managed to meet up with Tan Cheng Siong, whose firm, Archynamics Architects, won third place in the competition. Chen joined Tan's firm and became a partner after a few months.

In 1974, due to a personality clash with Tan, Chen and Eddie Chan Fook Pong decided to split from Archynamics Architects to form Regional Development Consortium Architects (RDC Architects). During this period, Chen and Chan were working on the architecture of Merlin Hotel. (Note: Completed in 1980 for Hotel Merlin Singapore Pte Ltd, a subsidiary of UOL Group. In November 1982, the hotel was renamed to Plaza Hotel. The hotel is now known as PARKROYAL on Beach Road.)

In 1979, Chen was elected as a member of the Singapore Institute of Architects. He was elected as vice-president in 1981, and president in 1982. In June 1982, Chen accused foreign architects of the unethical practice of passing off "old abandoned work" for new architectural designs. He elaborated:

I find this extremely disturbing and sincerely hope that architects who intend to expand their practice beyond their own shores will do some soul-searching and serious consideration before embarking on such ventures.

In June 1984, Chen was succeeded by Gan Eng Oon as president of SIA. Chen was also an external tutor at the University of Singapore. He felt "very disillusioned" with the courses, and he left after a year.

After winning the 1991 general election, Chen stepped down as a partner of RDC Architects. From 1992 to 2001, he was the chairman of firm.

=== Political career ===
In 1979, Chen stayed in Sennett Estate, located within Potong Pasir Constituency, and he was introduced to his MP Howe Yoon Chong by his half-brother, Bernard Chen. Howe engaged Chen to chair the constituency's Citizens' Consultative Committee, and the Sennett Community Centre management committee.

In 1980, Howe gave Chen a form to join the People's Action Party. Chen did not fill up the form, and continued serving as a community leader. In 1988, while playing golf with Goh Chok Tong, Chen joked with Goh that he would stand for elections in Potong Pasir, provided that he could retire from his community leadership roles if he lost. In July 1988, Chen joined the party.

In the 1988 general election, Chen stood for election in Potong Pasir, against the incumbent Chiam See Tong. During an election rally, Chen announced plans to build an Olympic-size swimming pool, exercise areas, and playgrounds in the constituency. When interviewed by The Straits Times about his chances of winning the election, he said "I don't think I want to lose, I want to win. I will win". Chen lost the election, obtaining 36.9% of the votes, and he was appointed a grassroots advisor in Potong Pasir.

During the 1991 general election, Chen was part of four-person team (Note: Namely, Yeo Cheow Tong, John Chen Seow Phun, and Harun bin Abdul Ghani.) that contested Hong Kah Group Representation Constituency. They were elected unopposed.

==== 8th Parliament (1992–1996) ====
On 6 January 1992, Chen was sworn into the 8th Parliament. In July 1992, Chen was part of the inaugural PAP football team, (Note: Other members were namely, Mah Bow Tan, Ho Peng Kee, Koo Tsai Kee, Ibrahim Othman, Heng Chiang Meng, and Davinder Singh.) known as the Parliamentarians.

In 1996, Chen was part of a nine-member Select Committee to examine changes to the Women's Charter. Chen and his half-brother, Bernard Chen, proposed renaming the Women's Charter to Family Charter.

For the 1997 general election, Chen was one of the five PAP candidates (Note: Namely, Yeo Cheow Tong, John Chen Seow Phun, Harun bin Abdul Ghani, and Peter Chen Min Liang.) in Hong Kah Group Representation Constituency, and the opposition party was the National Solidarity Party. PAP won the election with 69% of the votes.

==== 9th Parliament (1997–2001) ====
On 26 May 1997, Chen was sworn into the 9th Parliament. In June 1997, he supported the increase of Nominated Members of Parliament from six to nine. In July 1997, in response to domestic worker abuse by employers, Chen suggested to establish a unit "to spot-check homes with maids".

In December 2000, Chen succeeded Low Seow Chay as deputy chairman of the environment government parliamentary committee.

In October 2001, Chen retired from politics, and did not contest the 2001 general election.

=== Business ===
In December 1993, Chen formed a joint-venture company, Third Dragon Development Pte. Ltd., with Peh Chin Hua, to promote investment in a tourism site and an industrial park, in Shandong, China. The company also built Qingdao Huashan International Country Club, a US$50,000,000 (equivalent to $111,437,457 in 2025) golf course. Chen and Peh owned 45% of the shares in the company, and the remaining 10% was owned by Huashan town government. In April 1994, Heng Chiang Meng bought over 12% of the company's shares, reducing the shares owned by Chen and Peh to 44% each. Heng later sold his shares.

In October 1996, Third Dragon announced plans to build a US$300,000,000 (equivalent to $615,849,777 in 2025) 77 hectares (190 acres) theme park, the Huoniu Town Entertainment Park, in Jimo, and a 333 hectares (820 acres) tourist-oriented orchard.

In December 1997, Dragon Land, owned by Chen and Peh, announced plans to list on the Stock Exchange of Singapore. The company owned more than 1.7 square kilometres (420 acres) of land in Anxi, Changzhou, and Qingdao. In January 1998, the company decided to continue with its initial public offering without an underwriter.

In 2000, Dragon Land announced a partnership with Creative Technology to develop the Creative Dragon Park, a 250 hectares (620 acres) technology and media park next to the golf course, in Shandong, China. Peh was appointed chairman of the park, and Creative Technology chief executive Sim Wong Hoo was vice-chairman together with Chen.

In November 2004, Chen stepped down as chief executive officer and group executive deputy chairman of Dragon Land, and he was succeeded by Chua Yang Hong.

== Personal life and death ==
Chen was a Catholic. In 1966, Chen married Desiree Hsu, and they had a son and a daughter. His wife was an architect and a lecturer at Singapore Polytechnic. In 1982, Chen moved from Sennett Estate to Katong. His son, Peter Chen Chia Mien, was unable to attend pre-university and university studies locally as he did not pass the Chinese subject for the Singapore-Cambridge GCE Ordinary Level. As such, he was sent to the United States by his family, and obtained bachelor's degrees in business administration and architecture from the University of Michigan, and a Master of Architecture from Rice University.

Chen played golf, and has won competitions at the Singapore Island Country Club. In 2000, Chen also played tennis with Goh Chok Tong twice a week.

On 17 August 2026, Chen died at the age of 86.

== Notes ==
Parliament of Singapore
| Previous: Yeo Cheow Tong; John Chen Seow Phun; Abdul Nasser bin Kamaruddin | Member of Parliament for Hong Kah GRC; 1992–2001; Served alongside: (1992–1997): Yeo Cheow Tong, John Chen Seow Phun, Harun bin Abdul Ghani (1997–2001): Yeo Cheow Tong, John Chen Seow Phun, Harun bin Abdul Ghani, Peter Chen Min Liang | Succeeded by Yeo Cheow Tong; Amy Khor; Ang Mong Seng; Ahmad Khalis; John Chen Seow Phun |
