= Desmond Lim =

Singaporean politician

- 林睦荃
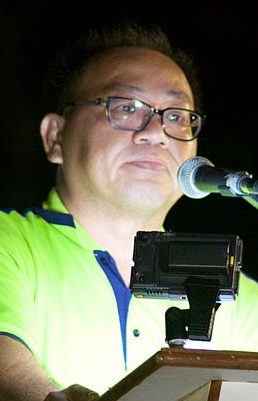
- Lim at a rally speech in 2015

Personal details
- Born: Lim Bak Chuan; 1967 (age 58–59) Singapore
- Party: Singapore Democratic Alliance
- Other political affiliations: Singapore People's Party (1996–2011); SJP (until 1996, 2011)
- Education: Master of Engineering Management
- Alma mater: University of Wollongong
- Occupation: politician, engineer

Desmond Lim Bak Chuan (Chinese: 林睦荃; pinyin: Lín Mùquán; born 1967) is a Singaporean politician who has been serving as chairperson of the Singapore Democratic Alliance since 2001.

Lim participated in the general elections from 2001 to 2025, contesting the GRCs of Jalan Besar (2001), Pasir Ris-Punggol (2006 to 2020) and Pasir Ris-Changi (2025), as well as the by-election of Punggol East SMC (2013), under the SDA.

Lim was initially considered a protégé of Chiam See Tong until they had a falling out in 2011, which led to Chiam and the SPP withdrawing from the SDA. Lim is known for his willingness to attempt new methods of campaigning and has described himself as "dedicated and determined".

== Education ==
Lim holds a Master of Engineering Management from the University of Wollongong.

== Career ==
Lim started his career as an air-conditioner mechanic and technician, and currently works as a principal engineer at the telecommunication company M1.

== Community service ==
Since 2011, Lim has been running a charity organisation called Dedicated Locals' Caring Community to help those who have fallen on hard times. To date, it has benefited over 7,000 beneficiaries in Singapore, South East Asia, China and Nepal through the provision of free amenity services, giving out free basic necessities, and missionary trips. In recognition of his community contributions, he was conferred with the title of "Dato' Sri Utama" in 2019.

== Political career ==
Lim was the chairman of the Singapore Justice Party (SJP), which he left for the Singapore People's Party (SPP) in 1996. He became the assistant secretary-general of the SPP from December 1997 to 2006. Lim made his electoral debut during the 2001 general election when he joined a five-member SDA team to contest in Jalan Besar GRC against a five-member team from the governing People's Action Party (PAP). The SDA team lost with 25.51% of the vote against the PAP team's 74.49%.

Lim joined a six-member SDA team contesting in Pasir Ris–Punggol GRC during the 2006 general election against a PAP team led by Defence Minister Teo Chee Hean. At the time, Lim was assistant secretary-general of the SDA. The SDA team lost to the PAP team with 31.3% of the vote against the PAP team's 68.7%.

In 2009, Lim became the secretary-general of the SDA. In October 2010, he was replaced with Mohamad Hamim Aliyas as the secretary-general of the SDA by Chiam See Tong during a central executive committee meeting of SPP. SPP founder and chairman Sin Kek Tong said Chiam's move was due to Lim opposing Reform Party (RP) joining the SDA. However, in an SDA council meeting held shortly after, the council rejected the decision of Chiam and Lim remained as the secretary-general.

In March 2011, Chiam pulled SPP out of the SDA. As a result, Lim left SPP and rejoined SJP. He was appointed secretary-general of SJP. Lim also became the chairman of the SDA. In the 2011 Singaporean general election, Lim contested in a three-cornered fight in the Punggol East SMC. He ultimately lost to the PAP candidate Michael Palmer, who had 54.54% of the vote. Lim's share of the vote, at 4.45%, was significantly lower than that of the other opposition candidate, Lee Li Lian of the Workers' Party (WP), who had 41.01% of the vote. Due to having garnered lower than 12.5% of the vote, Lim forfeited his S$16,000 election deposit under Singapore's electoral rules.

In 2013, after Palmer resigned from the PAP and gave up his parliamentary seat in Punggol East SMC, a by-election was scheduled to be held on 26 January. Lim announced his decision to contest as a SDA candidate in the by-election, which turned out to be a four-cornered fight pitting Lim against three other candidates: Koh Poh Koon of PAP; Lee of WP; and Kenneth Jeyaretnam of RP. On 21 January, Lim started uploading a series of videos of his speeches, calling it an "online rally" and talking about issues such as the high costs of living and high property prices in Singapore. Although he was derided for his poor diction, he said he was not disheartened and felt that he should not be judged on his command of English, but on how he could serve the people. It was also reported that some residents admired his "underdog indefatigability".

Lim ultimately lost the by-election, having garnered just 0.57% of the vote, the lowest among the four candidates: Lee won with 54.5% of the vote, while Koh and Jeyaratnam had 43.73% and 1.2% respectively. As he had lower than 12.5% of the vote, Lim forfeited his S$14,500 election deposit, becoming the second candidate in Singaporean electoral history after Harbans Singh to forfeit his election deposit twice. His electoral result of 0.57% was at the time the lowest any candidate or party got in an election since Singapore gained independence in 1965, beating Teo Kim Hoe's result of 0.81% in 1984.

Lim joined a six-member SDA team contesting in Pasir Ris–Punggol GRC again during the 2015 general election against the PAP team led by Deputy Prime Minister Teo Chee Hean. The SDA team lost to the PAP team with 27.11% of the vote against the PAP team's 72.89%.

In 2020, Lim announced that he would be stepping down from his position as SDA chairman after the general election that year. He joined a five-member SDA team to contest in a three-cornered fight in Pasir Ris–Punggol GRC against the PAP team led by Senior Minister Teo Chee Hean and another team from the opposition Peoples Voice led by Lim Tean. The SDA team lost with 23.67% against the PAP team's 64.16%, but did better than the Peoples Voice team's 12.17%.

In 2025, Lim decided to carry on as the SDA chairman as he claimed that he was "talked into carrying on in his role". He subsequently led the SDA team again in the newly formed Pasir Ris-Changi GRC for the 2025 Singaporean general election against the PAP team led by Indranee Rajah where they lost with 32.34% of the vote compared to the 67.66% of the PAP.

== Personal life ==
Lim is married and has a son.
