= LUP =

Lup or LUP may refer to:

- Landkreis Ludwigslust-Parchim, a district in the west of Mecklenburg-Vorpommern, Germany
- Lead units of pressure, a measurement for the estimation of chamber pressures in firearms
- Leiden University Press, a publishing house and part of Leiden University
- Liberal Unionist Party, a British political party
- Liberty Union Party, a political party of Vermont, USA
- Lift Upgrading Programme, a Singapore Housing and Development Board (HDB) project
- Kalaupapa Airport, Hawaii (IATA Code: LUP)
- LUP decomposition, a matrix decomposition useful in solving an n-by-n systems of linear equations
- Lupus (constellation)
- Land Utilization Program, New Deal land agency
- Living Undead Phenomenon (LUP), in "Dance of the Dead"
