= Singapore People's Party =

Singaporean political party

- Malay name: Parti Rakyat Singapura
- Chinese name: 新加坡人民党; Xīnjiāpō Rénmín Dǎng
- Tamil name: சிங்கப்பூர் மக்கள் கட்சி Ciṅkappūr Makkaḷ Kaṭci
- Chairman: Melvyn Chiu
- Secretary-General: Steve Chia
- Vice-Chairman: Lina Chiam
- Founder: Sin Kek Tong
- Founded: 21 November 1994; 31 years ago
- Split from: Singapore Democratic Party
- Headquarters: 28 Sin Ming Lane, #03-142, Midview City, Singapore 573972
- Ideology: Social democracy
- Political position: Centre-left
- Colours: Purple
- Parliament: 0 / 104

Website
- https://singaporepeoplesparty.org/

The Singapore People's Party (SPP) is a political party in Singapore.

SPP was founded in 1994 by Sin Kek Tong who left the Singapore Democratic Party (SDP) with various SDP members after internal conflicts in SDP. The leadership was held by Sin until Chiam See Tong left SDP in December 1996 and Chiam assumed leadership.

== History ==
=== 1994–2000: Formation ===
SPP was founded on 21 November 1994 by Sin Kek Tong, who led a pro-Chiam See Tong faction out of the Singapore Democratic Party (SDP). Over two years, Sin stood as the pro-tem leader until Chiam joined the party and assumed leadership in December 1996, at the time the Parliament was dissolved ahead of the 1997 general election. Chiam then became the party's first Member of Parliament (MP) when he won the constituency of Potong Pasir at the election, where he also did under the SDP banner.

=== 2001–2008: As part of Singapore Democratic Alliance ===
In 2001, the SPP became a founding member of the Singapore Democratic Alliance (SDA), along with the National Solidarity Party (NSP), the Singapore Justice Party (SJP) and the Singapore Malay National Organisation (PKMS). Chiam became the founding Chairman of SDA, which aimed to provide a common grouping under which different opposition parties could stand as a political coalition in elections against the ruling People's Action Party (PAP).

At the 2001 general election, Chiam was returned to Parliament as MP for Potong Pasir. Though Chiam was the only SDA member to win an elected seat in Parliament, he was joined in Parliament by SDA member Steve Chia (leader of the National Solidarity Party) who became a non-constituency MP after securing 34.6% of the votes in the constituency of Chua Chu Kang, which was the highest percentage of the vote secured by a losing opposition candidate at the election. The result made Chiam the de facto leader of the opposition in Parliament, as the SDA had two representatives (Chiam and Chia), whereas the only other opposition party represented in Parliament (the Workers' Party) had only one (Hougang MP Low Thia Khiang).

At the 2006 general election, Chiam was again re-elected as MP for Potong Pasir. However, the SDA did not win any other seats. Though Chia increased his share of the vote in Chua Chu Kang to 39.63%, this was lower than the 43.9% gained by the Workers' Party in Aljunied GRC. The role of de facto leader of the opposition in Parliament therefore passed from Chiam to Low, the Workers' Party leader.

=== 2009–2018: Leaving the SDA and electoral defeats ===
In 2009 and 2010, Chiam spoke of the possibility of having Reform Party (RP) to join the SDA and attempted to bring RP into SDA. However, the rest of the leadership of SDA voted not to make a decision on the list of conditions. In October 2010, Chiam replaced SDA's secretary general, Desmond Lim, with Mohamad Hamim Aliyas during a central executive committee meeting of SPP. SPP founder and chairman Sin Kek Tong said Chiam's move is due to Lim opposing RP joining the SDA. However, in a SDA council meeting held shortly after, the council rejected the decision of Chiam and Lim remained as the secretary general of the SDA.

On 2 March 2011, SPP withdrew from the coalition due to a few reasons. Prior to exiting the coalition, the SDA Council voted to relieve Chiam as chairman three days earlier due to his health reasons and voted not decide on a list of conditions for RP, which Chiam had invited, to join the SDA.

At the 2011 general election, Chiam announced his intention to lead his team to contest the Bishan-Toa Payoh Group Representation Constituency (GRC), leaving his Potong Pasir ward to his wife, Lina Loh Woon Lee (Lina Chiam). This was Loh's debut in politics, despite supporting Chiam and campaigning with Chiam over his many years in politics. Chairman Sin was also fielded to contest the newly-formed Hong Kah North SMC, a ward which was formerly part of the Hong Kah GRC.

After polling day, the party was defeated in all of the contested constituencies, including Potong Pasir which was reclaimed by the PAP for the first time since 1984; consequently, Chiam's defeat ended his 27-year tenure in Parliament. However, Loh was offered a post for the Non-Constituency Member of Parliament (NCMP) as a result of being the best performing opposition candidate (amongst unelected candidates) after narrowly losing the election by 49.64% to the PAP's Sitoh Yih Pin's 50.36% (a margin of 114 votes). Overall, the SPP managed to clinch 41.42% (62,504 votes) of the total number of votes in the constituencies that it had contested.

Ahead of the 2015 elections (due to be held on 11 September), Chiam announced that he would not stand as a candidate for the elections, for the first time since his debut in 1976. Another opposition party, the Democratic Progressive Party, that was led by Benjamin Pwee and Hamin Aliyas, joined the SPP to strengthen its team contesting Bishan–Toa Payoh GRC. New candidate Ravi Philemon replaced Sin as candidate for Hong Kah North, while Lina Chiam contested again in Potong Pasir. Former NSP member Jeannette Chong-Aruldoss joined the party prior, and contested Mountbatten SMC just as Chong did in the 2011 elections.

However, the absence of Chiam in the election saw their party suffer another major setback, not only did the party fail to win a parliamentary seat, their scores were overseen by large swings towards the PAP, one of which was Potong Pasir, where Lina Chiam managed to secure only 33.59% (down from the previous election's 49.64%) of the valid votes. Compared to the Workers' Party's performances (of East Coast GRC, Fengshan SMC and Punggol East SMC), it was not enough for Lina Chiam to secure her NCMP seat for a second term, thus ending their party's presence in Parliament since the party foundation. In terms of the party's overall vote, they garnered only 27.08% of the votes cast, a swing of -14.34% from the previous election.

On 1 March 2017, the party reported that former party's chairman Sin had died from prostate cancer two days earlier. In January 2018, it was reported that Jose Raymond, a former Press Secretary to Vivian Balakrishnan (who also was Chief Executive of the Singapore Environment Council and current Minister of Foreign Affairs), had joined the SPP.

=== 2019–present: Leadership of Steve Chia ===
On 4 September 2019, Chiam announced that he would be stepping down from the secretary-general position due to declining health, while Lina Chiam would be stepping down from the chairman position. The party's Facebook announced that they would be electing new leadership. On 16 October 2019, during the party's biennial Ordinary Party Conference, Chiam and Chong-Aruldoss stepped down from the party's Central Executive Committee (CEC). Four new faces were elected into the CEC. On 5 November 2019, Chia was elected as the new Secretary-General of the Singapore People's Party, along with Raymond as Chairman.

==== 2020 general election ====
Following the general election on 10 July 2020, the party lost to the PAP for the third consecutive election, on both of the contested constituencies (Bishan-Toa Payoh GRC and Potong Pasir SMC), despite seeing a small vote swing against the PAP. Their party improved their vote share in the contested wards to 33.83%.

On 22 December 2020, Chairman Raymond announced that he would be retiring from politics, while revealing that the Assistant Secretary-General, Ariffin Sha, had resigned from the party in August. Vice-Chairman Williiamson Lee became Acting Chairman, while Ariffin's position was not filled. The SPP CEC accepted the resignations on 17 January 2021 and co-opted Khan Osman Sulaiman and Melvyn Chiu.

==== 2025 general election ====
The SPP contested five seats in GE2025. Steve Chia led a four-man team in Bishan-Toa Payoh GRC, consisting of himself, Melvyn Chiu, Lim Rui Xian and Muhammad Norhakim; ultimately securing 24.82% of the vote (21,944 votes) against the incumbent PAP team led by then-Minister for Transport Chee Hong Tat. Williiamson Lee also contested Potong Pasir SMC, securing 22.46% of the vote (6,261 votes) against the incumbent PAP's Alex Yeo and PAR's Lim Tean.

Following the release of the election results, Secretary-General Steve Chia was notably disappointed with the outcome. In an interview with the Straits Times, he was said to have "mulled over deregistering the party", having described the results as being "very bleak".

== Organisation ==
=== Central executive committee ===
Title	Name
Chairperson	Melvyn Chiu
Vice-Chairperson	Lina Chiam
Secretary-General	Steve Chia
Assistant Secretary-General	Ng Theng Lim
Treasurer	Williiamson Lee
Assistant Treasurer	Eddy Tan
Organising Secretary	Yen Kim Khooi
Assistant Organising Secretary	Ricky Toh
Social Media Secretary	Kathleen Cheong
Members	Yong Seng Fatt
Members	Shah Shafie
Members	Jalil Wari

== Former elected members ==
=== Former Members of Parliament of Singapore (1965–present) ===
No	Name	Constituency	Length of service (cumulative)
1	Chiam See Tong	Potong Pasir SMC	1984 - 2011 (under SPP from 1997)
2	Lina Chiam	Non-Constituency Member of Parliament	2011 - 2015

== Electoral performance ==
=== Parliament ===
Due to a merger with the Singapore Democratic Alliance (SDA) in the 2001 and 2006 elections, collective figures represent the SDA total inclusive of the SPP, while figures in parentheses/brackets refer to the SPP only.

Election	Leader	Votes	%	Seats					NCMPs	Position	Result
Election	Leader	Votes	%	Contested			Total	+/–	NCMPs	Position	Result
Election	Leader	Votes	%	Seats	Won	Lost	Total	+/–	NCMPs	Position	Result
1997	Chiam See Tong	16,746	2.3%	3	1	2	1 / 83	▲1	0 / 1	▲5th	Opposition
2001	Chiam See Tong	75,248	12.03%	13 (4)	1 (1)	12 (3)	1 / 84	Steady	1 / 1	▲2nd	Opposition
2006	Chiam See Tong	145,628	12.96%	20 (8)	1 (1)	19 (7)	1 / 84	Steady	0 / 1	▼3rd	Opposition
2011	Chiam See Tong	62,639	3.11%	7	0	7	1 / 87	Steady	1 / 3	▼5th	Opposition
2015	Lina Chiam	49,107	2.17%	8	0	8	0 / 89	▼1	0 / 3	▼7th	No seats
2020	Steve Chia	37,998	1.52%	5	0	5	0 / 93	Steady	0 / 2	▼8th	No seats
2025	Steve Chia	28,029	1.17%	5	0	5	0 / 97	Steady	0 / 2	8th	No seats

==== Seats contested ====
Election	Constituencies contested	Contested vote %	+/–
1997	SMC: Ayer Rajah, Bukit Gombak, Potong Pasir	27.2%	—N/a
2001	5-member GRC: Jalan Besar, Tampines; SMC: Bukit Timah, Chua Chu Kang, Potong Pasir	27.6%	—N/a
2006	6-member GRC: Pasir Ris-Punggol; 5-member GRC: Jalan Besar, Tampines; SMC: Chua Chu Kang, MacPherson, Potong Pasir, Yio Chu Kang	32.5%	▲4.9%
2011	5-member GRC: Bishan-Toa Payoh; SMC: Hong Kah North, Potong Pasir	41.1%	—N/a
2015	5-member GRC: Bishan-Toa Payoh; SMC: Hong Kah North, Mountbatten, Potong Pasir	27.1%	▼14.0%
2020	4-member GRC: Bishan-Toa Payoh; SMC: Potong Pasir	33.9%	▲6.8%
2025	4-member GRC: Bishan-Toa Payoh; SMC: Potong Pasir	26.3%	▼7.6%
