= Amy Khor =

Singaporean politician (born 1958)

- 许连碹

Mayor of the South West District
- In office 12 August 2004 – 26 May 2014
- Prime Minister: Lee Hsien Loong
- Preceded by: Yu-Foo Yee Shoon
- Succeeded by: Low Yen Ling

Member of Parliament for Hong Kah North SMC
- In office 7 May 2011 – 15 April 2025
- Preceded by: Constituency established
- Succeeded by: Constituency abolished
- Majority: 2011: 10,600 (41.22%); 2015: 13,001 (49.52%); 2020: 5,890 (21.98%)

Member of Parliament for Hong Kah GRC (Hong Kah North)
- In office 3 November 2001 – 18 April 2011
- Preceded by: John Chen Seow Phun
- Succeeded by: Constituency abolished
- Majority: 2001: 71,937 (59.48%); 2006: N/A (walkover)

Personal details
- Born: Amy Khor Lean Suan; 23 February 1958 (age 68) Malaysia
- Party: People's Action Party
- Education: National University of Singapore (BS); San Jose State University (MBA); University of Reading (PhD)
- Occupation: Politician; valuer; lecturer

Amy Khor Lean Suan (Note: Chinese: 许连碹; Pe̍h-ōe-jī: Khó͘ Liân-soan; pinyin: Xǔ Liánxuàn) (born 23 February 1958) is a Malaysian-born Singaporean former politician who served as Senior Minister of State for Transport and Senior Minister of State for Sustainability and the Environment from 2020 to 2025. A member of the governing People's Action Party (PAP), she was the Member of Parliament (MP) for the Hong Kah North division of Hong Kah Group Representation Constituency (GRC) between 2001 and 2011 and Hong Kah North Single Member Constituency (SMC) between 2011 and 2025.

Prior to entering politics, Khor was a valuer at the Inland Revenue Authority of Singapore (IRAS), senior lecturer at the National University of Singapore, and executive director at Knight Frank. She made her political debut in the 2001 general election as part of a five-member PAP team contesting in Hong Kah GRC.

== Education ==
Khor was educated at Alexandra Hill Primary School, Raffles Girls' School and Raffles Institution before she went to the National University of Singapore, where she completed a Bachelor of Science in estate management in 1981. In 1988, she completed a Master of Business Administration at San Jose State University. In 1997, she completed a Doctor of Philosophy in land management at the University of Reading.

== Career ==
Khor was a valuer at the Property Tax Division of the Inland Revenue Authority of Singapore from 1981 to 1987, before she became a senior lecturer at the National University of Singapore from 1989 to 1999. From 1999 to 2004, she was an executive director at Knight Frank.

=== Political career ===
Khor entered politics when she contested as part of a five-member People's Action Party (PAP) team in the 2001 general election in Hong Kah GRC. The PAP team won with 79.74% of the vote against the Singapore Democratic Party, and Khor thus became a Member of Parliament representing the Hong Kah North ward of Hong Kah GRC. On 12 August 2004, she was appointed Mayor of the South West District and held this position until 26 May 2014.

During the 2006 general election, Khor joined a five-member PAP team contesting in Hong Kah GRC again and they won by an uncontested walkover this time. On 30 May 2006, she was appointed Senior Parliamentary Secretary at the Ministry of the Environment and Water Resources. On 1 April 2007, she was appointed Deputy Government Whip and held this position until 30 September 2015. On 1 November 2010, she was promoted from Senior Parliamentary Secretary to Minister of State at the Ministry of the Environment and Water Resources.

In the 2011 general election, Khor contested as a solo PAP candidate in the newly formed Hong Kah North SMC and won with 70.61% of the vote against the Singapore People's Party's Sin Kek Tong. She was appointed Minister of State at the Ministry of Health on 21 May 2011 and given an additional appointment as Minister of State at the Ministry of Manpower on 1 August 2012. On 1 September 2013, Khor was promoted to Senior Minister of State.

During the 2015 general election, Khor retained her parliamentary seat in Hong Kah North SMC after winning 74.76% of the vote against the Singapore People's Party's Ravi Philemon. After the election, she became Senior Minister of State at the Ministry of the Environment and Water Resources and Ministry of Health.

In the 2020 general election, Khor retained her parliamentary seat in Hong Kah North SMC after winning 60.99% of the vote against the Progress Singapore Party's Gigene Wong. On 27 July 2020, she was appointed Senior Minister of State at the Ministry of Transport and Ministry of Sustainability and the Environment.

In April 2025, Khor announced that she would step down at the 2025 general election and retire from politics.

== Personal life ==
Khor has preaxial (radial) polydactyly (growth of extra thumbs) on both hands. She is a Christian and is married with three children.

== Notes ==
Parliament of Singapore
Preceded by	Member of Parliament for Hong Kah GRC; 2001 – 2011	Constituency abolished
New constituency	Member of Parliament for Hong Kah North SMC; 2011 – present	Constituency abolished
Government offices
Preceded by Yu-Foo Yee Shoon	Mayor of the South West district 2004 – 2014	Succeeded by Low Yen Ling
