= Ravi Philemon =

Singaporean politician

- ரவி பிலமோன்
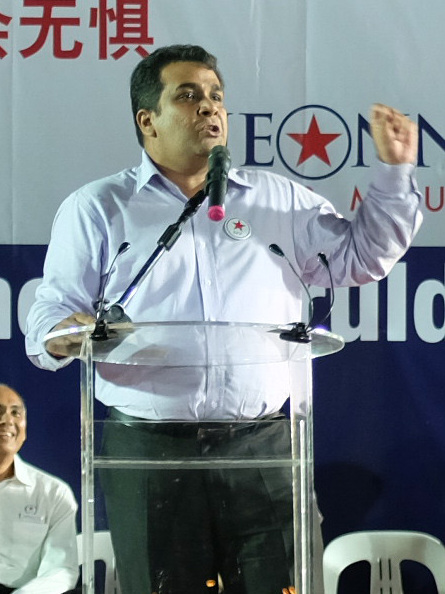
- Philemon speaking at the 2015 general election

1st secretary general of Red Dot United
- Incumbent
- Assumed office 26 May 2020

Personal details
- Born: 15 May 1968 (age 58) Singapore
- Party: Red Dot United
- Other political affiliations: National Solidarity Party (2012-2015); Singapore People's Party (2015-2016); Progress Singapore Party (2019-2020)
- Education: New Town Secondary School
- Alma mater: National Institute of Education (Certificate in Special Needs Education); Heriot-Watt University (Bachelor of Science in Management)
- Occupation: Politician

Ravi Chandran Philemon (Note: Tamil: ரவி சந்திரன் பிலமோன், romanized: Ravi Cantiraṉ Pilamōṉ) (born 15 May 1968) is a Singaporean politician and the secretary-general of Red Dot United (RDU) since its formation. Previously, Philemon was also a member of the National Solidarity Party (NSP), Progress Singapore Party (PSP) and Singapore People's Party (SPP).

== Political career ==
In 2012, Philemon joined the NSP to help Jeannette Chong-Aruldoss in her campaign. In February 2015, Philemon left the party after unsuccessfully challenging for the post of secretary-general.

In the 2015 general election, Philemon contested Hong Kah North SMC as the SPP candidate against incumbent People's Action Party (PAP) Member of Parliament Amy Khor. Philemon received 25.24% of the vote against Amy Khor's 74.76%.

In the lead-up to the 2020 general election, Philemon joined the newly formed PSP led by Tan Cheng Bock. However, in May 2020, Philemon left the party, joining 10 other members, formed Red Dot United. Philemon led a team to contest Jurong GRC. Red Dot United team received 25.38% of the vote against the PAP's 74.62% of the vote.

Under Philemon's leadership, RDU expanded significantly across Singapore, announcing its intention to contest 18 seats in the 2025 general election. The party eventually contested 15 seats, but failed to win any. Philemon contested in Nee Soon GRC and received 26.19% against the PAP team's 73.81%.
