= 2006 Singaporean general election =

- 6 May 2006

All 84 directly elected seats in Parliament (and up to 3 NCMPs)
- Registered: 2,159,721 (Note: 936,279 of the 2,159,721 voters were registered in uncontested constituencies, leaving 1,223,442 voters able to vote.)
- Turnout: 94.00% (▼0.61pp)
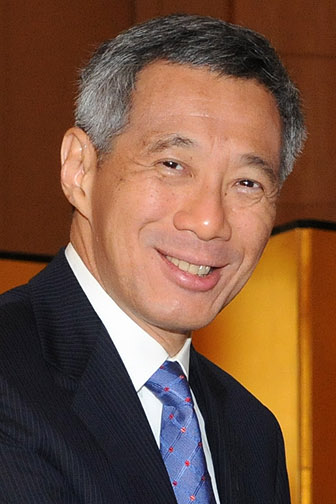

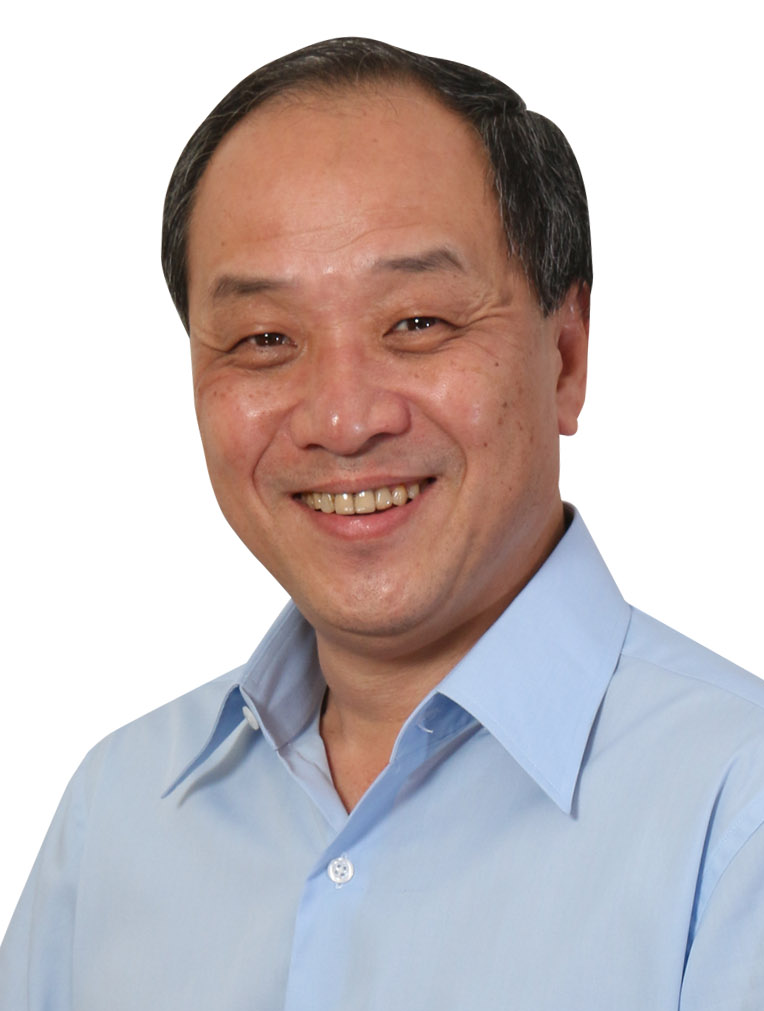

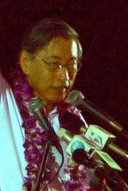
	First party	Second party	Third party
Leader	Lee Hsien Loong	Low Thia Khiang	Chiam See Tong
Party	PAP	WP	SDA
Leader's seat	Ang Mo Kio GRC	Hougang SMC	Potong Pasir SMC
Last election	75.29%, 82 seats	1 seat, 3.05%	12.03%, 2 seats
Seats won	82	2	1
Seat change	Steady	▲1	▼1
Popular vote	748,130	183,578	145,628
Percentage	66.60%	16.34%	12.96%
Swing	▼8.69pp	▲13.29pp	▲0.93pp
- Results by constituency
Prime Minister before election
Lee Hsien Loong
PAP
Prime Minister after election
Lee Hsien Loong
PAP

General elections were held in Singapore on 6 May 2006 to elect members of Parliament. They were the twelfth general elections since the introduction of self-government in 1959 and the tenth since independence in 1965. President S.R. Nathan dissolved parliament on 20 April on the advice of Prime Minister Lee Hsien Loong three weeks before the election. Despite changes to electoral boundaries, the number of elected seats had remained unchanged at 84 from the previous election. This was the first election contested by Lee as prime minister, following his succession of Goh Chok Tong in 2004.

Key issues in the election included employment, the rising cost of living, housing, transport, education, the need for an effective opposition presence in parliament and the overall quality of candidates. Besides regular key issues, controversies surrounding the National Kidney Foundation Singapore scandal the previous year, the carrot-and-stick approach on the opposition-held constituencies, debates about integrated resorts and housing upgrading projects (such as the Main Upgrading Programme and Lift Upgrading Programme), and the avant-garde use of internet, were also featured in their hustings.

For the third consecutive election since the trend began in 1997, the People's Action Party (PAP) won all but two seats with the remaining two seats retained by its respective opposition. Also for the first time since 1988, the PAP was not returned to power during nomination day after 47 seats, more than a majority of the 84 seats in the upcoming parliament, were contested; it also saw the vote shares dropped down to 66.6%. The 2006 election was also the first election since 1968 in which every contest was a direct head-to-head race, and the first election to introduce overseas voting at selected Singaporean diplomatic missions. As of 2025, it remains the most recent election in which two opposition parties succeeded in electing at least one candidate in a constituency that excluded non-constituency seats (NCMPs) as well as the last election in which the ruling PAP won every group representation constituencies (GRCs). It was also the only election to date where no losing candidate forfeited their $13,500 election deposit.

== Background ==
The 2006 general election was the twelfth held since the introduction of self-government in 1959 and the tenth since Singapore's independence in 1965. The governing People's Action Party (PAP) aimed to secure its twelfth consecutive term in office since its first electoral victory in 1959. It was also the first general election led by Lee Hsien Loong as both Prime Minister and Secretary-General of the PAP, following his succession of Goh Chok Tong in 2004.

=== Political parties ===
Three opposition factions challenged PAP in the election, which include the largest opposition faction of the Singapore Democratic Alliance (SDA), led by Singapore People's Party (SPP)'s leader Chiam See Tong along with the National Solidarity Party (NSP) and two other smaller parties, alongside the Workers' Party (WP) and the Singapore Democratic Party (SDP). SDP's leader Chee Soon Juan was ineligible to contest due to bankruptcy following a conviction in 2002 for defamation from the previous election. The only party that did not contest this election was Democratic Progressive Party, where it became dormant in 2002.

Outside the aforementioned parties, former independent candidate Ooi Boon Ewe founded People's Liberal Democratic Party, but by the time the party was registered on 2 May, it was already too late for Ooi to contest as the nominations are complete. It was the only new political party that was created between the two elections.

=== Electorate ===
All citizens at least 21 years of age, based on the Registers of Electors, were eligible to vote. Voting is compulsory. The Elections Department (ELD) had completed its revision of the Registers and made them available for public inspection from 17 January through 30 January 2006. There were 2,158,439 eligible voters. The 2006 election was the first election where more than half the electorate were born after Singapore's post-independence, specifically those of Generation X, and the first election in Singapore of any kind where Millennials (born those of 1980s) were part of the electorate.

For the first time in Singapore's election history, Singaporeans living overseas were able to vote at designated polling stations located within Singapore's diplomatic missions in other countries. To be qualified to vote overseas, they must have had either resided in Singapore for an aggregate of two of the past five years, or be overseas for reasons of employment or education related to the Singapore government. There were eight overseas polling stations, namely Tokyo, Canberra, Beijing, Shanghai, Hong Kong, London, Washington, D.C. and San Francisco. 1,017 Singaporeans had registered for overseas voting by 22 March 2006, although only 558 voted, as the rest had a walkover in their home constituencies. Despite being the first election where overseas voting is featured, this rule was first enacted on 15 May 2001, but it was unused in that year's election per safety reasons in the aftermath of the September 11 attacks, nor the 2005 presidential election because of a walkover.

=== Electoral divisions ===
On 3 March 2006, the Electoral Boundaries Review Committee (EBRC) published the updated list of electoral divisions. There were 14 Group Representation Constituencies (GRC), each with five or six seats, and nine Single Member Constituencies (SMC). The total number of seats remained the same at 84 as the previous general election in 2001.

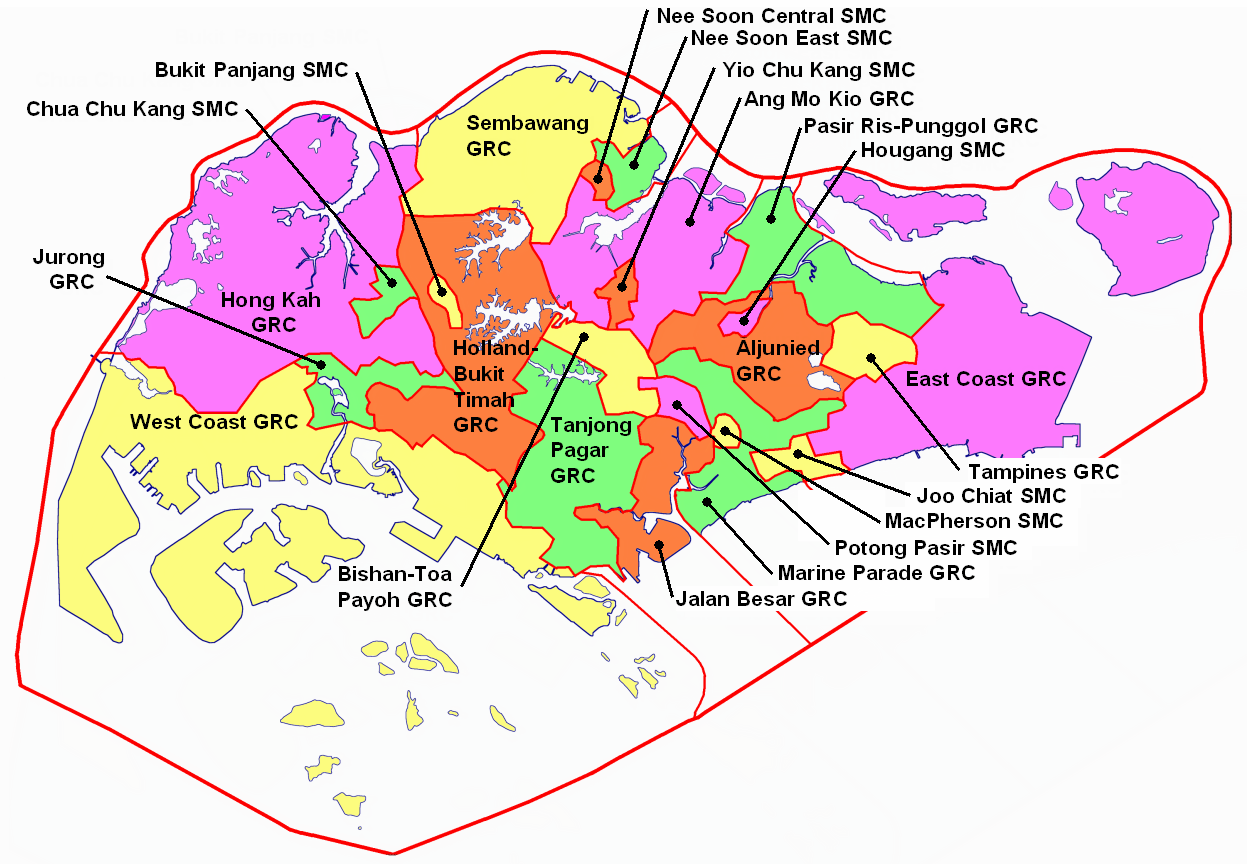
Singapore Electoral Boundaries, released in March 2006.

The population growth of the new towns of Sengkang and Punggol saw the seats of Pasir Ris-Punggol GRC being expanded by one to six (although the electoral boundaries were untouched), while East Coast GRC was reduced by one seat to five following the changes of electorate in Bedok, while carving out Kaki Bukit to the neighbouring Marine Parade GRC; Marine Parade GRC's Serangoon (those of the northern parts of Serangoon and Serangoon Gardens) was redrawn to Aljunied GRC, and in exchange was the Kembangan areas. Holland–Bukit Panjang GRC was renamed to the present-day Holland–Bukit Timah GRC after taking in Bukit Timah SMC in exchange of carving out Bukit Panjang SMC, which last appeared in 1972; this change meant that this was the first election where the original constituencies in 1951 were absent in the map. Only one SMC had boundary changes, which was Nee Soon East; Yio Chu Kang was carved out as an SMC for the first time since 1988, while Ayer Rajah was subsumed into the neighbouring West Coast GRC.

Below here are the changes of boundaries for this election (the five GRCs of Bishan–Toa Payoh, Hong Kah, Jalan Besar, Jurong and Tampines were not listed as their boundaries were left untouched and the number of seats were the same):

Constituency	Changes
Aljunied GRC	Absorbed Serangoon division from Marine Parade GRC; Carved out areas of Pan Island Expressway, Jalan Eunos and Sims Avenue East to Marine Parade GRC; Aljunied-Kembangan and Kembangan-Punggol were reorganised to form the Bedok Reservoir-Punggol division, while the rest were absorbed to Paya Lebar and Kampong Ubi-Kembangan of Marine Parade GRC
Ang Mo Kio GRC	Carved out Yio Chu Kang division into SMC; Jalan Kayu division was carved to include Sengkang West division
East Coast GRC	Ward downsized to five seats Carved out portions of Kampong Chai Chee (including Bedok New Town and Bedok North Green), and Kaki Bukit division to Marine Parade GRC
Holland–Bukit Timah GRC	New Constituency; Formed with Bukit Timah SMC and Holland–Bukit Panjang GRC (except for Bukit Panjang division, which was carved as a SMC)
Marine Parade GRC	Absorbed portions of Kembangan from Aljunied GRC, Kampong Chai Chee and Kaki Bukit divisions from East Coast GRC; Kampong Ubi division was merged with Kembangan to form Kampong Ubi-Kembangan; Carved out Serangoon division to Aljunied GRC
Pasir Ris–Punggol GRC	Ward upsized to six seats Punggol North and South divisions were split to include Punggol East division
Sembawang GRC	Carved out a portion of Yishun to Nee Soon East SMC
Tanjong Pagar GRC	Absorbed a portion of Holland–Bukit Panjang GRC
West Coast GRC	Absorbed Ayer Rajah SMC, with the SMC merged with West Coast division to form Ayer Rajah-West Coast.

=== Election issues ===
As in previous elections, bread and butter issues including jobs, medical care and cost of living dominated the election campaign. Other major election issues are listed in the following.

- Social
  - Integrated Resorts and legalisation of casino gambling
  - Education policy
  - Public transport
  - Public housing policy
  - Lift Upgrading Programme (LUP)
- Governance
  - Progress package and Budget 2006
  - Group representation constituency system
  - Central Provident Fund scheme
  - Internal Security Act and increased civil liberties
  - Ministerial pay
- Others
  - National Kidney Foundation Singapore scandal
  - Integrity of the candidates, such as James Gomez and Steve Chia

== Timeline ==
Date	Event
3 March	Publication of Electoral Boundaries report
3 March	Certification of Registers of Electors
20 April	Dissolution of 10th Parliament; Writ of Election issued
23 April	Deadline of Submission of Political Donation Certificates
27 April	Nomination Day
27 April-5 May	Campaigning Period
29 April	First Live Political Party Broadcast
4 May	Second Live Political Party Broadcast
6 May	Polling Day
10 May	Overseas Votes Counting
30 May	11th Parliament assembled
2 November	Opening of 11th Parliament

== Pre-nomination day events ==
=== Steve Chia controversy ===
On 24 December 2003, Non-constituency Member of Parliament Steve Chia was investigated by the police after his wife, Doreen Chee, made accusations of infidelity and affair after she discovered nude photographs of him and his Indonesian domestic helper, both naked, on his computer. Chia admitted on his "hobby" and his actions, while the helper told the police that she had consented and was not forced into posing for the pictures, and thus Chia was not prosecuted. Nevertheless, the controversy saw Chia relinquishing his secretary-general position of the National Solidarity Party (NSP) and his membership for the Singapore Democratic Alliance's (SDA) executive council in 2005, though he remained as a member of the NSP until 2019. Two months before the election on 17 March, Chia was also fined by the traffic police for driving his car across a traffic junction when the red light was on, resulting in a crash with a bus.

=== Dissolution of Parliament ===
On 20 April 2006, Parliament was dissolved by President S. R. Nathan on the advice of Prime Minister Lee Hsien Loong. Later that day, the President issued the writ of election and the government announced that the election would be held on Saturday, 6 May 2006, with nomination day on Thursday, 27 April 2006. The Returning Officer for the election was Tan Boon Huat, Chief Executive Director of the People's Association, serving this role for the third consecutive general election.

=== New/outgoing candidates ===
A total of 49 candidates made their debut this election such as Muhammad Faishal Ibrahim, Grace Fu, Lui Tuck Yew, Seah Kian Peng, Josephine Teo, Masagos Zulkifli and Zaqy Mohamad for the PAP, while WP introduced their party's chairwoman Sylvia Lim, as well as James Gomez (now SDP member) and Goh Meng Seng (who later founded the People's Power Party).

A total 24 candidates did not seek re-election, among which were former cabinet ministers Lee Yock Suan and former Speaker of Parliament Tan Soo Khoon, as well as future 2011 presidential election candidates Tan Cheng Bock, the founder of Progress Singapore Party, and Deputy Prime Minister of Singapore and eventual President-elect Tony Tan.

=== Budget day and progress package ===
On 17 February 2006, Prime Minister Lee Hsien Loong, who was also Minister for Finance and PAP's Secretary-General, delivered the country's annual Budget Statement to the Parliament. He released details of a S$2.6 billion "progress package" including S$500 million for Central Provident Fund top-ups, S$400 million for workfare bonuses, and S$200 million bonuses for national servicemen. Largely due to this package, the 2006 Budget incurred a deficit of S$2.86 billion.

Low Thia Khiang (WP) came out strongly against the progress package which he said was no more than a vote-winning tool for the PAP. Low called for greater transparency on how the government intend to finance the package and to compensate for the budget shortfall. Deputy Prime Minister Wong Kan Seng (PAP) later dismissed claims that the progress package constitutes a form of vote buying.

=== Workers' Party manifesto ===
The Workers' Party (WP) was the first party to launch an update to its manifesto on 14 January 2006, titled "You Have a Choice", marking their first update into its manifesto in years. Among its policy proposals, WP called for the Presidency to revert to its former ceremonial role and the abolishment of the GRCs, the Ethnic Integration Policy for Housing and Development Board flats, the Resident Committees (RCs) and the Citizen Consultative Committees (CCCs). It also revealed its intentions to establish a central agency in the provision of public transport, set up of a national unemployment insurance scheme and a more comprehensive national health insurance scheme among a host of other things.

On 21 January, PAP made various criticisms on the WP's proposals, describing four of their proposals as "four time bombs...[which] will weaken and tear Singapore apart". Khaw Boon Wan, revealed various changes in medical policies, including the Medisave scheme, which had been a constant target for criticism by opposition parties. He also chided the WP for its "failure to understand what makes inter-racialism work in Singapore and why we are different from the rest of the world", referring the four points brought up by Ng Eng Hen as "poisons" Workers' Party chairman Sylvia Lim released a press statement on 22 January, responding to each of the four "time bombs" criticised by Ng and adding that the party was standing firmly by its manifesto.

=== Goh Chok Tong's special assignment ===
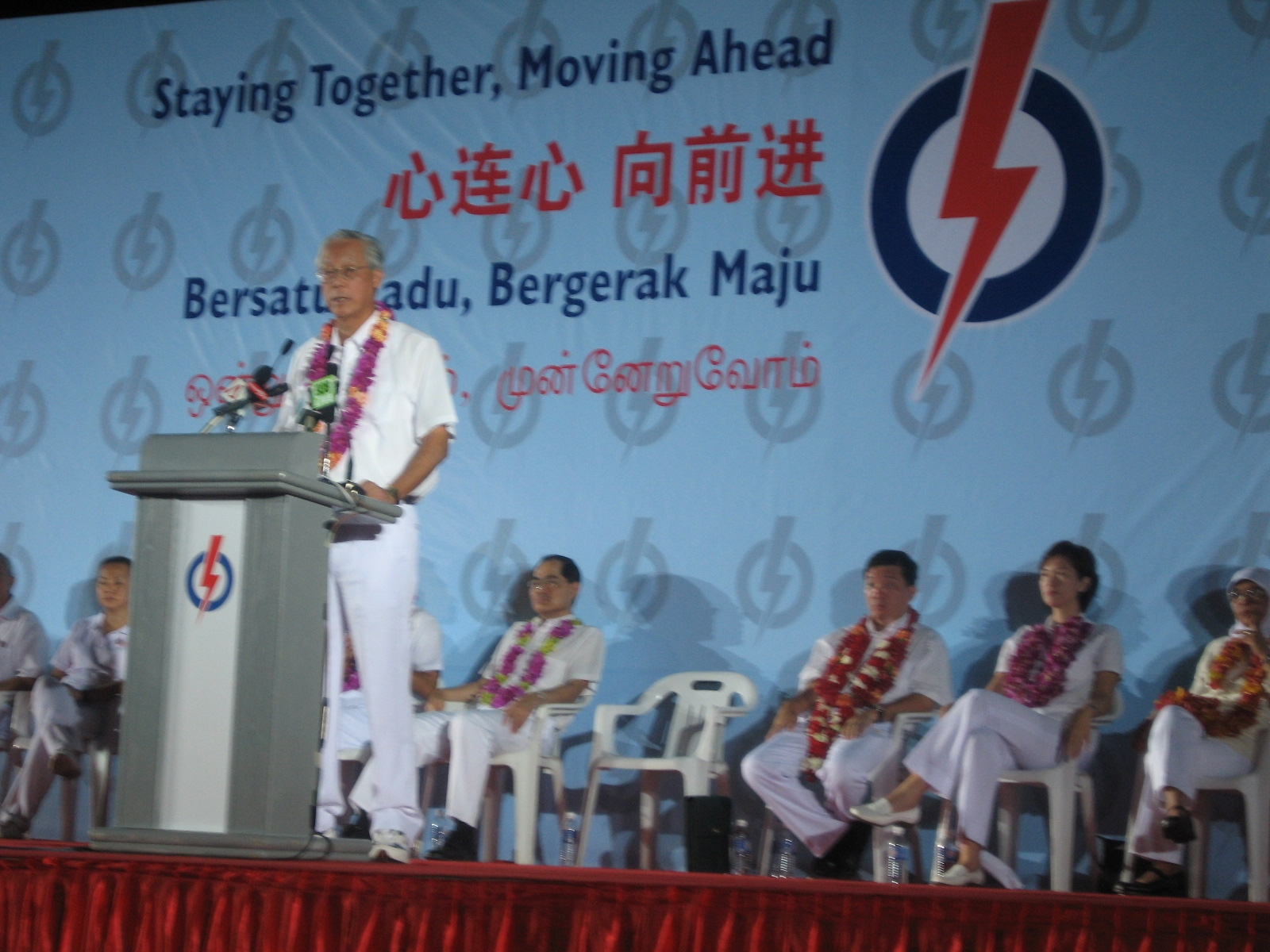
Goh Chok Tong of the PAP, speaking at a rally at Potong Pasir SMC. The banner behind him shows the campaign slogan of the party, "Staying Together, Moving Ahead".

On 19 March, Lee Hsien Loong announced that Eric Low and Sitoh Yih Pin, who were respectively the previously-contested candidates for opposition wards Hougang SMC and Potong Pasir SMC, would recontest after working the ground in these wards since along with assistance by Goh Chok Tong who had been given the special assignment to help them wrestle back the wards, citing that it is not a "masak-masak" (literally mean a children's game in Malay).

Goh had suggested that if Low and Sitoh won the election, they would be given extra latitude when speaking and voting in parliament and not be subjected to the political Whip, and he would also help Sitoh to gain a post in the new Cabinet should he was successful. Hougang and Potong Pasir residents were also promised housing upgrades worth $100 million and $80 million respectively if PAP was to retake the two seats as both of these constituencies have not been selected for housing upgrades or provided with lifts that stop on every floor due to the constituencies being held by the opposition. When the PAP shaved WP's vote share from 58% to 55% in the last election, Goh offered to upgrade Hougang estate if the share was reduced to 52%.

=== Remarks in The New Democrat ===
In April 2006, the SDP published an article headlined "Govt's role in the NKF scandal" in the SDP party newspaper The New Democrat regarding the National Kidney Foundation Singapore scandal. On 22 April, letters of demand were served on twelve members of the SDP and the publisher. Drew and Napier, the law firm acting for Lee Hsien Loong and Lee Kuan Yew, said that the newspaper article had alleged that the two Lees were "dishonest and unfit for office", that Lee Kuan Yew "devised a corrupt political system for the benefit of the political elite", and that he managed the Government of Singapore Investment Corporation in a "corrupt manner". In addition, according to the letter of demand, the newspaper also alleged that Lee Hsien Loong had "perpetuated a corrupt political system for the benefit of the political elite" and how he and his Government "had access to the information which has now been unearthed about NKF but corruptly concealed and covered up the facts to avoid criticism". The letters demanded that damages be paid and an apology made in the media by 25 April.

Four of SDP's eleven committee members apologized shortly after, while the party's chairman refused to do so, as it would constitute "an admission of guilt". An apology had been formally rejected by the party, though the party would not oppose individual members making personal apologies; as of the election, the Chee's siblings refused to apologize despite the CEC's meeting and demands for them to do so. M Ravi, the lawyer representing most of the accused, had rejected claims made in the letters that allegations made in the paper were "highly defamatory", and he "[does] not see how a government or public body could be defamed". On 27 April, Chee said that the threat of legal action was already seriously affecting SDP's campaign at Sembawang GRC: "Lawyers for Mr Lee Kuan Yew and Mr Lee Hsien Loong have gone as far as to sue the printer, so much so that he is so frightened he dares not publish our election material."

=== SDP podcast ===
On 25 April, the Elections Department warned SDP that it would take action against the party if they did not remove audio files and podcasts from the party's website, as they were against election advertising regulations under the Parliamentary Elections Act. Within hours after the notice was issued, SDP posted a notice on its website that the podcast service was suspended.

== Nomination day ==
=== Nomination centres ===
After the writ of election was issued on 21 April 2006, nine schools were designated as nomination centres:

Nomination centre	Electoral division(s)
Admiralty Secondary School	Nee Soon Central SMC; Nee Soon East SMC; Sembawang GRC^{M}
Bedok View Secondary School	East Coast GRC^{M} Pasir Ris-Punggol GRC^{M}
Bendeemer Primary School	Jalan Besar GRC^{M} Potong Pasir SMC; Tanjong Pagar GRC^{IO}
Bukit Panjang Government High School	Chua Chu Kang SMC; Hong Kah GRC^{M}
Fajar Secondary School	Bukit Panjang SMC; Holland-Bukit Timah GRC^{IO}
Jurong Junior College	Jurong GRC^{IO} West Coast GRC^{IO}
Ngee Ann Secondary School	Hougang SMC; Tampines GRC^{M}
Pei Chun Public School	Aljunied GRC^{M} Ang Mo Kio GRC^{IO} Bishan-Toa Payoh GRC^{IO} Yio Chu Kang SMC
Tao Nan School	Joo Chiat SMC; MacPherson SMC; Marine Parade GRC^{M}

- A ^{M} indicates a GRC requires a Malay/Muslim minority candidate, while ^{IO} indicates a GRC requires an Indian or other minority candidate.

=== Planning for nomination day by political parties ===
As early as January 2006, when it became clear that the election would be held soon, the political parties began making definitive plans for Nomination Day.

On 10 March 2006, major opposition parties hosted a meeting, after which they announced their intention to contest 57 of the 84 seats in Parliament, but full details of the opposition's plan was not revealed until Nomination Day itself. Steve Chia told reporters, "Any self-respecting politician will hold his cards close to his chest."

While there were nine Single Member Constituencies for the election, smaller political parties and independents opted to tackle each SMCs while lacking sufficient candidates and resources in contesting Group Representation Constituencies. Many analysts cited that opposition candidates stand a greater chance of winning in SMCs as compared to GRCs, and all nine SMCs were expecting contests. Furthermore, the opposition tried to avoid three-cornered fights by co-ordinating with each other, notably SPP's chief Chiam See Tong (SPP), citing that it was risky if this happens.

In March 2006, plans for a three-way contest in MacPherson SMC were surfaced with proposals of two chairmen, DPP's Mansor Rahman and SPP's Sin Kek Tong setting to challenge the ward, but neither of them eventually contested. Tan Lead Shake, a former DPP member, later joined the National Solidarity Party (NSP) (now under the banner in Singapore Democratic Alliance), and became a member of SDA's team contesting Tampines GRC.

=== Early announcement of intention by parties ===
Some of the opposition parties, such as Workers' Party and Singapore Democratic Alliance, adopted the strategy of announcing early their plans on which constituencies they intended to contest prior to announced changes in electoral boundaries, as a tactical move to earmark those divisions to discourage any third party from contesting in the same divisions leading to three-cornered fights. Another cited reason was that, if the Government electoral commission redrew those boundaries, the opposition would be able to exploit such actions by accusing the PAP of gerrymandering to avoid the ballot challenge.

=== Nomination day results ===
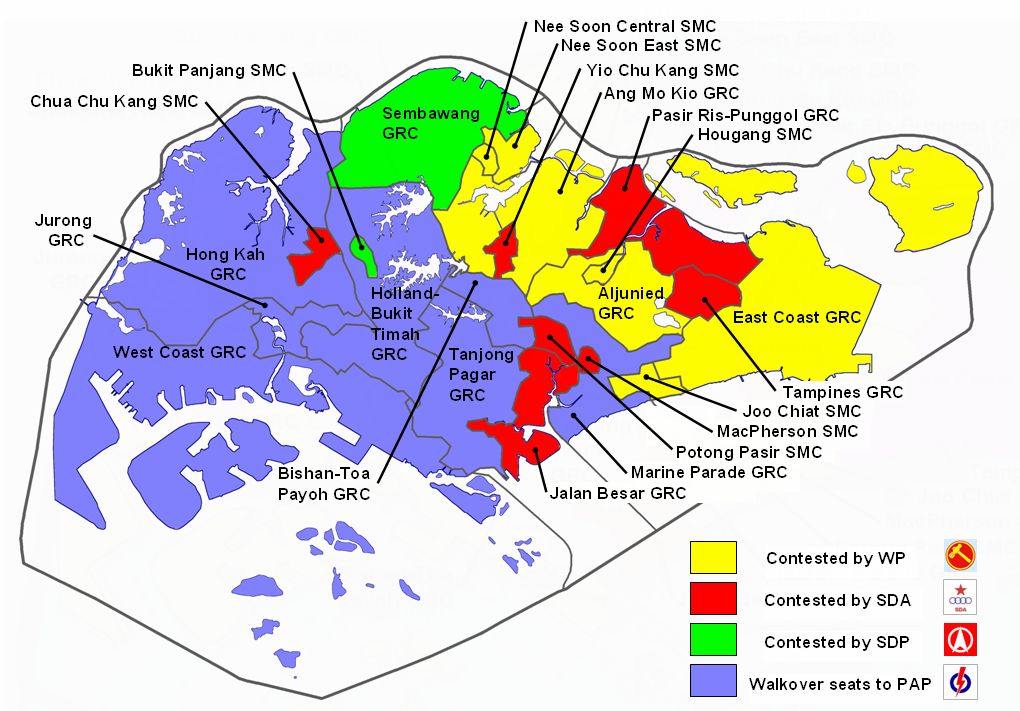
Electoral map showing the various contests. The PAP fielded candidates in all 84 seats, with 37 seats (shown in blue) won as walkovers on nomination day. The battlegrounds were the remaining 47 seats contested by WP (yellow), SDA (red), and SDP (green).

On nomination day 47 opposition candidates (up from 29 from 2001) managed to contest 16 out of 23 constituencies as planned, therefore the party was prevented from forming the government via uncontested seats for the first time since 1988, an eventuality made by observers that proved to be true. All 16 contested constituencies were head-to-head between PAP and one opposition party (two SDP, and seven each from SDA and WP), which marked the first election since 1968 without any multi-cornered fights. For the first time since 1980, no independent candidates participated in this election, which was a rare occurrence as independent candidates had participated in every election since 1955, likely due to new election laws requiring presence of assenters in Nomination Centres, posing difficulty for candidates without a party machinery. It also saw the first-ever contests for six-member GRCs of Ang Mo Kio, Pasir Ris-Punggol, Sembawang, as well as East Coast, all of which were previously uncontested when the wards are formed.

=== Diversity of candidates ===
Notably, all 18 candidates contested in SMCs were male Chinese. On 28 April, Lee Kuan Yew (PAP) referred to this fact when defending the Group Representation Constituency (GRC) system on the grounds that it ensures minority and women representation in parliament, although there is no prerequisites on GRCs having at least one female candidate.

== Events between nomination day and election day ==
Between 28 April to 5 May, a total of 50 political rallies were held by the parties at 24 designated sites during nine days of campaign. The "Lunchtime Rally Site" at Boat Quay, next to UOB Plaza, made a comeback in the election; it was removed from the list of rally sites in the previous election due to fears of terrorist attacks after the September 11, 2001 attacks.

=== Battleground states ===
The two WP teams had contested on two wards (both being uncontested in the last election) that are considered as battleground states: Aljunied GRC was contested by the party's A-team led by chairman Sylvia Lim, and Ang Mo Kio GRC led by Yaw Shin Leong and several Generation X candidates, in which PAP's anchor and leader Lee called it as a "敢死队" (suicide squad) and WP claimed they were not pushovers.

Likewise, SDA also had two contested wards that were regarded as fierce contests: Jalan Besar GRC was contested by the party's A-team which also comprise Sebestian Teo and former MP Cheo Chai Chen, and Chua Chu Kang SMC where NCMP Steve Chia faced its contest this time against PAP's Gan Kim Yong, who shifted from Zhenghua to contest there following the departure of incumbent Low Seow Chay.

In regards on whether if Goh Chok Tong's special assignment was successful, both Hougang and Potong Pasir were once again marked as hotspots, with the latter being notable due to the advanced age of incumbent MP Chiam See Tong.

=== James Gomez saga ===
Controversy arose during the election surrounding the application for a minority-race candidate certificate by James Gomez of Workers' Party. On 24 April, Gomez went to the Elections Department to fill up the minority-race candidate certificate application form accompanied by the chairperson Sylvia Lim. Instead of handing in the application form to election official, Gomez slipped the form in his bag and went off for an interview. At the time, Sylvia Lim had gone to a waiting area and did not witness the event.

On the eve of Nomination Day, James Gomez went to collect his minority-race candidate certificate claiming he had submitted the application form. After failing to get the certificate, Gomez warned an elections officer of the "consequences". At 1 pm that day, an Elections Department staff called Gomez and told him that he did not submit the Indian and minority candidate certificate form. During the call, which was recorded, Gomez changed his story and said that he would get back to them. When the media asked him about the issue, Gomez initially refused to discuss about the issue, but later conceded. Following two days of dispute between both sides, the Elections Department was able to produce video evidence showing that James Gomez did not submit the application form; a day later, James Gomez apologised to the Elections Department at a Worker's Party rally saying he was distracted by his busy schedule.

During the controversy, PAP raised questions about the credibility of Gomez. He was accused of attempting to discredit the Elections Department by claiming they misplaced the form. Two PAP leaders Wong Kan Seng and Lee Kuan Yew called Gomez a "liar" and Lee dared Gomez to sue him and Wong. George Yeo (PAP) also suggested that the Worker's Party should sack Gomez and field a four-member team for the five-member Group Representation Constituency. This was rejected by Low who asserted that PAP was trying to divert public and media attention from main election issues.

=== Party political broadcast ===
On both 29 April 2006 and 4 May 2006, the four contesting parties made their political broadcasts over television and radio in the four official languages – the English, Mandarin, Malay and Tamil languages. Each party was given an allocated time based on the number of candidates it fielded. The People's Action Party (PAP) was given 12 minutes with 84 candidates fielded, the Workers' Party (WP) and Singapore Democratic Alliance (SDA) were given 4.5 minutes each with 20 candidates fielded, and the Singapore Democratic Party (SDP) was given 2.5 minutes with 7 candidates fielded. The SDP was represented by Chee Siok Chin, the Workers' Party by Sylvia Lim on the first broadcast and by Tan Hui Hua on the second broadcast, the SDA by Chiam See Tong on both broadcasts, with the PAP by Prime Minister Lee Hsien Loong on the first broadcast and by PAP chairman Lim Boon Heng on the second broadcast.

=== Debate on housing and lift upgrading ===
The upgrading of public housing, including the Lift Upgrading Programme (LUP), was a flashpoint in this election. As in previous elections, PAP had tied the scheduling of housing upgrades to the number of votes the party received in the election. The PAP argued that government was successful in raising the standard of living in the country, and those who supported its various policies, including the upgrading, should be given priority. In the hotly contested Aljunied GRC, George Yeo (PAP) placed lift upgrading the "top of [his] priority list" so that the lift would stop on every floor in as many blocks as possible. Sylvia Lim (WP) accused the PAP of being selective in its upgrading programmes, arguing that this was a divisive policy.

=== Large turnout at opposition election rallies ===
The election featured large turnouts at some of the election rallies of the opposition parties, which was unheard of since the 1980s. A report by Malaysian press The Star estimated that around 10,000 people attended the Workers' Party rally on 30 April at Hougang. The PAP dismissed the significance of the crowds, suggesting that crowd size would not necessarily translate into votes.

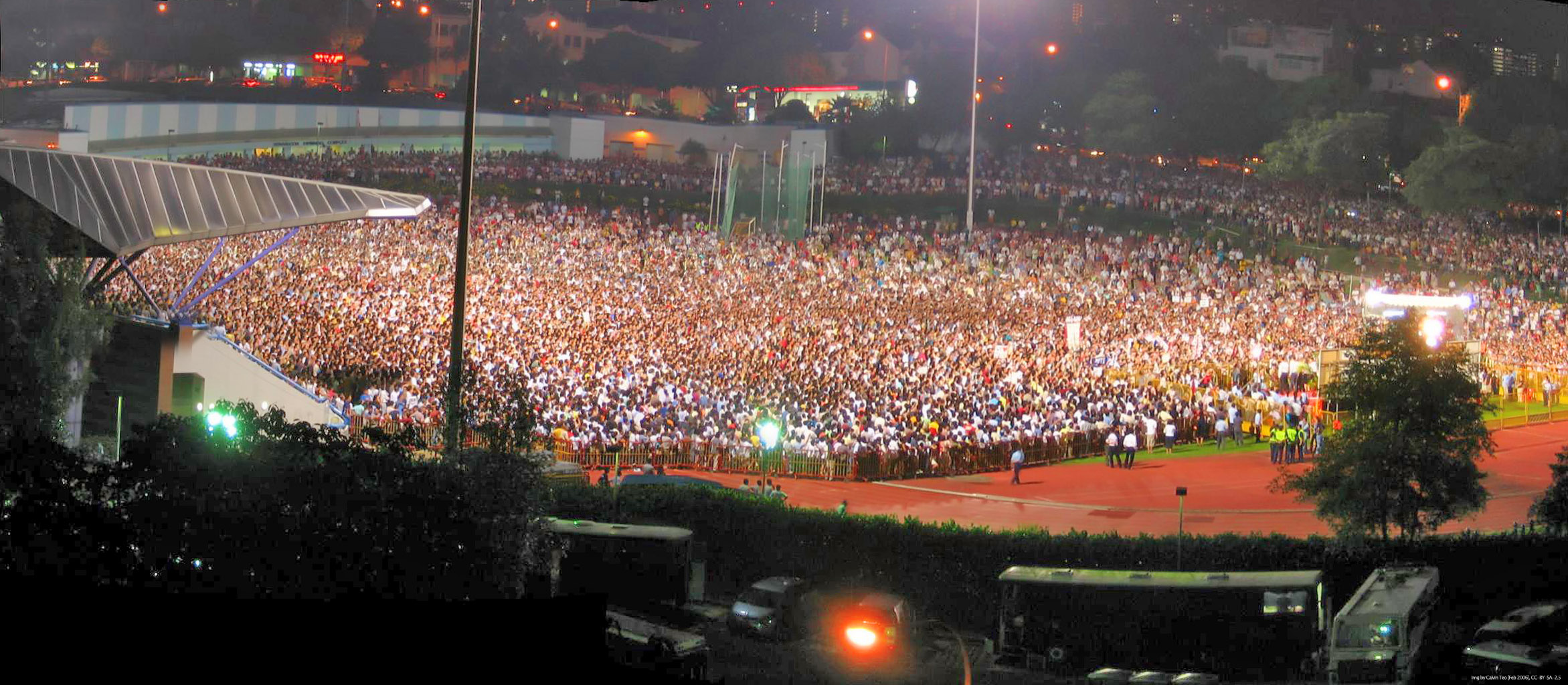
A large number of supporters turned up at the last Worker's Party Rally for Aljunied GRC, filling up much of the field in Serangoon Stadium.

== Results ==
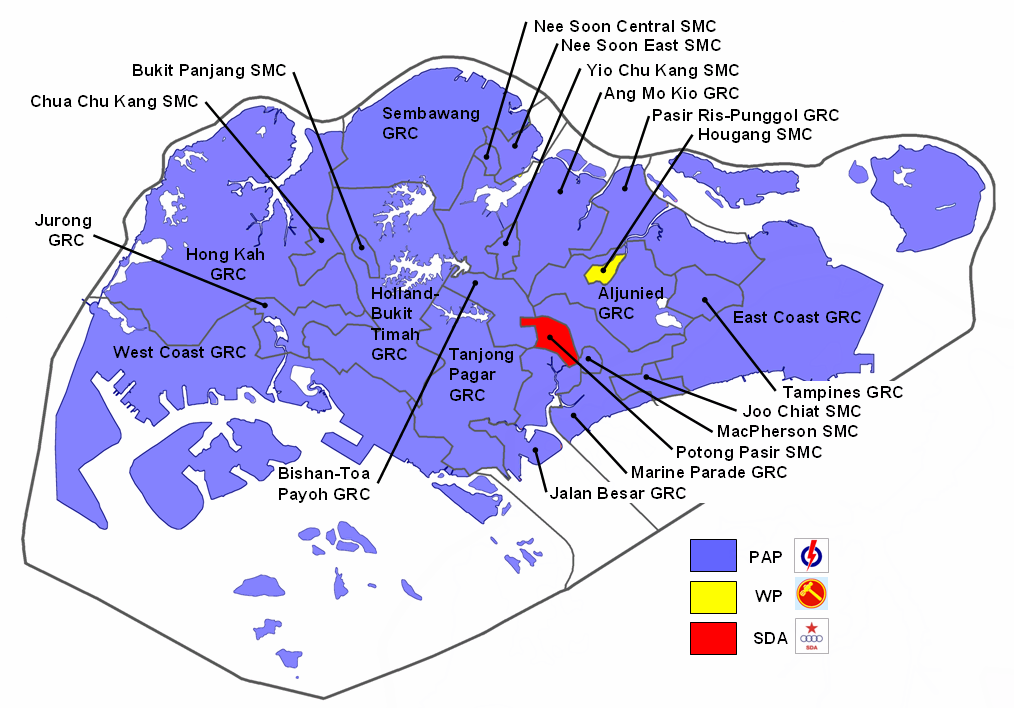
Results by constituency.

The People's Action Party won a 12th consecutive term with its majority virtually untouched, but vote majorities were reduced island-wide. Bukit Panjang SMC had the best performing score for the election with 77.18%, followed by Sembawang GRC with a score of 76.70%; both wards were contested by SDP. Goh's special assignment in which winning the two opposition-held constituencies were unsuccessful as opposition MPs were re-elected with swings toward their parties, among which Hougang won its largest share of 62.74%, a then-record for the Workers' Party. Notably for the first and only time in any Singaporean elections, the PAP leader's ward of Ang Mo Kio GRC had a score slightly lower than the national average by around 0.5%.

Out of the 1,223,442 eligible voters in the 16 contested constituencies, 1,150,003 voted, with a 94% turnout rate.

Popular vote
1. PAP (66.6%)
2. WP (16.3%)
3. SDA (13.0%)
4. SDP (4.09%)
Elected seats won
1. 37 seats (PAP; uncontested) (44.0%)
2. 45 seats (PAP; contested) (53.6%)
3. 1 seat (WP) (1.19%)
4. 1 seat (SDA) (1.19%)

Party	Votes	%	+/–	Seats	+/–
People's Action Party	748,130	66.60	–8.69	82	0
Workers' Party	183,578	16.34	+13.29	2	+1
Singapore Democratic Alliance	145,628	12.96	+0.93	1	–1
Singapore Democratic Party	45,937	4.09	–4.00	0	0
Total	1,123,273	100.00	–	85	0
Valid votes	1,123,273	97.68			
Invalid/blank votes	26,730	2.32			
Total votes	1,150,003	100.00			
Registered voters/turnout	2,159,721	94.00			
Source: Singapore Elections

Opposition parties contested vote
Party	Votes
WP	38.43%
SDA	32.52%
SDP	23.23%

=== By constituency ===
Results of 2006 Singapore general election
Constituency	Seats	Voters	Party	Candidate(s)	Votes	Votes %	Overseas vote difference	Swing	Margins
Bukit Panjang SMC	1	30,452	People's Action Party	Teo Ho Pin	21,652	77.18 / 100	▲0.01	N/A	54.36%
Bukit Panjang SMC	1	30,452	Singapore Democratic Party	Ling How Doong	6,400	22.82 / 100	▼0.01	N/A	54.36%
Chua Chu Kang SMC	1	24,975	People's Action Party	Gan Kim Yong	14,156	60.37 / 100	Steady	▼4.97	20.74%
Chua Chu Kang SMC	1	24,975	Singapore Democratic Alliance	Steve Chia	9,292	39.63 / 100	Steady	▲4.97	20.74%
Hougang SMC	1	23,759	Workers' Party	Low Thia Khiang	13,989	62.74 / 100	Steady	▲7.76	25.48%
Hougang SMC	1	23,759	People's Action Party	Eric Low	8,308	37.26 / 100	Steady	▼7.76	25.48%
Joo Chiat SMC	1	21,858	People's Action Party	Chan Soo Sen	12,226	65.01 / 100	Steady	▼18.54	30.02%
Joo Chiat SMC	1	21,858	Workers' Party	Tan Bin Seng	6,580	34.99 / 100	Steady	N/A	30.02%
MacPherson SMC	1	21,041	People's Action Party	Matthias Yao	13,184	68.28 / 100	Steady	▼15.45	36.76%
MacPherson SMC	1	21,041	Singapore Democratic Alliance	Sin Kek Tong	6,067	31.52 / 100	Steady	N/A	36.76%
Nee Soon Central SMC	1	23,152	People's Action Party	Ong Ah Heng	14,211	65.37 / 100	Steady	▼13.15	31.74%
Nee Soon Central SMC	1	23,152	Workers' Party	Lian Chin Way	7,529	34.63 / 100	Steady	N/A	31.74%
Nee Soon East SMC	1	32,586	People's Action Party	Ho Peng Kee	20,949	68.72 / 100	Steady	▼4.96	37.44%
Nee Soon East SMC	1	32,586	Workers' Party	Poh Lee Guan	9,535	31.28 / 100	Steady	▲4.96	37.44%
Potong Pasir SMC	1	15,888	Singapore Democratic Alliance	Chiam See Tong	8,245	55.82 / 100	▼0.02	▲3.39	11.64%
Potong Pasir SMC	1	15,888	People's Action Party	Sitoh Yih Pin	6,527	44.18 / 100	▲0.02	▼3.39	11.64%
Yio Chu Kang SMC	1	25,072	People's Action Party	Seng Han Thong	15,726	68.28 / 100	▲0.01	N/A	36.56%
Yio Chu Kang SMC	1	25,072	Singapore Democratic Alliance	Yip Yew Weng	7,307	31.72 / 100	▼0.01	N/A	36.56%
Aljunied GRC	5	145,141	People's Action Party	George Yeo Yong-Boon; Yeo Guat Kwang; Cynthia Phua; Lim Hwee Hua; Zainul Abidin Bin Mohamed Rasheed	74,843	56.09 / 100	▲0.01	N/A	12.18%
Aljunied GRC	5	145,141	Workers' Party	Goh Meng Seng; James Gomez; Sylvia Lim (Note: Elected as NCMP.); Mohammed Rahizan Bin Yaacob; Tan Wui-Hua	58,593	43.91 / 100	▼0.01	N/A	12.18%
Bishan–Toa Payoh GRC	5	115,323	People's Action Party	Wong Kan Seng; Ng Eng Hen; Josephine Teo; Hri Kumar; Zainudin Bin Nordin	Uncontested Walkover				
East Coast GRC	5	116,653	People's Action Party	Lee Yi Shyan; Abdullah Tarmugi; Shunmugam Jayakumar; Jessica Tan; Raymond Lim	66,931	63.86 / 100	▲0.01	N/A	27.72%
East Coast GRC	5	116,653	Workers' Party	Abdul Rahim Abdul Rahman; Brandon Siow; Chia Ti Lik; Eric Tan; Perry Tong	37,873	36.14 / 100	▼0.01	N/A	27.72%
Holland–Bukit Timah GRC	5	118,155	People's Action Party	Lim Swee Say; Christopher de Souza; Foo Yee Shoon; Liang Eng Hwa; Vivian Balakrishnan	Uncontested Walkover				
Hong Kah GRC	5	144,677	People's Action Party	Ang Mong Seng; Yeo Cheow Tong; Amy Khor; Alvin Yeo; Zaqy B Mohamad	Uncontested Walkover				
Jalan Besar GRC	5	93,025	People's Action Party	Lee Boon Yang; Lily Neo; Denise Phua; Heng Chee How; Yaacob Ibrahim	58,913	69.26 / 100	Steady	▼5.23	38.52%
Jalan Besar GRC	5	93,025	Singapore Democratic Alliance	Cheo Chai Chen; Reno Fong; Muhamad Ali Aman; Sebastian Teo; Vincent Yeo	26,151	30.74 / 100	Steady	▲5.23	38.52%
Jurong GRC	5	116,636	People's Action Party	Tharman Shanmugaratnam; Lim Boon Heng; Ong Chit Chung; Grace Fu; Halimah Bte Yacob	Uncontested Walkover				
Tampines GRC	5	126,163	People's Action Party	Mah Bow Tan; Masagos Zulkifli Bin Masagos Mohamad; Irene Ng Phek Hoong; Ong Kian Min; Sin Boon Ann	80,376	68.51 / 100	Steady	▼4.83	37.02%
Tampines GRC	5	126,163	Singapore Democratic Alliance	Abdul Rahman bin Mohamad; Arthero Lim; Ng Say Eng; Ong Hock Siong; Tan Lead Shake	36,948	31.49 / 100	Steady	▲4.83	37.02%
West Coast GRC	5	137,739	People's Action Party	Fong Jen Arthur; Cederic Foo; Madeleine Ho; S Iswaran; Lim Hng Kiang	Uncontested Walkover				
Ang Mo Kio GRC	6	159,872	People's Action Party	Lee Hsien Loong; Balaji Sadasivan [[[Inderjit Singh (politician)|Inderjit Singh]] Lam Pin Min; Lee Bee Wah [Wee Siew Kim]]	96,636	66.14 / 100	▲0.01	N/A	32.28%
Ang Mo Kio GRC	6	159,872	Workers' Party	Abdul Salim Bin Harun; Gopal Krishnan; Han Su May; Lee Wai Leng; Melvin Tan Kian Hwee; Yaw Shin Leong	49,479	33.86 / 100	▼0.01	N/A	32.28%
Marine Parade GRC	6	155,149	People's Action Party	Goh Chok Tong; Lim Biow Chuan; Fatimah Lateef; Muhammad Faishal Ibrahim; Ong Seh Hong; Seah Kian Peng	Uncontested Walkover				
Pasir Ris–Punggol GRC	6	178,443	People's Action Party	Teo Chee Hean; Ahmad Bin Mohd Magad; Charles Chong; Michael Anthony Palmer; Penny Low; Teo Ser Luck	113,322	68.70 / 100	Steady	N/A	37.40%
Pasir Ris–Punggol GRC	6	178,443	Singapore Democratic Alliance	Ishak Bin Haroun; Desmond Lim; Lineker Lee; Mohd Hamim Bin Aliyas; Elvin Ong; Yen Kim Khooi	51,618	31.30 / 100	Steady	N/A	37.40%
Sembawang GRC	6	184,804	People's Action Party	Lim Wee Kiak; Ellen Lee; Hawazi Daipi; K Shanmugam; Khaw Boon Wan; Mohd Maliki Osman	130,170	76.70 / 100	Steady	N/A	53.40%
Sembawang GRC	6	184,804	Singapore Democratic Party	Chee Siok Chin; Christopher Neo; Francis Yong; Gerald Sng; Mohd Isa Abdul Aziz; Narayanasamy Gogelavany	39,537	23.30 / 100	Steady	N/A	53.40%
Tanjong Pagar GRC	6	148,141	People's Action Party	Lee Kuan Yew; Lui Tuck Yew; Baey Yam Keng; Indranee Thurai Rajah; Koo Tsai Kee; Tan Chin Siong	Uncontested Walkover				

=== By Community Development Council ===
In the first election since 1988 where more than half of the total seats are contested, the vote shares for the oppositions had improved significantly, which contributed to a decline of PAP vote share. While the North East CDC being the only one without walkovers among constituencies, the South West CDC region saw its fewest seats being contested, with only one being the Chua Chu Kang SMC; probably as a result, that CDC also was the lowest-scoring PAP vote based on region.

Between WP and SDA who fielded the same number of candidate in seven constituencies each, with three CDC being common (the Central Singapore, North East, and South East CDCs), WP outperformed its contested vote share against SDA, making WP their largest opposition party. Despite the North East CDC polled strongly by the WP in Aljunied GRC and Hougang SMC, with the former narrowly lost but awarded NCMPs and the latter being elected, SDA outperformed better in terms on the contested vote share by CDC, due to the contests in larger electorates (of Pasir Ris-Punggol and Tampines GRCs); instead, WP fared better in the South East CDC, with a vote share of nearly a double of that of North East CDC. WP also prevailed the contested vote share in the Central Singapore CDC, which was largely attributed to the results within national average in Ang Mo Kio GRC despite SDA also retaining Potong Pasir SMC with a positive vote swing.

On the other hand, the North West CDC topped the PAP vote share based on region, which include the two top-scoring wards of Bukit Panjang SMC and Sembawang GRC, both of which were contested by SDP.

==== Votes polled ====
CDC				
CDC	PAP	WP	SDA	SDP
Central	66.10%	18.39%	15.50%	
Northeast	63.21%	16.57%	20.22%	
Northwest	74.80%	6.83%		18.38%
Southeast	64.64%	31.12%	4.25%	
Southwest	60.37%		39.63%	
TOTAL	66.60%	16.34%	12.96%	4.09%

==== Seats won ====
CDC	Seats				
CDC	Seats	PAP	WP	SDA	SDP
Central	21	20	0	1	
Northeast	17	16	1	0	
Northwest	14	14	0		0
Southeast	13	13	0	0	
Southwest	16	16		0	
TOTAL	84	82	1	1	0

=== Analysis ===
==== Top five best PAP performers ====
- Constituencies with no comparison to 2001 were either due to them being new constituencies or the constituencies experiencing walkovers in the last election.

#	Constituency	People's Action Party			Opposition			
#	Constituency	Votes	%	Swing		Votes	%	Swing
1	Bukit Panjang SMC	21,652	77.18	New	Singapore Democratic Party	6,400	22.62	New
2	Sembawang GRC	130,170	76.70	Walkover	Singapore Democratic Party	39,537	23.30	Walkover
3	Jalan Besar GRC	58,913	69.26	▼5.23	Singapore Democratic Alliance	26,151	30.74	▲5.23
4	Nee Soon East SMC	20,949	68.72	▼4.96	Workers' Party	9,535	31.28	▲4.96
5	Pasir Ris-Punggol GRC	113,322	68.70	Walkover	Singapore Democratic Alliance	51,618	31.30	Walkover

==== Top five best opposition performers ====
- Constituencies with no comparison to 2001 were either due to them being new constituencies or the constituencies experiencing walkovers in the last election.

Constituency		Opposition				People's Action Party		
Constituency		Votes		%	Swing	Votes	%	Swing
1	Hougang SMC	Workers' Party	13,989	62.74	▲7.76	8,308	37.26	▼7.76
2	Potong Pasir SMC	Singapore Democratic Alliance	8,245	55.82	▲3.39	6,527	44.18	▼3.39
3	Aljunied GRC	Workers' Party	58,593	43.91	Walkover	74,843	56.09	Walkover
4	Chua Chu Kang SMC	Singapore Democratic Alliance	9,292	39.63	▲4.97	14,156	60.37	▼4.97
5	East Coast GRC	Workers' Party	37,873	36.14	Walkover	66,931	63.86	Walkover

==== Top five Vote Swings ====
- Only the following constituencies may be compared with 2001 results as they existed in both elections, although most had changes in their electoral boundaries.

Constituency		People's Action Party			Opposition			
Constituency		2001 %	2006 %	Swing	Party contesting	2001 %	2006 %	Swing
1	Joo Chiat SMC	83.55%	65.01%	▼18.54%	Workers' Party	16.45%	34.99%	▲18.54%
2	MacPherson SMC	83.73%	68.28%	▼15.45%	Singapore Democratic Alliance	16.27%	31.52%	▲15.45%
3	Nee Soon Central SMC	78.52%	65.37%	▼13.15%	Workers' Party	21.48%	34.63%	▲13.15%
4	Hougang SMC	45.02%	37.26%	▼7.76%	Workers' Party	54.98%	62.74%	▲7.76%
5	Jalan Besar GRC	74.48%	69.26%	▼5.23%	Singapore Democratic Alliance	25.51%	30.74%	▲5.23%

== Aftermath ==
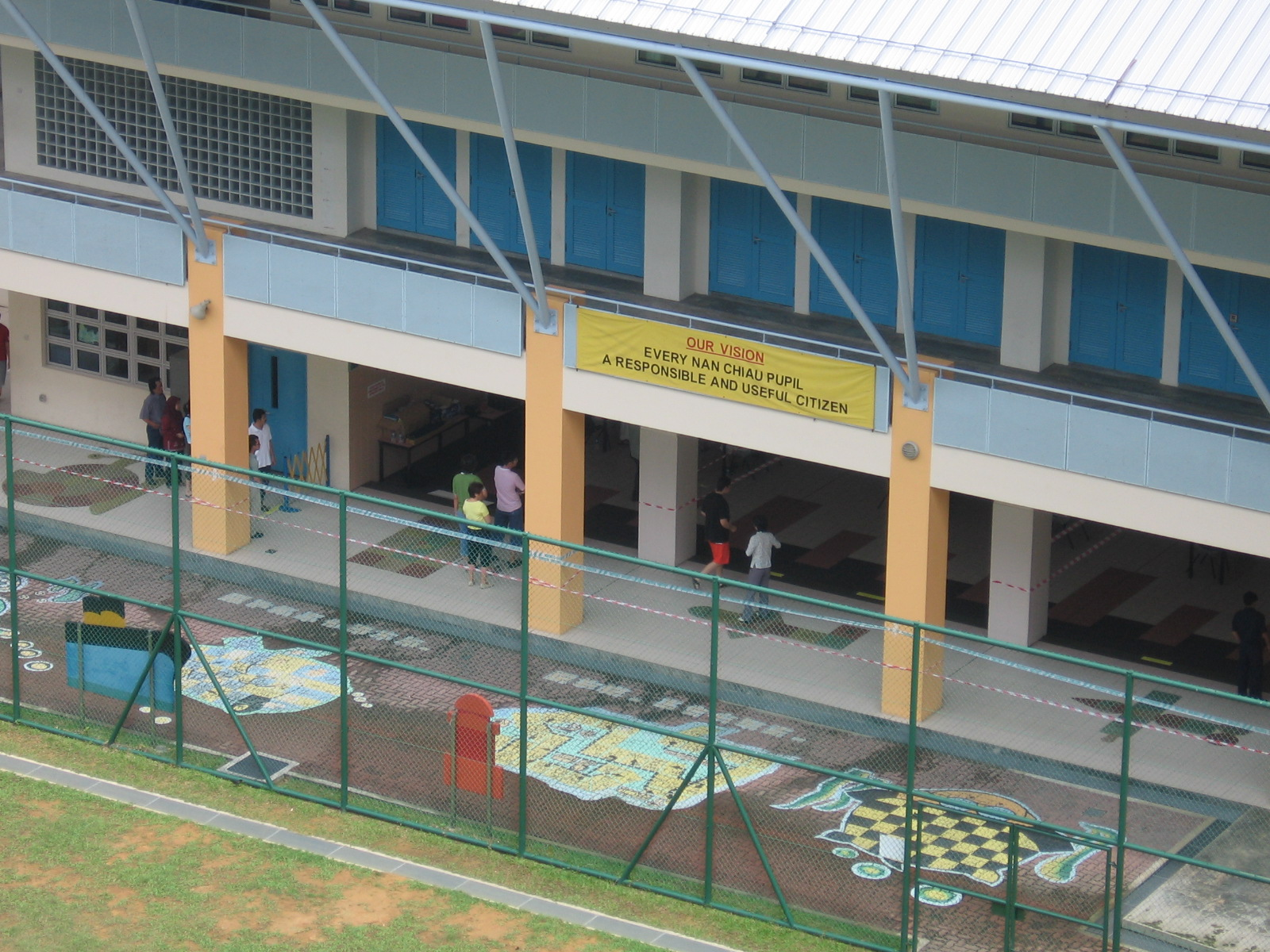
Voters await to cast their votes at the polling centre at Nan Chiau Primary School for Ang Mo Kio GRC.

=== Non-Constituency Member of Parliament ===
Elections Department announced that the Workers' Party team for Aljunied GRC received the highest share of votes among losing constituencies with 43.9%, and the party was allowed to appoint a member as Non-Constituency Member of Parliament, replacing Steve Chia. The Central Executive Committee voted for Sylvia Lim with nine in favour and one opposed. Lim would not represent any constituency but she said she was looking forward to the opportunity to fulfil her obligation to supporters and also to voice people's concerns.

=== Detaining and questioning of Gomez ===
On 7 May, Gomez was detained by police at Singapore Changi Airport when he was about to take a flight to Sweden for work. The police were investigating an "alleged offences of criminal intimidation and providing false information". The Elections Department had earlier filed a police report regarding the incident during the election period in which Gomez spoke to an election official in a threatening tone, an episode that was caught on closed-circuit television. Gomez was brought to the Criminal Investigations Department (CID) at Police Cantonment Complex for questioning and to file his statement, after which he was released at midnight. His passport was impounded by the police to prevent him from leaving the country and his air ticket was forfeited as it was non-refundable. He also suffered a loss of income due to his absence from work.

On that night, Sylvia Lim and Low Thia Khiang were also asked to give statements at the CID. On 9 May, Gomez was called again to CID for a questioning session that lasted five hours. Gomez later told the media that he was giving the police "the fullest cooperation."

After three questioning sessions, Gomez was let off with a stern warning by the police who issued a statement stating that the public prosecutor was satisfied that Gomez had committed the offence of using threatening words towards a civil servant but the police decided to release Gomez as he had no prior criminal records. His passport was returned to him and he left for Sweden on 16 May.

=== New cabinet ===
The new cabinet was inaugurated on 30 May 2006. Prime Minister Lee Hsien Loong reveal lineup in which Raymond Lim relinquished his roles as Second Minister for Finance and Minister in the Prime Minister's Office for a new ministerial portfolio for Transport succeeding Yeo Cheow Tong. Minister for Education Tharman Shanmugaratnam was given another role as Second Minister for Finance, while Minister for Community Development, Youth and Sports Vivian Balakrishnan was given a second post as Second Minister for Information, Communications and the Arts as he relinquished his Second Minister for Trade and Industry.

Five new candidates, Lui Tuck Yew, Lee Yi Shyan, Grace Fu, Teo Ser Luck and Masagos Zulkifli, along with three returning MPs, S Iswaran, Amy Khor and Zainudin Nordin, were promoted as Minister of State or Parliamentary secretaries in political office.

Senior Minister of State Balaji Sadasivan relinquished his position as Senior Minister of State for Ministry of Health for the Foreign Affairs Ministry, but remained as Senior Minister for State for the MICA. Heng Chee How took Balaji's place as Senior Minister of State for Health; he relinquished his appointments in the Ministry of National Development and Mayor for the Central Community Development Council. Zainul Abidin Rasheed was appointed Senior Minister of State for Foreign Affairs and Koo Tsai Kee as Minister of State for Defence.

=== Sealing of non-voter documents ===
On June 28, 2006, when Elections Department Singapore announced the opening of inspection for a list of non-voters (those whose who did not vote on polling day and had their names de-registered from the register, under compulsory voting-constitution), ELD announced that two polling stations in Aljunied GRC, AJ24 and AJ25, would be delayed from their scheduled date on November 11. ELD mentioned that the marked copies of the Registers of Electors were inadvertently placed together with the counted ballots papers and other documents by the staff at the Xinghua Primary School, one of the polling stations for that ward. The order was approved by the President of Singapore, allowing those documents to be retrieved from these boxes before being incinerated in Tuas South Incineration Plant a week later on November 17.

Under the current constitution from the Parliamentary Elections Act, all the ballots boxes are sealed and placed in custody inside the vault of the Supreme Court within six months after elections ended, after which the boxes are transported to Tuas South Incineration Plant for incineration, unless directed otherwise by order of the President of Singapore; only a judge of the Supreme Court may have the order to open the sealed boxes and inspect the contents during the time, though it is to institute or maintain a prosecution or an application to invalidate an election.

=== Changes in the Singapore Democratic Alliance ===
A year after the election, the National Solidarity Party renounced their membership for the alliance in efforts of renewing their party's mandate. The party would be led by Goh Meng Seng after he left the WP a year later to join the party and becomes the secretary-general.

In May 2010, just a year before the next election, heated discussions between SDA and Singapore People's Party (SPP) ensues when SDA had brought proposals to include the Reform Party (RP) into the alliance. RP was founded in June 2008 by former WP secretary-general J. B. Jeyaretnam prior to his death three months later, and has since been led by his son Kenneth. While RP had proposed discussions and conditions on joining their alliance, however, a news leak and lack of support by their CEC caused their proposal to fail, resulting in RP declining their offer.

In October 2010, during their subsequent CEC meeting, Singapore Justice Party (SJP) Desmond Lim replaced SPP secretary-general Chiam See Tong as the new secretary-general of SDA, citing that only SPP had agreed on the conditions while the SDA disagreed their decision and subsequently relieving SPP's position. Following months of discussion, the SPP officially withdrew from SDA on 3 March, two months before that election. following the decision by the SDA council to relieve Chiam as chairman, citing frequent "no-shows" at the alliance meetings. As of 2026, the alliance was therefore left with SJP and Singapore Malay National Organisation, and their departures would eventually saw their downfall beginning in 2011.

== Influence of the Internet ==
The Internet played a much more significant role compared to previous general elections. Singapore has a large number of computer users, with 74% of households owning computers and 2 in 3 households having Internet access. Podcasts, blogs, and online political discussions have become common in Singaporean cyberspace. A blog called "SGRally" was set up to collect recorded rally speeches in this election. Opposition candidates had complained about insufficient rally sites allocated to them in past elections.

In August 2005, Singapore Democratic Party became the first political party in Singapore to launch a podcast called RadioSDP on its party website. Several members of the Workers' Party are active in blogsphere; the notable bloggers are James Gomez, Goh Meng Seng and Melvin Tan.

On 25 February 2006, the Department of Political Science, National University of Singapore organised a public forum on politics titled "The (In)Significance of Political Elections in Singapore?" Among the speakers were 2nd Assistant Secretary-General of Workers' Party James Gomez, Nominated Member of Parliament (NMP) Geh Min and former NMP Chandra Mohan. A recording of the forum is available via podcast.

=== Regulations ===
An article in Today newspaper on 18 March 2006 describes the issues concerning political websites during election period. Anonymous bloggers are depicted as faces covered by paper bags.

Regulation of political content online was an issue throughout the election period. The Media Development Authority (MDA) had reminded Internet content providers to comply with the law of Singapore, including those relating to political content. Online bloggers and podcasts are subject to the Parliamentary Elections Act.

In a notification issued by MDA under the Broadcasting Act, all political websites are required to register with the MDA. These websites include those belonging to political parties as well as to "individuals, groups, organisations and corporations engaged in providing any programme for the propagation, promotion or discussion of political or religious issues relating to Singapore on the World Wide Web through the Internet." A MDA spokesperson said that only a handful of websites have registered and that they mostly belonged to political parties or registered political associations.

Political analyst Cherian George noted that the regulation would hinder the development of citizen journalism in Singapore. A number of bloggers and political commentators had noted that the rules are too broadly defined and were unsure how they would be enforced. They protested that this was a violation of freedom of speech. A candidate Goh Meng Seng (WP) refused to register his blog, saying "I don't see the need to do so as an individual citizen. We have our rights to our political views."

In a parliament session on 3 April 2006, Balaji Sadasivan, the senior minister of state for information, communications and the arts, made some clarification on the regulation in response to a question by Low Thia Khiang. Balaji said that podcasting and streaming of videos were prohibited during the election. On the other hand, pictures of election candidates, political party histories and manifestos were allowed to be used as election advertising on the Internet. He added that bloggers who persistently promoted political views had to register with the MDA. During elections, only political parties, candidates and election agents are allowed to advertise. Balaji warned that those who violate the rules would face prosecution, and said "In a free-for-all internet environment, where there are no rules, political debate could easily degenerate into an unhealthy, unreliable and dangerous discourse, flush with rumours and distortions to mislead and confuse the public." The regulation of political content on the Internet had previously led to the closing down of a popular discussion forum website Sintercom in 2001, after the owner refused to register with the authority and voluntarily shut down his website. Additionally, publication of election surveys during the election period or exit polls was banned.
