= Sin Kek Tong =

Singaporean politician

- 沈克栋
- Sin at a nomination centre in 2011

1st Chairman of the Singapore People's Party
- In office 1996–2012
- Secretary-General: Chiam See Tong
- Succeeded by: Lina Loh

1st Secretary-General of the Singapore People's Party
- In office June 1994 – December 1996
- Succeeded by: Chiam See Tong

Personal details
- Born: 1944 Singapore, Straits Settlements
- Died: 27 February 2017 (aged 72–73) Singapore
- Cause of death: Prostate Cancer
- Party: Singapore People's Party
- Other political affiliations: Singapore Democratic Party (1988–1994); Singapore Democratic Alliance (2001–2011)
- Occupation: Politician

Sin Kek Tong (Chinese: 沈克栋; pinyin: Shěn Kèdòng; 1944 – 27 February 2017) was a Singaporean politician. A former member of Singapore People's Party (SPP), Sin served as the Singapore People's Party chairman between 1996 and 2012 and Secretary-General of the Singapore People's Party between 1994 and 1996.

Originally a member of the opposition Singapore Democratic Party (SDP), Sin left the SDP in 1994 with a breakaway faction of SDP members who supported Chiam See Tong in an internal conflict against Chee Soon Juan and other SDP leaders.

Sin and Chiam's supporters then started the Singapore People's Party (SPP), with Sin standing in as secretary-general until Chiam officially joined the SPP in 1996. Throughout his political career, Sin had contested in six general elections from 1988 to 2011, but had never won any of them.

== Political career ==
=== Singapore Democratic Party ===
Sin made his political debut in the 1988 general election when he contested as a candidate of the opposition Singapore Democratic Party (SDP) in Braddell Heights SMC against Goh Choon Kang, a candidate from the governing People's Action Party. He lost garnering 41.2% of the vote against Goh's 58.8%.

Sin contested in Braddell Heights SMC again during the 1991 general election under the SDP banner, but lost to Goh again, garnering 47.73% of the vote against Goh's 52.27%.

=== Singapore People's Party ===
In 1994, Sin left the SDP with a breakaway faction of SDP members who had supported SDP founder Chiam See Tong during his falling-out with the SDP's central executive committee led by Ling How Doong and Chee Soon Juan. After that, he set up the Singapore People's Party (SPP) on 21 November 1994 and served as its secretary-general. In December 1996, Chiam left the SDP and joined the SPP, taking over the role of secretary-general from Sin, who became the party's chairman.

During the 1997 general election, Sin contested in Ayer Rajah SMC as a SPP candidate against the PAP candidate Tan Cheng Bock. He lost after garnering 26.83% of the vote against Tan's 73.17%.

=== Singapore Democratic Alliance ===
In 2001, the SPP joined forces with three other opposition parties (NSP, PKMS and SJP) to form the Singapore Democratic Alliance (SDA). During the general election that year, Sin contested as part of a five-member SDA team in Jalan Besar GRC against a five-member PAP team. The SDA team lost after garnering 25.51% of the vote against the PAP team's 74.49%.

Sin contested in the 2006 general election as a SDA candidate in MacPherson SMC against PAP candidate Matthias Yao, but lost with 31.52% of the vote against Yao's 68.48%.

=== 2011 general election ===
After the SPP withdrew from the SDA in 2011, Sin contested in the general election that year as a SPP candidate in Hong Kah North SMC against PAP candidate Amy Khor. He lost after garnering 29.39% of the vote against Khor's 70.61%.

In 2012, Sin stepped down from his position as chairman of the SPP to facilitate party renewal and because of health issues.

== Death ==
Sin died from prostate cancer on 27 February 2017 at the age of 72, leaving behind his wife, daughter, two sons and three grandchildren.
