= Chua Chu Kang Single Member Constituency =

Former electoral division in Singapore

Chua Chu Kang SMC
- Single Member constituency for the Parliament of Singapore
- Region: Singapore

Current constituency
- Created: 1959
- Seats: 1
- Member: Constituency Abolished
- Town Council: Chua Chu Kang
- Replaced by: Chua Chu Kang GRC

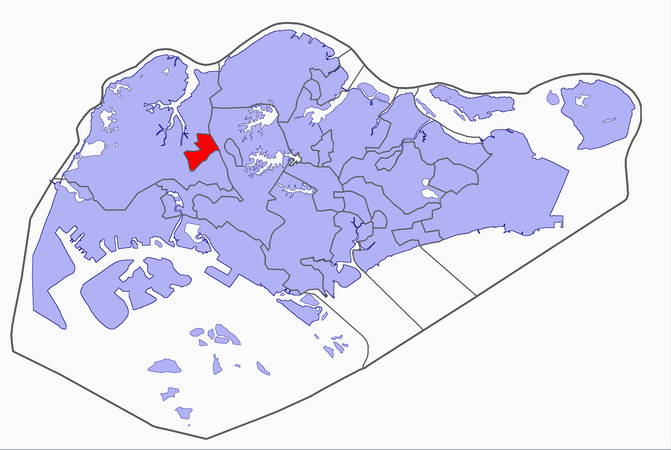
Chua Chu Kang Single Member Constituency.

The Chua Chu Kang Single Member Constituency was a single member constituency (SMC) located in the western region of Singapore. The constituency encompassed Choa Chu Kang New Town. It was one of the longest existing constituencies in Singapore, spanning 52 years from 1959 to 2011.

The ruling People's Action Party (PAP) won the constituency at every election, except in 1963, when it lost the seat to opposition party Barisan Sosialis (BS). In the 1997 general election, the SMC faced a four-cornered fight; Steve Chia from the Singapore Democratic Alliance (SDA) challenged different PAP candidates in straight fights in the 2001 and 2006 general elections. Before the 2011 general election, the SMC and the surrounding Hong Kah Group Representation Constituency (GRC) were replaced with Chua Chu Kang GRC and Hong Kah North SMC.

== Members of Parliament ==
Election	Member of Parliament	Party
Legislative Assembly of Singapore
1959	Ong Chang Sam	PAP
1963	Chio Cheng Thun	BS
1966	Tang See Chim	PAP
Parliament of Singapore
1968	Tang See Chim	PAP
1972	Tang See Chim	PAP
1976	Tang See Chim	PAP
1980	Tang See Chim	PAP
1984	Tang See Chim	PAP
1988	Low Seow Chay	PAP
1991	Low Seow Chay	PAP
2001	Low Seow Chay	PAP
2006	Gan Kim Yong	PAP

== Electoral results ==
Note: The Elections Department does not include rejected votes when calculating the vote shares of candidates. Hence, all candidates' vote shares will total to 100% at any given election (may not appear so in multi-way contests due to rounding).

=== Elections in 1950s ===
General Election 1959: Chua Chu Kang
Party	Candidate	Votes	%	±%
PAP	Ong Chang Sam	3,536	56.3	
Independent	Neo Koon Hin	1,563	24.9	
SPA	Goh Tong Liang	1,183	18.9	
Majority		1,973	31.4	
Turnout		6,334	91.9	
PAP win (new seat)				

=== Elections in 1960s ===
General Election 1963: Chua Chu Kang
Party	Candidate	Votes	%	±%
BS	Chio Cheng Thun	3,753	48.6	+48.6
PAP	Lim Kim Hian	2,429	31.5	−24.8
UPP	Sim Chit Giak	800	10.4	+10.4
SA	Neo Guan Choo	396	5.1	−13.8
Independent	Goh Tong Liang	345	4.5	+4.5
Majority		1,324	17.1	
Turnout		7,799	95.1	+3.1
BS gain from PAP		Swing	N/A	

By-election 1966: Chua Chu Kang
Party	Candidate	Votes	%	±%
PAP	Tang See Chim	Walkover		
Turnout				
PAP gain from BS		Swing		

General Election 1968: Chua Chu Kang
Party	Candidate	Votes	%	±%
PAP	Tang See Chim	Walkover		
Majority				
Turnout		12,879		
PAP hold		Swing		

=== Elections in 1970s ===
General Election 1972: Chua Chu Kang
Party	Candidate	Votes	%	±%
PAP	Tang See Chim	9,002	62.4	
BS	Ng Ah Chue	5,434	37.6	
Majority		3,568	24.8	
Turnout		14,903	95.1	
PAP hold		Swing		

General Election 1976: Chua Chu Kang
Party	Candidate	Votes	%	±%
PAP	Tang See Chim	11,740	68.75	+6.39
WP	Chan Keng Sieng	5,336	31.25	+31.25
Majority		6,354		
Turnout		17,685	97.5	+2.4
PAP hold		Swing	+6.4	

=== Elections in 1980s ===
General Election 1980: Chua Chu Kang
Party	Candidate	Votes	%	±%
PAP	Tang See Chim	Walkover		
Majority				
Turnout		22,363		
PAP hold		Swing		

General Election 1984: Chua Chu Kang
Party	Candidate	Votes	%	±%
PAP	Tang See Chim	13,254	54.8	
WP	Chan Keng Sieng	10,720	44.4	
United People's Front	Teo Kim Hoe	196	0.8	
Majority		2,534	10.4	
Turnout		24,727	96.8	
PAP hold		Swing		

General Election 1988: Chua Chu Kang
Party	Candidate	Votes	%	±%
PAP	Low Seow Chay	11,058	59.3	+4.4
WP	Chan Keng Sieng	7,597	40.7	−3.6
Majority		3,461	18.6	+8.2
Turnout		19,082	97.2	+0.4
PAP hold		Swing	+4.04	

=== Elections in 1990s ===
General Election 1991: Chua Chu Kang
Party	Candidate	Votes	%	±%
PAP	Low Seow Chay	14,489	68.4	+9.2
Independent	Kwek Guan Kwee	5,071	24.0	+24.0
Independent	Harry W. Baptist	1,611	7.6	+7.61
Majority		9,418	44.4	+25.8
Turnout		21,940	96.2	−1.0
PAP hold		Swing		

General Election 1997: Chua Chu Kang
Party	Candidate	Votes	%	±%
PAP	Low Seow Chay	14,141	61.9	−6.5
NSP	Yip Yew Weng	5,040	22.1	+22.1
Independent	Chia Shi Teck	3,210	14.1	+14.1
DPP	Tan Soo Phuan	445	1.9	+1.9
Majority		9,101	39.8	−4.6
Turnout		23,240	96.5	+0.3
PAP hold		Swing		

=== Elections in 2000s ===
General Election 2001: Chua Chu Kang
Party	Candidate	Votes	%	±%
PAP	Low Seow Chay	14,489	65.3	+3.4
SDA	Steve Chia	8,143	34.7	+34.7
Majority		5,643	30.6	−9.2
Turnout		23,936	96.3	−0.2
PAP hold		Swing	+3.4	

General Election 2006: Chua Chu Kang
Party	Candidate	Votes	%	±%
PAP	Gan Kim Yong	14,156	60.4	−4.9
SDA	Steve Chia	9,292	39.6	+4.9
Majority		4,864	20.8	−9.8
Turnout		23,950	95.9	−0.4
PAP hold		Swing	-4.9	
