= Hong Kah North Single Member Constituency =

Former constituency in Singapore

Coordinates: 1.364°N 103.72°E

Hong Kah North
- Former Single Member constituency for the Parliament of Singapore
- Region: West Region, Singapore
- Electorate: 28,071

Former constituency
- Created: 2011; 15 years ago
- Abolished: 2025; 1 year ago
- Seats: 1
- Member: Constituency abolished
- Town Council: Chua Chu Kang
- Created from: Hong Kah GRC
- Replaced by: Chua Chu Kang GRC (Tengah); Jurong East–Bukit Batok GRC (Bukit Batok West)

The Hong Kah North Single Member Constituency was a single member constituency (SMC) in the west of Singapore. At abolition, it was managed by Chua Chu Kang Town Council.

== History ==
Prior to the 2011 general election, the constituency was carved out of Hong Kah Group Representation Constituency (GRC) as a SMC; it had previously been a division in said GRC. Hong Kah GRC was abolished at the same time in favour of Chua Chu Kang GRC. Amy Khor, the incumbent Member of Parliament (MP) for the GRC division, sought reelection in the SMC as the candidate for the governing People's Action Party (PAP); she won 70.61% of the vote against Sin Kek Tong, the chairman of the Singapore People's Party (SPP). She went on to win an increased 74.76% of the vote in 2015 against Ravi Philemon, also from the SPP.

In 2020, the constituency lost its Jurong West section to West Coast and Chua Chu Kang GRCs; in return, it received the remainder of Tengah from Chua Chu Kang GRC. Khor won reelection against Gigene Wong from the Progress Singapore Party (PSP) with a decreased 60.99% of the vote.

In 2025, the constituency was dissolved. The entirety of Tengah was returned to Chua Chu Kang GRC; the remaining estates in Bukit Batok West, alongside Bukit Batok and Yuhua SMCs, were merged with part of the defunct Jurong GRC to form Jurong East–Bukit Batok GRC.

== Member of Parliament ==
Year	Member	Party
Formation
2011	Amy Khor	PAP
2015	Amy Khor	PAP
2020	Amy Khor	PAP
Constituency abolished (2025)

== Electoral results ==
Note: The Elections Department does not include rejected votes when calculating the vote shares of candidates. Hence, all candidates' vote shares will total to 100% at any given election (may not appear so in multi-way contests due to rounding).

=== Elections in 2010s ===
General Election 2011: Hong Kah North
Party	Candidate	Votes	%
PAP	Amy Khor	18,156	70.61
SPP	Sin Kek Tong	7,556	29.39
Majority		10,600	41.22
Registered electors		27,701	
Total valid votes		25,712	97.82
Rejected ballots		573	2.18
Turnout		26,285	94.89
PAP win (new seat)			

General Election 2015: Hong Kah North
Party	Candidate	Votes	%	±%
PAP	Amy Khor	19,628	74.76	▲4.15
SPP	Ravi Philemon	6,627	25.24	▼4.15
Majority		13,001	49.52	▲8.30
Registered electors		28,145		▲1.60
Total valid votes		26,255	97.94	▲0.12
Rejected ballots		551	2.06	▼0.12
Turnout		26,806	95.24	▲0.35
PAP hold		Swing	▲4.15	

=== Elections in 2020s ===
General Election 2020: Hong Kah North
Party	Candidate	Votes	%	±%
PAP	Amy Khor	16,347	60.99	▼13.77
PSP	Gigene Wong	10,457	39.01	N/A
Majority		5,890	21.98	▼27.54
Registered electors		28,046		▼0.35
Total valid votes		26,804	98.52	▲0.58
Rejected ballots		403	1.48	▼0.58
Turnout		27,207	97.00	▲1.61
PAP hold		Swing	▼13.77	
