= Hong Kah Group Representation Constituency =

Electoral division in western Singapore

Coordinates: 1.3425866°N 103.6916102°E

Hong Kah
- Kawasan Undi Perwakilan Berkumpulan Hong Kah 丰加集选区 ஹோங் காஹ் குழுப் பிரதிநிதித்துவத் தொகுதி
- Former Former group Representation constituency for the Parliament of Singapore
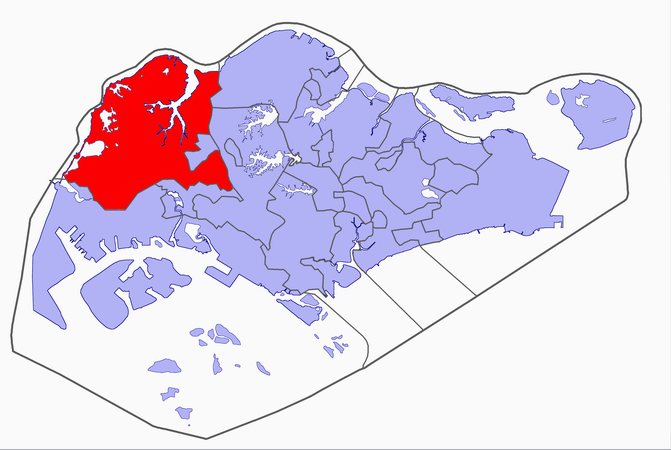
- CDC: Sembawang-Hong Kah (1997-2001); South West (2001-2011)
- Region: West Region, Singapore
- Electorate: 144,677

Former constituency
- Created: 1988; 38 years ago
- Abolished: 2011; 15 years ago
- Seats: 3 (at formation), 5 (at dissolution)
- Party: People's Action Party
- Member: Constituency abolished
- Town Council: Hong Kah
- Created from: Bukit Batok (Bukit Batok West, 1988); Hong Kah (1988); Chua Chu Kang SMC (Lim Chu Kang, 1997); Jurong SMC (Nanyang, 1997)
- Replaced by: Jurong GRC (Hong Kah South, 2001); Chua Chu Kang GRC (Bukit Gombak, Keat Hong, Nanyang, Yew Tee, 2011); Hong Kah North SMC (Hong Kah North, 2011)

Hong Kah Group Representation Constituency was a defunct five-member Group Representation Constituency located in the western area of Singapore. The constituency covered the areas of Bukit Batok, Choa Chu Kang, Upper Bukit Timah, Jurong West and Lim Chu Kang. Hong Kah GRC was formed in 1988 and eventually dissolved and reformed into Chua Chu Kang GRC in 2011. It had always been held by the People's Action Party.

It was divided into five sub-areas namely, Bukit Gombak, Hong Kah, Keat Hong, Nanyang and Yew Tee. In 2001, Bukit Gombak SMC was absorbed into the GRC with the town council being Hong Kah Town Council.

It was one of the largest constituencies in terms of land area, spanning most of the north-western region of Singapore and the coastline of the Straits of Johor.

== History ==
Hong Kah GRC was established in 1988 following the establishment of Group representation constituency (GRC) and Single Member Constituency (SMC).

It initially consisted Hong Kah North, comprising Bukit Gombak and Tengah (previous Hong Kah Village), Hong Kah Central consisting of parts of Hong Kah Village and Jurong East (Neighbourhood 3) and Hong Kah South consisting of Jurong West (Neighbourhoods 4 and 5).

In 1991, Hong Kah GRC was reorganized. Hong Kah South consisting of the Jurong West Neighbourhood 4 and 5, Hong Kah East consisting of the Jurong East Neighbourhood 3 and Hong Kah Village, Hong Kah North compromising of Bukit Gombak and Tengah, while Hong Kah West consists of Jurong West Neighbourhood 7 and 8.

In 1997, Hong Kah GRC was later reorganised. Nanyang (Jurong West Neighbourhood 9) was given from Hong Kah West and Jurong SMC and Yew Tee (Choa Chu Kang N5-N7, Lim Chu Kang) was carved from Chua Chu Kang SMC.

In 2001, Hong Kah East division was renamed to Jurong Central under Jurong GRC. In return, Hong Kah West division was merged with Hong Kah North, and Keat Hong was carved from Hong Kah North, Yew Tee and Chua Chu Kang.

Prior to the 2006 general election, Yeo Cheow Tong intended to retire from politics but was persuaded by Prime Minister of Singapore Lee Hsien Loong to contest for another term that if successfully elected, Yeo would step down from his Cabinet position and only serve as an MP.

In the 2011 Singapore general election, Hong Kah GRC was dissolved. It was split into Hong Kah North of the constituency was carved out as a new Single-Member-Constituency while Bukit Gombak, Keat Hong, Nanyang and Yew Tee wards merged with then-Chua Chu Kang SMC to form the new Chua Chu Kang Group Representation Constituency and Gan Kim Yong took over the ministerial position.

== Members of Parliament ==
Year	Division	Members of Parliament	Party
Formation
1988	Hong Kah South; Hong Kah North; Hong Kah Central	Yeo Cheow Tong; John Chen Seow Phun; Abdul Nasser bin Kamaruddin	PAP
1991	Hong Kah South; Hong Kah North; Hong Kah East; Hong Kah West	Yeo Cheow Tong; John Chen Seow Phun; Kenneth Chen Koon Lap; Harun bin Abdul Ghani	PAP
1997	Yew Tee; Hong Kah North; Hong Kah East; Hong Kah West; Nanyang	Yeo Cheow Tong; John Chen Seow Phun; Kenneth Chen Koon Lap; Harun bin Abdul Ghani; Peter Chen Min Liang	PAP
2001	Yew Tee; Hong Kah North; Bukit Gombak; Keat Hong; Nanyang	Yeo Cheow Tong; Amy Khor; Ang Mong Seng; Ahmad Khalis; John Chen Seow Phun	PAP
2006	Yew Tee; Hong Kah North; Bukit Gombak; Keat Hong; Nanyang	Yeo Cheow Tong; Amy Khor; Ang Mong Seng; Zaqy Mohamad; Alvin Yeo	PAP
Constituency abolished (2011)

== Electoral results ==
Note: The Elections Department does not include rejected votes when calculating the vote shares of candidates. Hence, all candidates' vote shares will total to 100% at any given election (may not appear so in multi-way contests due to rounding).

=== Elections in 1980s ===
General Election 1988
Party	Candidate	Votes	%
PAP	A Nasser Kamaruddin; John Chen; Yeo Cheow Tong	Unopposed	
Registered electors		67,431	
PAP win (new seat)			

=== Elections in 1990s ===
General Election 1991
Party	Candidate	Votes	%	±%
PAP	John Chen; Harun Abdul Ghani; Kenneth Chen Koon Lap; Yeo Cheow Tong	Unopposed		
Registered electors		64,712		▼4.03
PAP hold				

General Election 1997
Party	Candidate	Votes	%	±%
PAP	Harun Abdul Ghani John Chen Kenneth Chen Koon Lap Peter Chen Yeo Cheow Tong	82,182	69.00	N/A
NSP	Steve Chia Patrick Kee Tan Chee Kien Wong Wee Nam Yadzeth Bin Hairis	36,920	31.00	N/A
Majority		45,262	38.00	N/A
Total valid votes		119,102	98.00	N/A
Rejected ballots		2,431	2.00	N/A
Turnout		121,533	96.88	N/A
Registered electors		125,452		▲93.86
PAP hold		Swing	N/A	

=== Elections in 2000s ===
General Election 2001
Party	Candidate	Votes	%	±%
PAP	Ahmad Khalis Amy Khor Ang Mong Seng John Chen Yeo Cheow Tong	96,450	79.74	▲10.74
SDP	Cheo Chai Chen Bryan Lim Boon Heng Lim Tung Hee Sarry bin Hassan Wong Hong Toy	24,513	20.26	N/A
Majority		71,937	59.48	▲21.48
Total valid votes		120,963	97.75	▼0.87
Rejected ballots		2,786	2.25	N/A
Turnout		123,749	95.88	▼1.00
Registered electors		129,073		▲2.89
PAP hold		Swing	▲10.74	

General Election 2006
Party	Candidate	Votes	%	±%
PAP	Amy Khor; Ang Mong Seng; Zaqy Mohamad; Yeo Cheow Tong; Alvin Yeo Khirn Hai	Unopposed		
Registered electors		144,677		▲12.09
PAP hold				

== See also ==
- Chua Chu Kang GRC
- Hong Kah North SMC
- Hong Kah SMC
