= Ang Mong Seng =

Malaysian-born Singaporean politician

Ang Mong Seng PBM BBM
- 洪茂诚

Member of the Singapore Parliament for Hong Kah GRC
- In office 4 November 2001 – 7 May 2011
- Preceded by: PAP held
- Succeeded by: Constituency abolished

Member of the Singapore Parliament for Bukit Gombak SMC
- In office 3 January 1997 – 3 November 2001
- Preceded by: Ling How Doong (SDP)
- Succeeded by: Constituency abolished

Personal details
- Born: Ang Mong Seng; 30 September 1949 (age 76) Johor, Federation of Malaya
- Party: People's Action Party (1997–2011)

Ang Mong Seng (Note: Chinese: 洪茂诚; Pe̍h-ūe-jī: Âng Mõng-sêng; pinyin: Hóng Màochéng) (born 30 September 1949) is a Malaysian-born Singaporean former politician. A former member of the governing People's Action Party (PAP), he was the Member of Parliament (MP) for Bukit Gombak Single Member Constituency (SMC) between 1997 and 2001 and the Bukit Gombak division of Hong Kah Group Representation Constituency (GRC) between 2001 and 2011. He is currently the President of the Singapore Wushu, Dragon and Lion Dance Federation.

== Career ==
Ang graduated from the former Nanyang University and worked at the Housing and Development Board during the 1970s. By 1988 he had worked his way up the ranks to become General Manager of Bukit Panjang and later Sembawang Town Councils.

=== Political career ===
In the 2006 general elections, the PAP had a walkover in Hong Kah GRC. In the 2001 general elections, the PAP defeated the Singapore Democratic Party with 79.74% of the votes for Hong Kah GRC.

Prior to his stint in Hong Kah GRC, Ang represented Bukit Gombak SMC from 1997 to 2001 where he defeated Ling How Doong from Singapore Democratic Party and a third candidate from the Singapore People's Party in the 1997 general elections. Until 2011, he has sat on four select committees in Parliament.

Ang retired from politics prior to the 2011 general elections, and Bukit Gombak ward was absorbed into the newly created Chua Chu Kang GRC while Hong Kah GRC was dissolved.
