= Bukit Gombak Single Member Constituency (1988 – 2001) =

Former electoral division in Singapore

Coordinates: 1.357°N 103.77°E

Bukit Gombak
- Former single-member constituency for the Parliament of Singapore
- Region: West Region, Singapore
- Electorate: 24,909

Former constituency
- Created: 1988; 38 years ago
- Abolished: 2001; 25 years ago
- Seats: 1
- Party: People's Action Party
- Member: Ang Mong Seng
- Merged into: Hong Kah GRC, Holland–Bukit Panjang GRC and Jurong GRC (2001)

The Bukit Gombak Single Member Constituency (Note: Malay: Kawasan Undi Perseorangan Bukit Gombak; Chinese: 武吉甘柏单选区; Tamil: புக்கிட் கோம்பாக் தனித்தொகுதி) was a single-member constituency (SMC) situated in western Singapore. It was established in 1988 and in 2001. It was divided between the three group representation constituencies (GRCs) of Hong Kah, Holland–Bukit Panjang and Jurong. The last Member of Parliament (MP) for the constituency is Ang Mong Seng from the People's Action Party (PAP).

A constituency of the same name was recreated in 2025.

== Electoral history ==
=== 1988: Creation and held by PAP ===
Bukit Gombak SMC was first created for the 1988 general election; PAP candidate Seet Ai Mee defeated Ling How Doong, candidate for the Singapore Democratic Party (SDP), with 53.46% of the vote. While campaigning, Seet washed her hands after interacting with a fishmonger, drawing negative publicity.

=== 1991 : Held by SDP ===
Ling challenged Seet again in the 1991 general election. During a PAP rally, Prime Minister Goh Chok Tong attempted to defend Seet in her handwashing incident during the 1988 campaign, saying that she had washed her hands habitually and not out of disrespect. His comments were reported in the media and reignited the incident.

Ling then defeat Seet with 51.82% of the vote. Seet's defeat was attributed to Goh's recollection of the handwashing incident.

In a 2011 interview with The Straits Times (ST), Seet said that she had wanted to clean her hands before meeting Muslim residents, having shaken hands with pork sellers; a PAP activist attempted to defend her in an ST opinion piece after the election with the same claim. She also wished that Goh had clarified the incident with her before referencing it at the rally.

=== 1997: Held by PAP again ===
During the 1997 general election, Ling stood for reelection in Bukit Gombak SMC. He was defeated by PAP candidate Ang Mong Seng with 65.14% of the vote.

=== 2001: Abolition ===
During the 2001 general election, Bukit Gombak SMC was abolished. It was divided between the three group representation constituencies (GRCs) of Hong Kah, Holland–Bukit Panjang and Jurong.

== Member of Parliament ==
Year	Member	Party
Formation
1988	Seet Ai Mee	PAP
1991	Ling How Doong	SDP
1997	Ang Mong Seng	PAP
Constituency abolished (2001)

== Electoral results ==
Note: The Elections Department does not include rejected votes when calculating the vote shares of candidates. Hence, all candidates' vote shares will total to 100% at any given election (may not appear so in multi-way contests due to rounding).

=== Elections in 1980s ===
General Election 1988
Party	Candidate	Votes	%
PAP	Seet Ai Mee	12,661	53.46
SDP	Ling How Doong	11,024	46.54
Majority		1,637	6.92
Total valid votes		23,685	98.34
Rejected ballots		401	1.66
Turnout		24,086	95.50
Registered electors		25,221	
PAP win (new seat)			

=== Elections in 1990s ===
General Election 1991
Party	Candidate	Votes	%	±%
SDP	Ling How Doong	12,037	51.39	▲4.85
PAP	Seet Ai Mee	11,383	48.61	▼4.85
Majority		654	2.78	▼4.14
Total valid votes		23,420	98.08	▼0.26
Rejected ballots		459	1.92	▲0.26
Turnout		23,879	95.67	▲0.17
Registered electors		24,961		▼1.03
SDP gain from PAP		Swing	▲4.85	

General Election 1997
Party	Candidate	Votes	%	±%
PAP	Ang Mong Seng	15,229	65.14	▲16.53
SDP	Ling How Doong	6,643	28.42	▼22.97
SPP	Syed Farid Wajidi	1,506	6.44	N/A
Majority		7,080	36.72	▲33.92
Total valid votes		23,378	98.15	▲0.07
Rejected ballots		441	1.85	▼0.07
Turnout		23,819	95.62	▼0.08
Registered electors		24,909		▼0.21
PAP gain from SDP		Swing	▲16.53	
