= Seet Ai Mee =

Singaporean politician

- 薛爱美

Member of the Singapore Parliament for Bukit Gombak
- In office 4 September 1988 - 31 August 1991
- Preceded by: Constituency established
- Succeeded by: Ling How Doong (SDP)
- Majority: 1,637 (6.94%)

Personal details
- Born: Seet Ai Mee; 31 March 1943 (age 83) Singapore, Straits Settlements
- Party: People's Action Party
- Education: University of Adelaide, University of Singapore
- Profession: Biochemist

Seet Ai Mee (Note: Chinese: 薛爱美; Pe̍h-ūe-jī: Sih Àiⁿ-mí; pinyin: Xuē Aìměi) (born 31 March 1943) is a former Singaporean politician. A member of the country's governing People's Action Party (PAP), she was the Member of Parliament (MP) for Bukit Gombak Single Member Constituency (SMC) from 1988 to 1991. In 1991, she was made the Acting Minister for Community Development. However she lost her seat in Parliament at the 1991 general election when she was defeated by Ling How Doong of the Singapore Democratic Party (SDP), and has not been active in politics since then.

== Education ==
Seet had her early education at Methodist Girls' School and Malacca High School. She was then awarded a Colombo Plan Scholarship to study biochemistry at the University of Adelaide, where she graduated with First Class Honours in 1964. In 1969, she completed a Doctor of Philosophy in Clinical Biochemistry at the University of Singapore.

== Career ==
Seet worked for the Ministry of Health and the Singapore Institute of Standards and Research, before establishing a medical laboratory practice. After her election defeat, Seet became a Senior Visiting Fellow in the National University of Singapore Institute of South-East Asian Studies. She also went on to co-found the Dover Park Hospice, and served on the boards of several companies, charities and public organisations.

=== Political career ===
In 1988, Seet was elected to Parliament as the MP for Bukit Gombak SMC in the 1988 general election. She defeated Ling How Doong of the Singapore Democratic Party (SDP) by 12,661 votes (53.5%) to 11,024 (46.5%). Later that year, she was appointed a Minister of State at the Ministry of Education and Ministry of Community Development.

In 1991, Seet was appointed the Acting Minister for Community Development. It was widely predicted that she would become the first woman to become a full member of the Cabinet in Singapore after the general election. However, in the general election held later that year, Seet faced a challenge from Ling (as a SDP candidate) again and was defeated. Ling won 12,037 votes (51.4%) to 11,383 Seet's (48.6%). Seet became the first cabinet member to lose a parliamentary seat.

One factor which is thought to have contributed to Seet's defeat was an incident in which she washed her hands after shaking hands with a fishmonger while campaigning in a market, which drew negative publicity. The incident occurred during the 1988 general election campaign, and was brought up again by Prime Minister Goh Chok Tong at an election rally in 1991 when, in an attempt to defend Seet, he said that she had a habit of washing her hands regularly and had not done so out of disrespect. His comments were reported in the media and reignited the incident. In an interview with The Straits Times in 2011, Seet said that she had in fact washed her hands because she had also shaken hands with pork sellers and wanted to clean her hands before meeting Muslim residents. She added that she wished Goh had clarified this with her before making his comments at the election rally.
