= Ling How Doong =

Singaporean politician and lawyer (1935–2021)

- 林孝谆

3rd Chairman of the Singapore Democratic Party
- In office 1987–2007
- Preceded by: Soon Kia Seng
- Succeeded by: Gandhi Ambalam

Member of the Singapore Parliament for Bukit Gombak SMC
- In office 31 August 1991 – 16 December 1996
- Preceded by: Seet Ai Mee
- Succeeded by: Ang Mong Seng
- Majority: 654 (2.8%)

Personal details
- Born: Ling How Doong; 1935 Singapore, Straits Settlements
- Died: 30 April 2021 (aged 85–86) Singapore
- Citizenship: Singaporean
- Party: Singapore Democratic Party (1984–2007)
- Spouse: Toh Siew Ing
- Children: 3
- Profession: Lawyer

Ling How Doong (Note: Chinese: 林孝谆; Pe̍h-ūe-jī: Lîng Hàu-tung; pinyin: Lín Xiàozhūn) (1935 – 30 April 2021) was a Singaporean politician and lawyer. A member of the opposition Singapore Democratic Party (SDP), he has been the Member of Parliament (MP) for Bukit Gombak Single Member Constituency from 1991 to 1996 and the de facto Leader of the Opposition from 1993 to 1996.

== Education ==
Ling was educated at Anglo-Chinese School and Nan Hua High School. He was called to the Bar at the Middle Temple in London in 1972 to practice as a lawyer.

== Political career ==
Ling was the chairman of the Singapore Democratic Party in 1991 when, in a surprise result, he defeated the incumbent MP from the governing People's Action Party (PAP), Dr. Seet Ai Mee, to win the constituency of Bukit Gombak at the general election. Ling won 51.4% of the votes in the constituency to Dr Seet's 48.6%. Ling was one of three SDP MPs to be elected – with the party's leader Chiam See Tong retaining his seat in Potong Pasir, and Cheo Chai Chen winning in Nee Soon Central. The leader of the Workers' Party, Low Thia Khiang, was also elected in Hougang, giving the opposition parties a total of four seats. At the previous election, Chiam had been the only opposition MP to win a seat, so the results were seen as a significant success for the opposition.

In 1994, the SDP appointed Ling to take over from Chiam as the party's parliamentary leader after Chiam fell out with the rest of the party's Central Executive Committee (CEC). Chiam resigned as the party's Secretary-General and was replaced by Chee Soon Juan.

Ling hit the headlines in 1995 after Chiam whispered something into his ear during a debate in Parliament, to which Ling loudly responded "Don't talk cock!" (a Singlish phrase meaning "Don't speak nonsense"). Ling was formally censured by Parliament for using inappropriate language in the chamber as a result of this.

Ling was defeated in his bid to be re-elected as MP for Bukit Gombak at the 1997 general election, losing to the PAP's Ang Mong Seng. Ling won 28.4% of the votes to Ang's 65.1%, with Syed Farid Wajidi from SPP taking 6.5% of the votes.

For the 2001 general election, Ling's old seat of Bukit Gombak was abolished following boundary changes. Ling stood in Cheo's former constituency of Nee Soon Central, and was defeated by the PAP's Ong Ah Heng. Ling received 21.5% of the votes to Ong's 78.5%.

At the 2006 general election, Ling contested the seat of Bukit Panjang. He won 22.8% of the votes, losing to the PAP's Teo Ho Pin who gained 77.2%. During the election campaign, he was threatened with a defamation lawsuit by Prime Minister Lee Hsien Loong and former Prime Minister Lee Kuan Yew as a result of an article published in the SDP's party newspaper. On 24 April 2006, Ling said that he would not apologise as he did not know about the article until it had been published. However he eventually agreed to a settlement and issued an apology for the publication of the article.

Ling stepped down as SDP's chairman in 2007. According to Chee, Ling retired from politics in 2015.

== Personal life ==
Ling was married to Toh Siew Ing and had three sons.

== Death ==
Ling suffered from chronic lung disease and had trouble swallowing. After surgery to insert a feeding tube into his abdomen, he contracted pneumonia and died on 30 April 2021 at age 86. His funeral wake was held at Singapore Casket in Lavender Street on the following day and his cremation was at Mandai Crematorium on 4 May 2021. He was later interred at Choa Chu Kang Columbarium.

== See also ==
- List of Singapore opposition party MPs elected
