= Central Singapore Community Development Council =

Local council in Singapore

Coordinates: 1°17′16″N 103°51′07″E

Type
- Type: Local authority of the Central Singapore District

Leadership
- Mayor: Denise Phua
- General Manager: Lim Sheau Huei
- Seats: 25

Website
- centralsingapore.cdc.gov.sg

District of Central Singapore

The Central Singapore Community Development Council is one of five Community Development Councils (CDCs) set up across the Republic of Singapore to aid in local administration of governmental policies and schemes.

== Constituencies ==
As of May 2025, the Central Singapore district covers:

=== Single Member Constituency (SMC) ===
- Jalan Kayu SMC
- Kebun Baru SMC
- Marymount SMC
- Potong Pasir SMC (Note: Potong Pasir SMC was previously belong to the South East Community Development Council prior to the 2006 election.)
- Queenstown SMC
- Radin Mas SMC
- Yio Chu Kang SMC

=== Group Representation Constituency (GRC) ===
- Ang Mo Kio GRC
  - Ang Mo Kio–Hougang
  - Buangkok-Fernvale South
  - Cheng San
  - Seletar-Serangoon
  - Teck Ghee
- Bishan-Toa Payoh GRC
  - Bishan East–Sin Ming
  - Toa Payoh Central
  - Toa Payoh East
  - Toa Payoh West–Thomson
- Jalan Besar GRC
  - Kampong Glam
  - Kolam Ayer
  - Kreta Ayer - Kim Seng
  - Whampoa
- Tanjong Pagar GRC
  - Buona Vista
  - Henderson - Dawson
  - Moulmein - Cairnhill
  - Tanjong Pagar - Tiong Bahru
  - Telok Blangah

== Results of CDC by election ==
The Central Singapore CDC is among the most populated CDCs among all divisions throughout its lifetime as it represents the most number of elected seats in Parliament. Until 2015, at least one constituency in Central Singapore CDC had a walkover, but the PAP team had elected at relatively comfortable margins higher than the national average, which was first achieved in 2011 (coinciding with PAP winning Potong Pasir SMC since 1984). The Central Singapore CDC holds the highest scoring result out of the CDCs since 2020, peaking at 75.69% during the recent 2025 election.

Year	Constituencies (GRC seats in parenthesis)	Seat composition		Electorate		PAP vote share	
Year	Constituencies (GRC seats in parenthesis)	Total	Contested	Total	Contested	Total votes	Vote share
2001	Ang Mo Kio (6), Bishan–Toa Payoh (5), Jalan Besar (5), Tanjong Pagar (6)	22 / 84	5 / 22	522,683	100,268	68,309	74.49%
2006	Ang Mo Kio (6), Bishan–Toa Payoh (5), Jalan Besar (5), Potong Pasir, Tanjong Pagar (6), Yio Chu Kang	24 / 84	13 / 24	557,321	293,857	177,802	66.10%
2011	Ang Mo Kio (6), Bishan–Toa Payoh (5), Moulmein-Kallang (4), Potong Pasir, Radin Mas, Sengkang West, Tanjong Pagar (5), Whampoa	24 / 87	19 / 24	625,783	486,012	274,266	62.71%
2015	Ang Mo Kio (6), Bishan–Toa Payoh (5), Jalan Besar (4), Potong Pasir, Radin Mas, Sengkang West, Tanjong Pagar (5)	22 / 89	22 / 22	627,470	627,470	424,730	74.39%
2020	Ang Mo Kio (5), Bishan–Toa Payoh (4), Jalan Besar (4), Kebun Baru, Marymount, Potong Pasir, Radin Mas, Tanjong Pagar (5), Yio Chu Kang	23 / 93	23 / 23	635,014	635,014	398,926	66.59%
2025	Ang Mo Kio (5), Bishan–Toa Payoh (4), Jalan Besar (4), Jalan Kayu, Kebun Baru, Marymount, Potong Pasir, Queenstown, Radin Mas, Tanjong Pagar (5), Yio Chu Kang	25 / 97	25 / 25	692,537	692,537	468,628	75.78%

== Mayors ==
The incumbent Mayor of Central Singapore District is MP for Jalan Besar GRC Denise Phua from the People's Action Party since 2014.

#	Name	Start of term	End of term	Political Party
1	Yaacob Ibrahim	1 April 2001	23 November 2001	People's Action Party
2	Heng Chee How	24 November 2001	29 May 2006	People's Action Party
3	Zainudin Nordin	30 May 2006	26 May 2011	People's Action Party
4	Sam Tan	27 May 2011	26 May 2014	People's Action Party
5	Denise Phua	27 May 2014	Incumbent	People's Action Party
