= Choo Wee Khiang =

Singaporean politician

- 朱为强
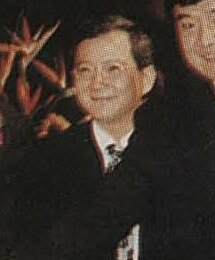
- Choo in 1997

Member of the Singapore Parliament for Jalan Besar GRC
- In office 31 August 1991 – 3 December 1999
- Preceded by: Peh Chin Hua, Lee Boon Yang, Sidek Saniff
- Succeeded by: Lee Boon Yang, Loh Meng See, Yaacob Ibrahim, Lily Neo, Heng Chee How

Member of the Singapore Parliament for Marine Parade GRC
- In office 3 September 1988 – 14 August 1991
- Preceded by: Yeoh Ghim Seng (PAP)
- Succeeded by: Lim Chee Onn (PAP)

Personal details
- Born: Choo Wee Khiang; 1955 (age 70–71) Colony of Singapore
- Party: People's Action Party (1988–2001)
- Relatives: Desmond Choo (nephew)

Choo Wee Khiang (Note: Chinese: 朱为强; Pe̍h-ūe-jī: Chu Ûi-khiâng; pinyin: Zhū Wéiqiáng) (born 1955) is a former politician in Singapore's governing People's Action Party (PAP). He was the Member of Parliament (MP) representing the Whampoa division of Jalan Besar Group Representation Constituency between 1997 and 1999. Choo resigned from both the party and Parliament before being convicted for cheating.

Choo had previously represented the Kallang division of Jalan Besar GRC between 1991 and 1997 and the Joo Chiat division of Marine Parade GRC between 1988 and 1991. Choo was charged with three counts of corruption in 2011 and one of criminal breach of trust during his tenure as President of the Singapore Table Tennis Association between 1991 and 1998 and again between 2002 and 2008.

== Career ==
Choo made his political debut in the 1988 general election where he contested in Marine Parade GRC against the opposition Singapore Justice Party.

During the 1991 general election, Choo contested in Jalan Besar GRC and won with a walkover. In March 1992, Choo caused a controversy when he made a remark in Parliament about driving through Little India and finding the neighbourhood in "complete darkness", "not because there was no light, but because there were too many Indians around there". This had led to calls for his resignation. Choo later apologised, calling his remark a "joke".

During the 1997 general election, Choo contested in Jalan Besar GRC again and won against the opposition Singapore Democratic Party. In December 1999, Choo resigned from the party and Parliament before pleading guilty to cheating charges in court. With Choo's resignation, Prime Minister Goh Chok Tong said the other MPs in Jalan Besar GRC will continue to serve the residents.

Choo served as Deputy President of the Singapore Table Tennis Association (STTA) between 1989 and 1991 and was elected as President in 1991 before resigning in 1998. After a four-year break, he became President of the Singapore Table Tennis Association again in 1998. He succeeded Yeo Guat Kwang as STTA's president in 2002 after being elected unopposed at STTA's biennial general meeting at the Singapore Table Tennis Academy. Choo stepped down as president during STTA's biennial general meeting in 2008. After leaving STTA in 2008, Choo became the general manager of Marina Bay Golf Course.

Choo was also Asia’s representative in the International Table Tennis Federation Development and Continental Council from 2004 and the Honorary Treasurer of the Asian Table Tennis Union from 1991. In 2009, Choo received the IOC President's Trophy from the Singapore National Olympic Committee for his outstanding contributions to the development of table tennis in Singapore since 1989.

== Legal troubles ==
=== Cheating conviction ===
In November 1990, Choo issued a false invoice from his company claiming to have sold equipment worth more than a million dollars to Wong See Kee, Choo's brother-in-law. Wong had used the invoice to get S$830,000 in financing, supposedly to pay for the purchase of the equipment. In 1999, Choo was charged with cheating. He resigned from PAP and Parliament before pleading guilty in court to a charge which was reduced from aggravated to simple cheating. Under the Singapore Law, an MP will lose their seat if they get a year of jail or more than a S$2,000 fine.

Choo's former fellow MP and Senior Counsel, K. Shanmugam, represented Choo. Shanmugam pushed for a fine instead of a jail sentence. Petition letters by grassroots leaders, vouching for Choo's character, described Choo as "hardworking", "compassionate", "selfless" and dedicated to community service. Prime Minister Lee Hsien Loong had said that Choo has done the right thing in resigning from the party and as an MP, before pleading guilty in court.

Choo was sentenced to two weeks' jail and fined S$10,000.

=== Corruption charges ===
From 2005 to 2007, the Corrupt Practices Investigation Bureau (CPIB) received several anonymous complaints against Choo alleging that he had charged his personal airfares, expenses, phone bills to the Singapore Table Tennis Association and received gifts from Chinese coaches and players. The total amount involved about S$10,600. The offences were allegedly committed during Choo's tenure as the president of the STTA.

The CPIB conducted investigations revealed that in 2005, Choo had received S$1,500 from Liu Zhongze, who was then a national team player, and Luo Jie, who was then an assistant coach of the STTA, in return for giving Liu more opportunities to represent the STTA in table tennis tournaments. Between 2003 and 2004, Choo is believed to have accepted US$600 on two separate occasions from Shi Mei Sheng, who was then a STTA coach for approval of usage of two different training facilities in China.

On 8 December 2011, Choo was charged with three counts of corruption and one of criminal breach of trust. Koh Li Ping, former High Performance Manager of STTA, was also involved in the criminal breach of trust charge.

The CPIB said that between 2002 and 2003, Luo Jie, whose work pass only permitted him to work for STTA, provided table tennis training to students of Fuhua Secondary School. But the school was unable to pay him for the training provided, which amounted to S$8,400. Luo Jie told Choo and Koh about this, both of them then allegedly arranged with the school principal to engage STTA in a new training arrangement. The proceeds for the new training arrangement received will be used to pay Luo Jie for the outstanding fees. After STTA received the payment from the school, Koh obtained approval from Choo to authorise a payment of S$8,400 to Luo Jie, even though the latter did not provide any training services under the new training arrangement.

Choo's case was subsequently adjourned to 22 December. If found guilty of corruption, he could have been fined S$100,000 and jailed five years for each charge. The punishment for criminal breach of trust is a jail term of up to 15 years and a fine.

Choo was later acquitted of his charge of criminal breach of trust after the prosecution dropped the three other counts of corruption and proceeded with the criminal breach of trust charge.

== Personal life ==
Choo's nephew, Desmond Choo, has been a PAP Member of Parliament representing the Tampines Changkat ward of Tampines GRC from 2015 to 2025 and later Tampines Changkat SMC.
