= Lily Neo =

Singaporean politician

- 梁莉莉

Member of Parliament for Jalan Besar GRC
- In office 11 September 2015 – 23 June 2020
- Preceded by: Constituency established
- Succeeded by: PAP held
- In office 3 November 2001 – 18 April 2011
- Preceded by: PAP held
- Succeeded by: Constituency abolished

Member of Parliament for Tanjong Pagar GRC
- In office 27 April 2011 – 24 August 2015
- Preceded by: PAP held
- Succeeded by: PAP held

Member of Parliament for Kreta Ayer–Tanglin GRC
- In office 23 December 1996 – 17 October 2001
- Preceded by: Constituency established
- Succeeded by: Constituency abolished

Personal details
- Born: Lily Tirtasana; 12 August 1953 (age 73) Medan, North Sumatra, Indonesia
- Citizenship: Singapore
- Party: People's Action Party (1982–2020)
- Spouse: Ben Neo
- Children: 2
- Education: Royal College of Surgeons in Ireland (MBBS)
- Profession: Medical practitioner

Lily Neo (Note: Chinese: 梁莉莉; Pe̍h-ōe-jī: Niô͘ Lī-lī; pinyin: Liáng Lìlì) (née Tirtasana; born 12 August 1953) is a Singaporean medical practitioner and former politician. She was a Member of Parliament (MP) for the governing People's Action Party (PAP) between 1996 and 2020.

== Early life and education ==
A Chinese Indonesian, Neo was born in Medan, North Sumatra, Indonesia, where she lived until she was 16.

She subsequently went on to complete a Bachelor of Medicine, Bachelor of Surgery degree at the Royal College of Surgeons in Ireland in 1980.

== Career ==
After completing medical school, Neo became a medical practitioner.

Neo made her political debut in the 1997 general election in Kreta Ayer–Tanglin Group Representation Constituency (GRC); the PAP team won in a walkover. She became the MP for the Kim Seng division.

During the 2001 general election, Neo was part of the five-member PAP team for Jalan Besar GRC; they won 74.49% of the vote against the Singapore Democratic Alliance (SDA). She represented the Kreta Ayer–Kim Seng division of Jalan Besar GRC.

During the 2006 general election, Neo stood for reelection in Jalan Besar GRC; she continued to represent Kreta Ayer–Kim Seng after the five-member PAP team won 69.26% of the vote against the SDA.

During the 2011 general election, Neo was part of the five-member PAP team in Tanjong Pagar GRC; she represented Kreta Ayer–Kim Seng again after the PAP experienced a walkover.

During the 2015 general election, Neo was part of the four-member PAP team for Jalan Besar GRC; they won 67.75% of the vote against the Workers' Party (WP). She represented Kreta Ayer–Kim Seng for a fourth term.

Neo retired from politics in July 2020 before the 2020 general election.

=== Positions in PAP and GPCs ===
Neo was Deputy Chairperson for the Social and Family Development Government Parliamentary Committee and Member of the Parliament House Committee and Transport Government Parliamentary Committee.

She was also the chairperson for various Government Parliamentary Committees and the Treasurer for PAP Women's Wing, and supported social measures to support low-income individuals, particularly the elderly and young children.

== Personal life ==
Neo is married to Ben Neo, a obstetrician and gynaecologist. They have two children, both medical doctors. Their daughter, Elaine Kim, is a palliative doctor and entrepreneur. Neo is a Christian and enjoys playing the piano, swimming and reading.

== Notes ==
Parliament of Singapore
New constituency	Member of Parliament for Kreta Ayer–Tanglin GRC; 1996 – 2001; Served alongside: Richard Hu, Sinakruppan Ramasamy, Lew Syn Pau	Constituency abolished
Preceded by Peh Chin Hua; Yaacob Ibrahim; Choo Wee Khiang (resigned in 1999)	Member of Parliament for Jalan Besar GRC; 2001 – 2011; Served alongside: 2001 – 2006: Lee Boon Yang, Loh Meng See, Yaacob Ibrahim, Heng Chee How; 2006 – 2011: Lee Boon Yang, Denise Phua, Yaacob Ibrahim, Heng Chee How	Constituency abolished
Preceded by Lui Tuck Yew; Sam Tan; Indranee Rajah; Koo Tsai Kee; Lee Kuan Yew	Member of Parliament for Tanjong Pagar GRC; 2011 – 2015; Served alongside: Chan Chun Sing, Chia Shi-Lu, Indranee Rajah, Lee Kuan Yew (died in 2015)	Succeeded by Chan Chun Sing; Melvin Yong; Chia Shi-Lu; Indranee Rajah
New constituency	Member of Parliament for Jalan Besar GRC; 2015 – 2020; Served alongside: Denise Phua, Yaacob Ibrahim, Heng Chee How	Succeeded by Denise Phua; Josephine Teo; Heng Chee How
