= Denise Phua =

Singaporean politician (born 1959)

The Honourable Denise Phua
- 潘丽萍
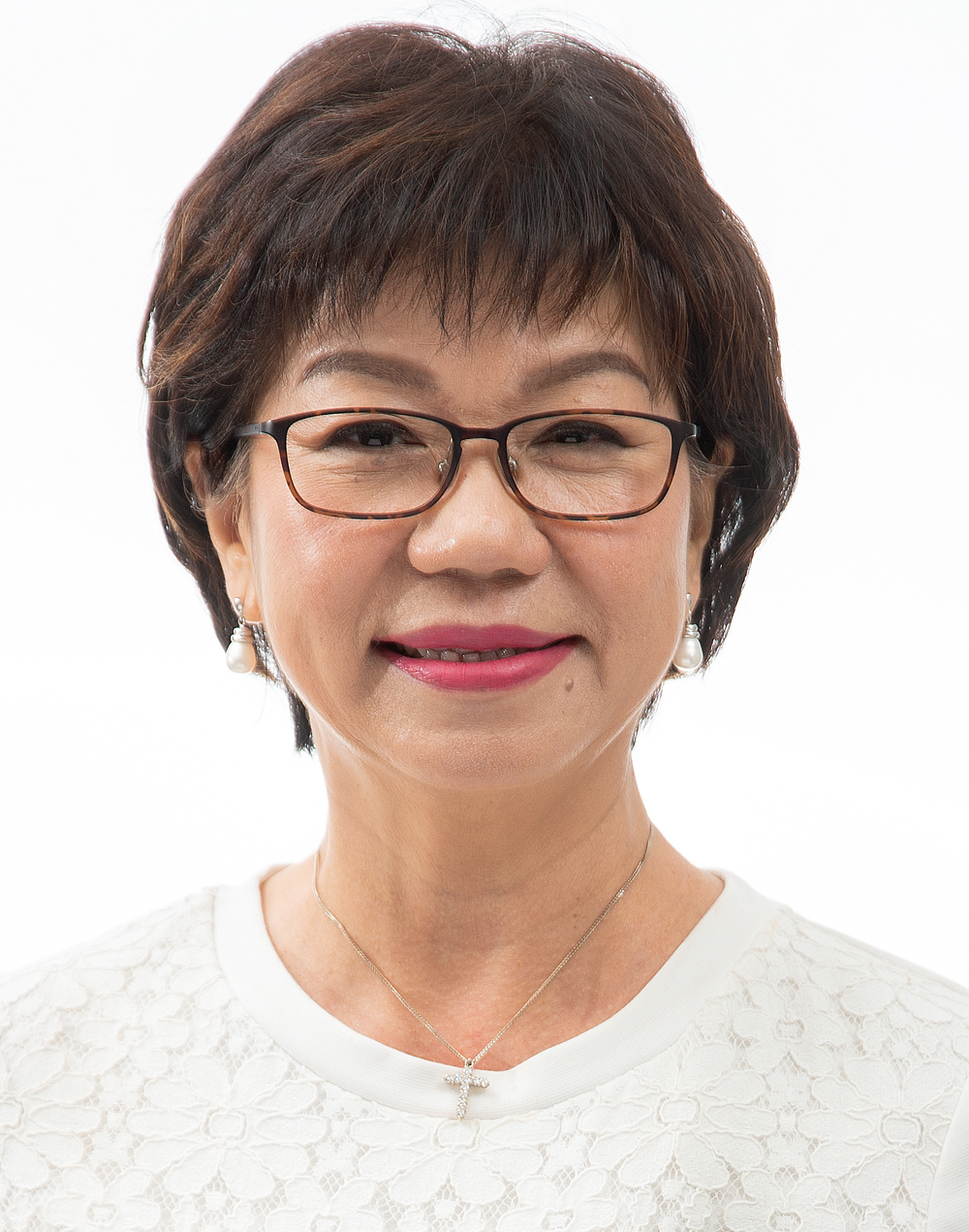
- Official portrait, 2021

Mayor of Central Singapore District
- Incumbent
- Assumed office 27 May 2014
- Prime Minister: Lee Hsien Loong; Lawrence Wong
- Preceded by: Sam Tan

Member of Parliament for Jalan Besar GRC
- Incumbent
- Assumed office 11 September 2015
- Preceded by: Constituency established
- Majority: 2015: 33,342 (35.50%); 2020: 30,370 (30.72%); 2025: 47,335 (50.42%)

Member of Parliament for Moulmein–Kallang GRC
- In office 7 May 2011 – 24 August 2015
- Preceded by: Constituency established
- Succeeded by: Constituency abolished
- Majority: 13,107 (17.12%)

Member of Parliament for Jalan Besar GRC
- In office 6 May 2006 – 7 May 2011
- Preceded by: PAP held
- Succeeded by: Constituency abolished
- Majority: 32,762 (38.51%)

Personal details
- Born: Denise Phua Lay Peng; 9 December 1959 (age 66) Colony of Singapore
- Party: People's Action Party
- Education: National University of Singapore (BA); Golden Gate University (MBA)
- Occupation: Politician

Denise Phua Lay Peng (Note: Chinese: 潘丽萍; Pe̍h-ōe-jī: Phoaⁿ Lē-phêng; pinyin: Pān Lìpíng) (born 9 December 1959) is a Singaporean politician who has been serving as Mayor of Central Singapore District since 2014. A member of the governing People's Action Party (PAP), she has been the Member of Parliament (MP) representing the Kampong Glam division of Jalan Besar GRC since 2015.

Prior to entering politics, she is a full-time special needs volunteer after working in the private sector for two decades. She became the president of the Autism Resource Centre and co-founded Pathlight School.

As an MP, she has focused on developing programmes for disabled people and special needs communities in Singapore. She is a member of both the Government Parliamentary Committees (GPC) for Education and Social and Family Development.

== Early life and career ==
Phua attended Balestier Girls' Primary School, Raffles Girls' School and Hwa Chong Junior College before graduating from the National University of Singapore (NUS) with a Bachelor of Arts degree in English.

She went on to complete a Master of Business Administration degree at Golden Gate University.

In a career spanning two decades, she held management positions at Hewlett-Packard and the Wuthelam Group. She then founded a regional leadership training firm, the Centre of Effective Leadership.

== Volunteer work ==
Phua's son was diagnosed with autism at the age of three. As Phua consulted professionals and did research on how to help him, she thought about how she could help other autistic children. She subsequently founded WeCAN, a charity which helps caregivers of autistic people and offers early intervention programmes for autistic preschoolers.

In 2005, Phua left the corporate world to be a full-time special needs volunteer. She and her partners sold the Centre of Effective Leadership to Right Management, a Manpower Inc. subsidiary. Phua then became president of the Autism Resource Centre. She often wrote to newspapers and government agencies on issues affecting the special needs community. She is one of the architects behind three 5-year Enabling Masterplans for the Disabled in Singapore.

Phua is also the co-founder and former acting principal of Pathlight School, the first special school for autistic children in Singapore. The school offers mainstream curriculum and life skills education to its students. A believer in helping autistic people realise their potential and integrate into society, Phua helped develop many of the school's programmes. These include employability skills training through a student-run café, specialised vocational training, and satellite classes where Pathlight students mix with mainstream students. In four years, enrolment increased tenfold and the school attracted media attention for its impact on students.

Continuing her volunteer efforts, Phua continues to supervise two charities – Autism Resource Centre (Singapore) and Autism Association (Singapore), and two special schools – Pathlight School and Eden School.

== Political career ==
Phua joined the ruling PAP's Jalan Besar branch in 2004. The following year, she was appointed to the Feedback Supervisory Panel, which leads the government's Feedback Unit. In the 2006 general election, she was fielded as a PAP candidate in Jalan Besar GRC, which was contested by the Singapore Democratic Alliance. During the election campaign, she promised to make Singapore a more inclusive society by representing disabled people and special needs communities. The PAP team won Jalan Besar GRC with 69.26% of the vote.

In July 2006, the PAP formed a workgroup, headed by Phua, to explore initiatives to improve the financial security of disabled and special needs children. Phua also led a committee that drew up a five-year plan to improve services for special needs children. The PAP studied their proposals and later implemented some, such as a National non-profit Special Needs Trust Fund. Laws were also drafted to prohibit abuse of mentally disabled people and to allow parents to appoint someone to look after their disabled children after they die.

=== Mayor of Central Singapore District ===
Phua was appointed Mayor of Central Singapore District in 2014 for a three-year term, and was reappointed for the following term in 2017. As Mayor, Phua has initiated many projects to meet the needs of her residents. These include a suite of more than 50 community programmes by the Central Singapore Community Development Council to help residents live a better life, and build a do-good district. Among them are:

- Nurture, a 40-week programme to develop confident and self-directed learners in communications and problem solving;
- In Search of Purpose talk series, to spur residents on in finding their bigger purpose in life;
- Silver Friends, a platform to bring volunteers and partners to serve the seniors through a series of silver programmes; and
- The Purple Symphony, Singapore's largest inclusive orchestra comprising musicians with and without special needs.

== Notes ==
Parliament of Singapore
Preceded by Lee Boon Yang; Loh Meng See; Yaacob Ibrahim; Lily Neo; Heng Chee How	Member of Parliament for Jalan Besar GRC; 2006 – 2011; Served alongside: Lee Boon Yang, Yaacob Ibrahim, Lily Neo, Heng Chee How	Constituency abolished
New constituency	Member of Parliament for Moulmein–Kallang GRC; 2011 – 2015; Served alongside: Edwin Tong, Yaacob Ibrahim, Lui Tuck Yew	Constituency abolished
New constituency	Member of Parliament for Jalan Besar GRC; 2015 – present Served alongside: (2015 – 2020): Yaacob Ibrahim, Lily Neo, Heng Chee How (2020 – 2025): Wan Rizal, Josephine Teo, Heng Chee How (2025 – present): Wan Rizal, Josephine Teo, Shawn Loh	Incumbent
Government offices
Preceded by Sam Tan	Mayor of Central Singapore district 27 May 2014 – present	Incumbent
