= Wan Rizal =

Singaporean politician

The Honourable Wan Rizal
- وان ريزل
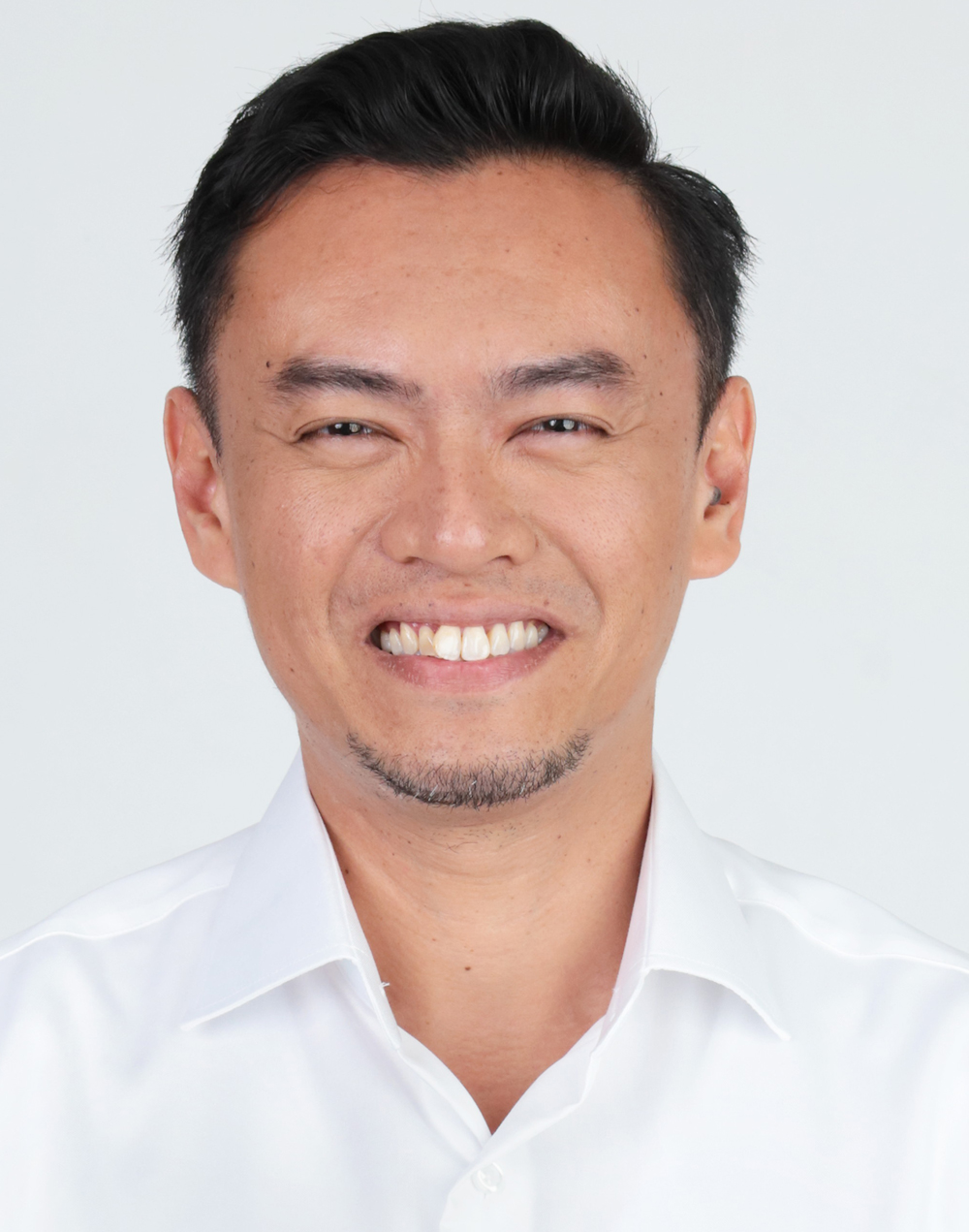
- Official portrait, 2021

Member of Parliament for Jalan Besar GRC
- Incumbent
- Assumed office 10 July 2020
- Preceded by: PAP held
- Majority: 2020: 30,370 (30.72%); 2025: 47,335 (50.42%)

Personal details
- Born: Wan Rizal bin Wan Zakariah; 9 November 1978 (age 47) Singapore
- Party: People's Action Party
- Education: Nanyang Technological University (BS, PhD); National Institute of Education
- Occupation: Politician; lecturer

Wan Rizal bin Wan Zakariah (Note: Jawi: وان ريزل بن وان زكرياه) (born 9 November 1978) is a Singaporean politician and sport science lecturer. A member of the governing People's Action Party (PAP), he has been the Member of Parliament (MP) representing the Kolam Ayer division of Jalan Besar Group Representation Constituency since 2020.

== Education ==
Rizal attended Tampines Secondary School under the Normal (Academic) stream.

He subsequently went on to complete a diploma in electronics at Temasek Polytechnic in 1999, before graduating with a Bachelor of Science with second upper honours degree in physical education from the Nanyang Technological University in 2009.

He subsequently obtained a PhD in physical education from the Nanyang Technological University in 2017.

== Career ==
Rizal served his National Service in the Singapore Civil Defence Force (SCDF) between 1999 and 2003, and attained the rank Lieutenant.

After completing his National Service, he went on to complete a diploma with merit in physical education at the National Institute of Education before working as a physical education teacher at Ngee Ann Primary School and Hougang Primary School between 2005 and 2012.

He was a part-time physical education and sports science lecturer at the National Institute of Education, and an associate lecturer at Republic Polytechnic's School of Sports, Health and Leisure between 2014 and 2015. In 2016, he became a senior lecturer at Republic Polytechnic.

Rizal was the chairman of the Al-Islah Mosque in Punggol between 2011 and 2016, canvassing for donations and overseeing the construction of the new mosque.

== Political career ==
Rizal has been involved in political activities with the governing People's Action Party (PAP) since 2018, after having helped out Member of Parliament Zainal Sapari at his Meet-the-People Sessions for a year in 2017.

During the 2020 general election, both Lily Neo and Yaacob Ibrahim stepped down as Member of Parliament of Jalan Besar GRC. He joined as part of a four-member PAP team contesting in Jalan Besar GRC. The team won 65.37% of the vote. Rizal has served as the Chairman of the Jalan Besar Town Council (JBTC) since 2020.

In Parliament, Wan Rizal serves on the Government Parliamentary Committees (GPCs) for Health and Education. He advocates for mental health, preventive health, and holistic education. In March 2022, he filed a Parliamentary motion on mental health, calling for a whole-of-society approach to mental well-being and enhanced support for those with mental health conditions.

In 2023, he debated on sustainability policies, emphasising the role of communities in achieving Singapore’s Green Plan 2030 targets.

Wan Rizal is also the Chairman of Jalan Besar Town Council. He oversees municipal services and drives sustainability initiatives. He leads the national Action for Green Towns initiative.

As the MP for Kolam Ayer, he has launched community programmes which supports residents living in rental flats, and lower-income families. He also supports the Kolam Ayer Peer Support Network, an initiative aimed at strengthening mental health support at the grassroots level.

Rizal is part of the Government Parliamentary Committee under Home Affairs and Law where he serves as deputy chairman since 2025.

== Personal life ==
Rizal is married with four children.

== Notes ==
Parliament of Singapore
Preceded by Yaacob Ibrahim; Lily Neo; Heng Chee How; Denise Phua	Member of Parliament for Jalan Besar GRC; 2020 – present Served alongside: (2020 – 2025): Denise Phua, Josephine Teo, Heng Chee How (2025 – present): Denise Phua, Josephine Teo, Shawn Loh	Incumbent
