= Whampoa, Singapore =

Housing zone in Balestier, Novena, Singapore

Whampoa
- Subzone of Novena Planning Area
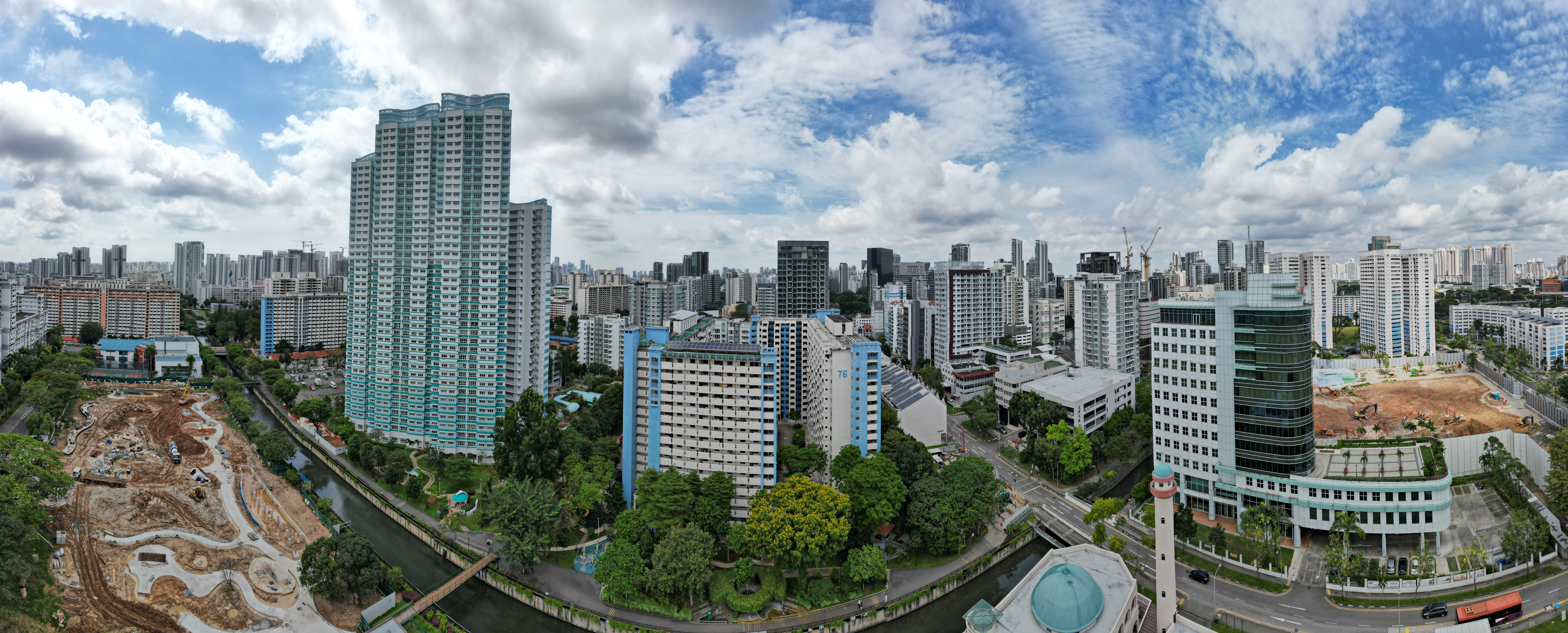
- Panoramic shot of Whampoa. The NKF centre and the Masjid Hajjah Rahimabi Kebun Limau can be seen in the bottom left corner.
- Interactive map of Whampoa
- Coordinates: 1°19′29.38″N 103°51′24.96″E
- City: Singapore
- Region: Central Region
- Planning Area: Novena

Area
  - Total: 131.5 km^{2} (50.8 sq mi)

Whampoa (locally /ˈwɑːmpoʊ/ WAHM-poh) is a housing estate located in the subzone of Balestier, which is a part of Novena planning area in Singapore, as defined by the Urban Redevelopment Authority. Within the context of the Housing and Development Board (HDB), however, Whampoa forms part of the Kallang/Whampoa New Town, together with the various housing precincts located in the adjacent Kallang planning area. This makes Kallang/Whampoa the only HDB new town that encompasses two planning areas, namely Novena and Kallang.

== Etymology ==
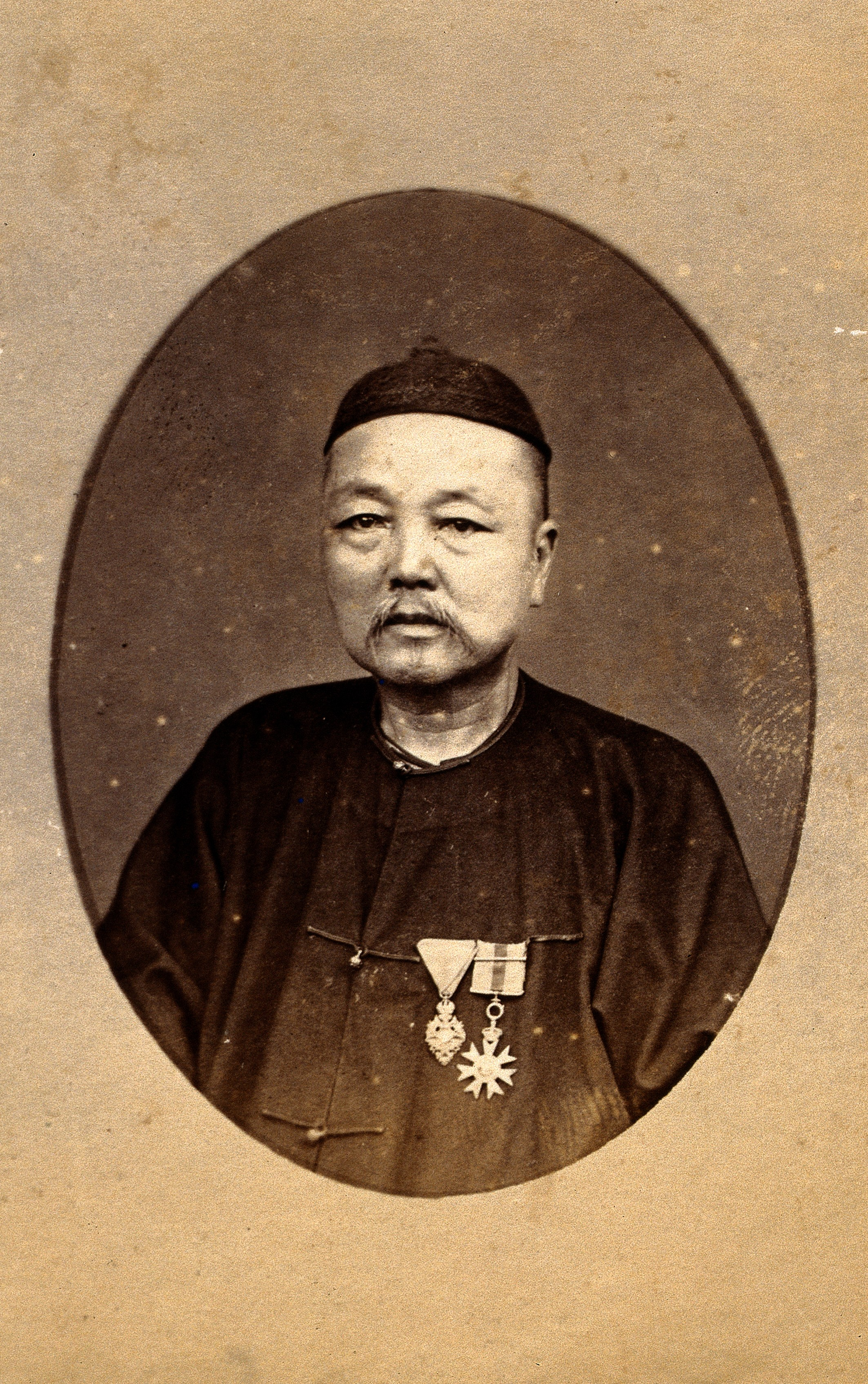
A portrait of Hoo Ah Kay, best known as Whampoa. He received that nickname based on his birthplace.

The name "Whampoa" is the nickname of Hoo Ah Kay, a Chinese immigrant and later a prominent Singaporean businessman and member of the Legislative Council of Singapore who was known for having fluent multilingual skills as well as his contributions to the economy of early colonial Singapore. His nickname is a romanization of the Chinese word Huángpǔ, which is a district in Guangzhou.

== Infrastructure and amenities ==
=== Housing ===
Being a housing estate, Whampoa consists mainly of modern Housing and Development Board (HDB) flathouses. Whampoa is one of the older housing estates and hence some of the flathouses are constructed in an older, outdated style.

=== Eateries ===
Whampoa has several eateries, the most prominent being the Whampoa Makan Place, a large hawker centre which also contains a wet market. There is also a 7-Eleven outlet located along Kim Keat Road.

=== Parks ===
The Whampoa Park is a park located in the heart of Whampoa. It has recreational facilities, for example a playground for children and a fitness area. Historically, there used to be a large park adjacent to Whampoa Drive but it had to be cleared in order to make way for the construction of the Central Expressway.

=== Medical facilities ===
A kidney dialysis centre owned by the National Kidney Foundation Singapore is located along Kim Keat Road. There is also a clinic known as Whampoa Clinic located at Block 88 of the Whampoa Drive area.

=== Religious sites ===
Whampoa has a few religious sites. The Goh Chor Tua Pek Kong Temple, a temple dedicated to the Chinese deity Tua Pek Kong, was established in 1847 by Hokkien immigrants and then renovated between 1920–1928. For the Muslims, there is only one mosque, Masjid Hajjah Rahimabi Kebun Limau, situated along Kim Keat Road, built in 1984 to replace a smaller mosque.

=== Landmarks ===
==== Flora and Fauna ====
At some point of time, Whampoa became known for having lime plantations. This resulted in a small two-storey mosque in Whampoa having the name Kebun Limau which means "lime fruit plantations" in Malay.

==== Whampoa Dragon Fountain ====
The Whampoa Dragon Fountain is a fountain with a sculpture of a large Chinese dragon was completed in 1973. The fountain is the only remaining portion of a large park that was cleared for the development of the Central Expressway.

== Gallery ==
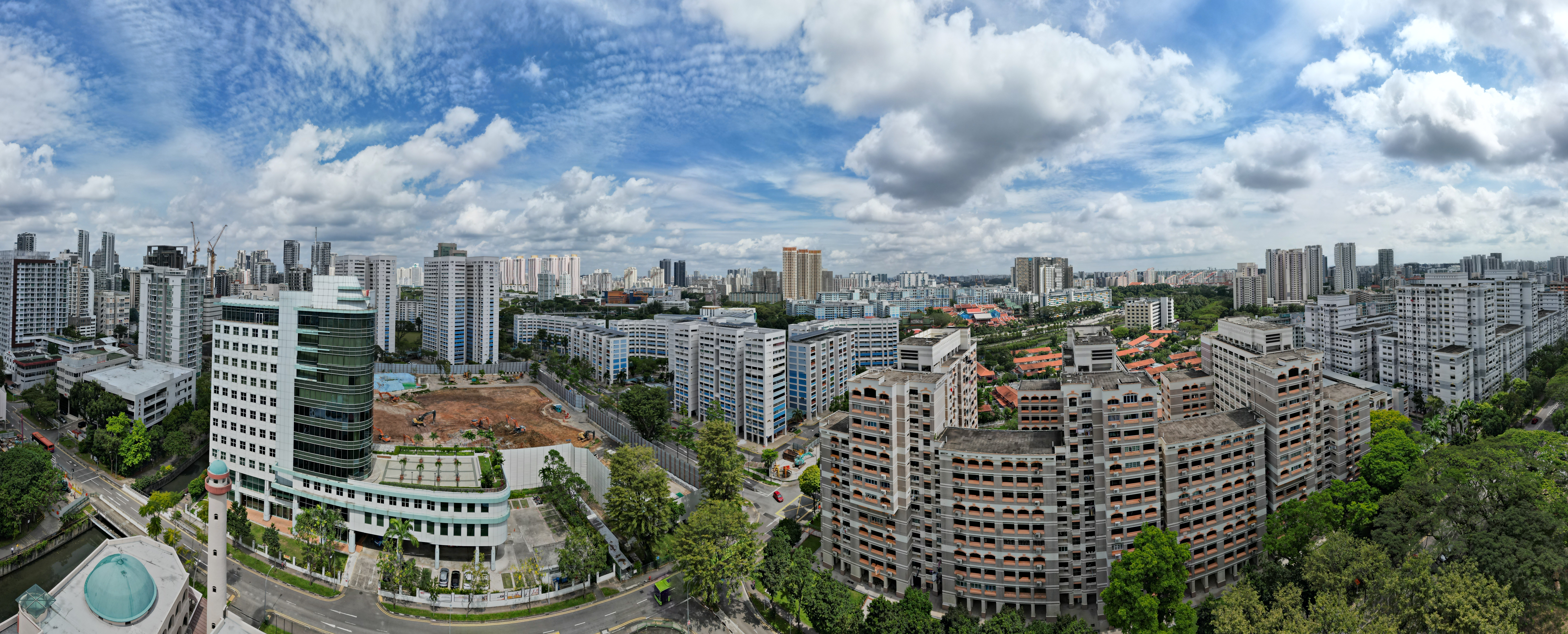
A panorama of Whampoa, taken in 2023. The NKF dialysis centre and Masjid Hajjah Rahimabi Kebun Limau are visible in the lower left bottom of the image.

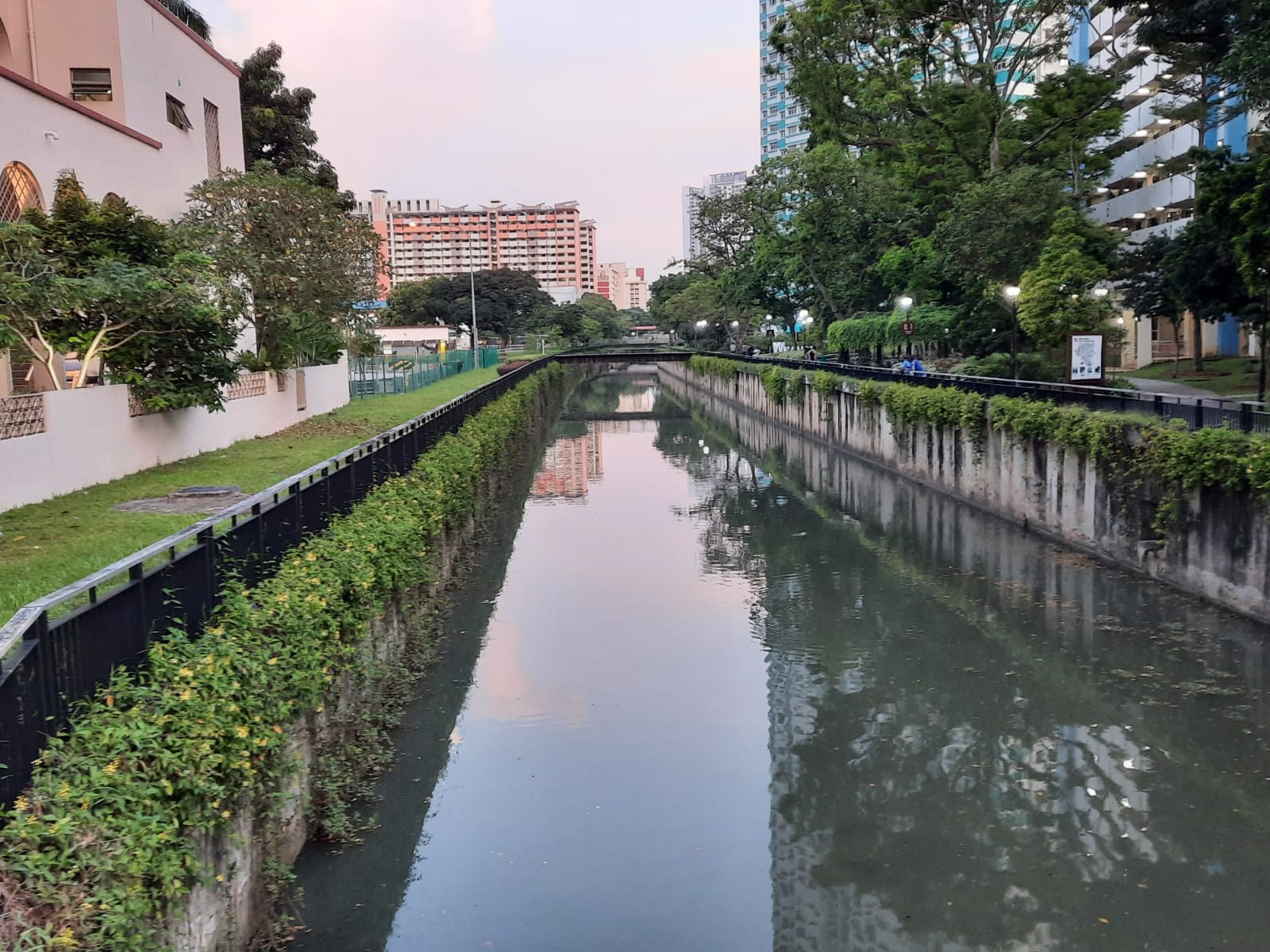
A view of the Whampoa River that flows throughout the neighborhood.

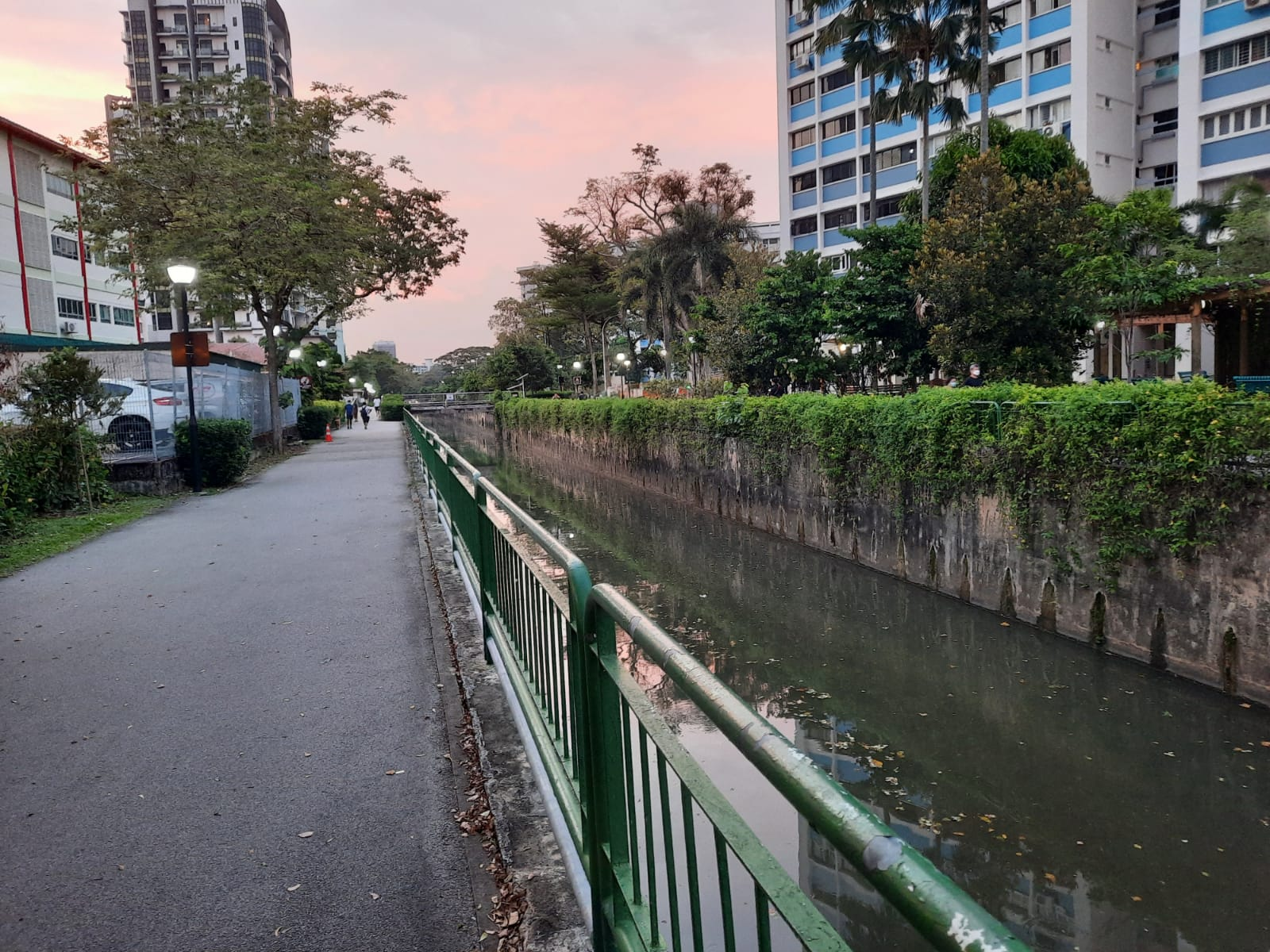
Another view of the Whampoa River during evening.

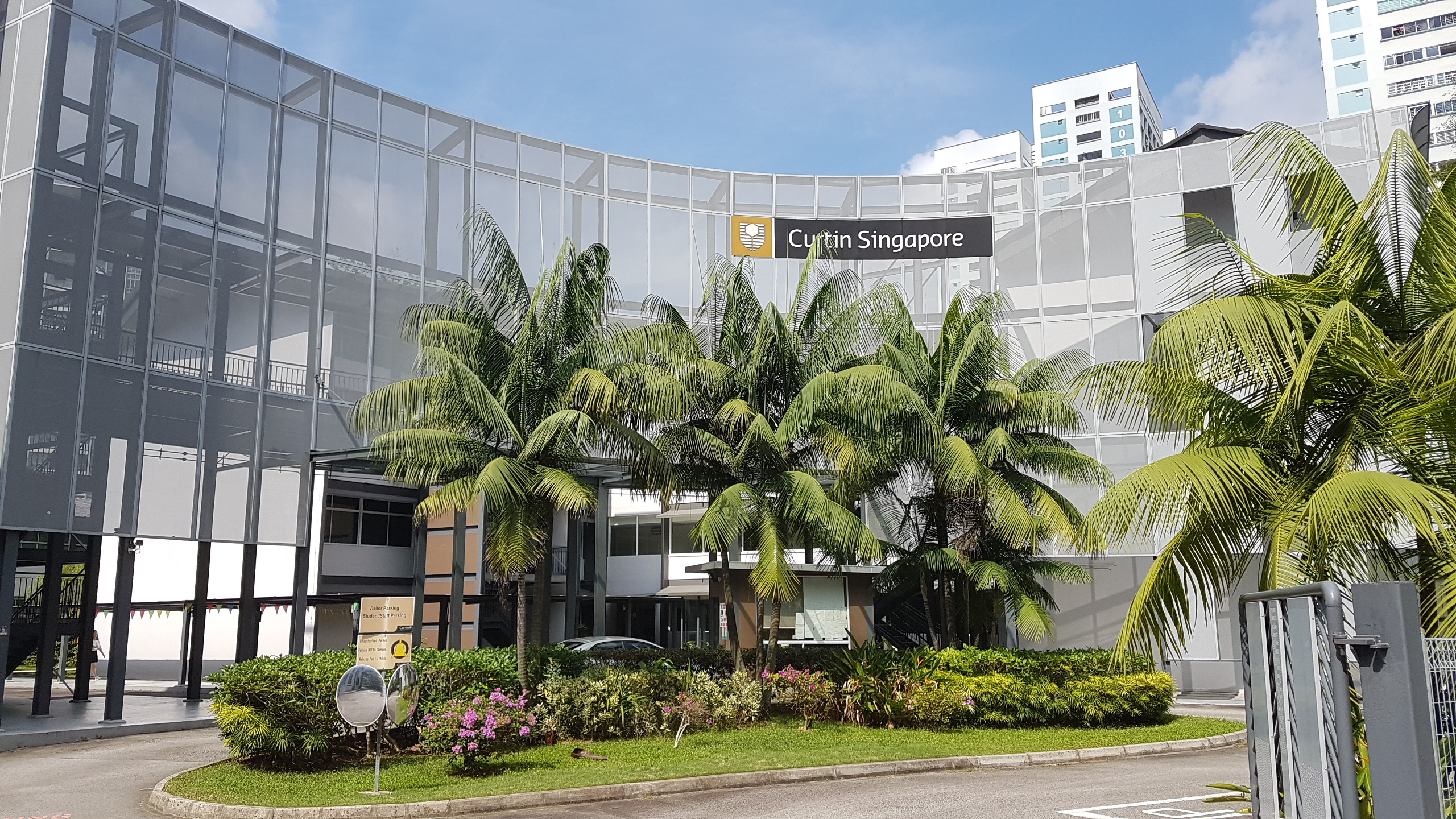
Curtain Singapore building in Whampoa.

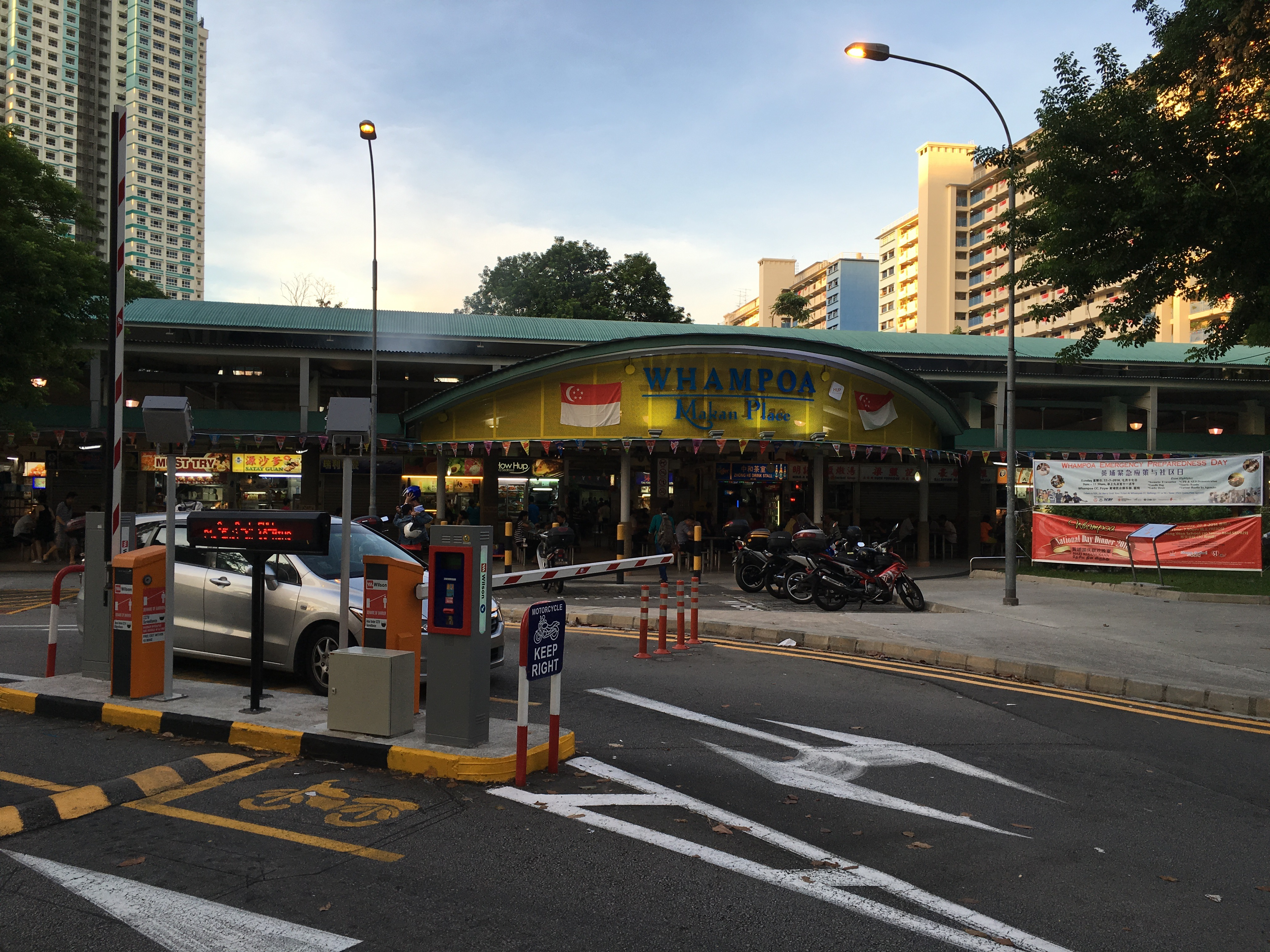
Whampoa Makan Place

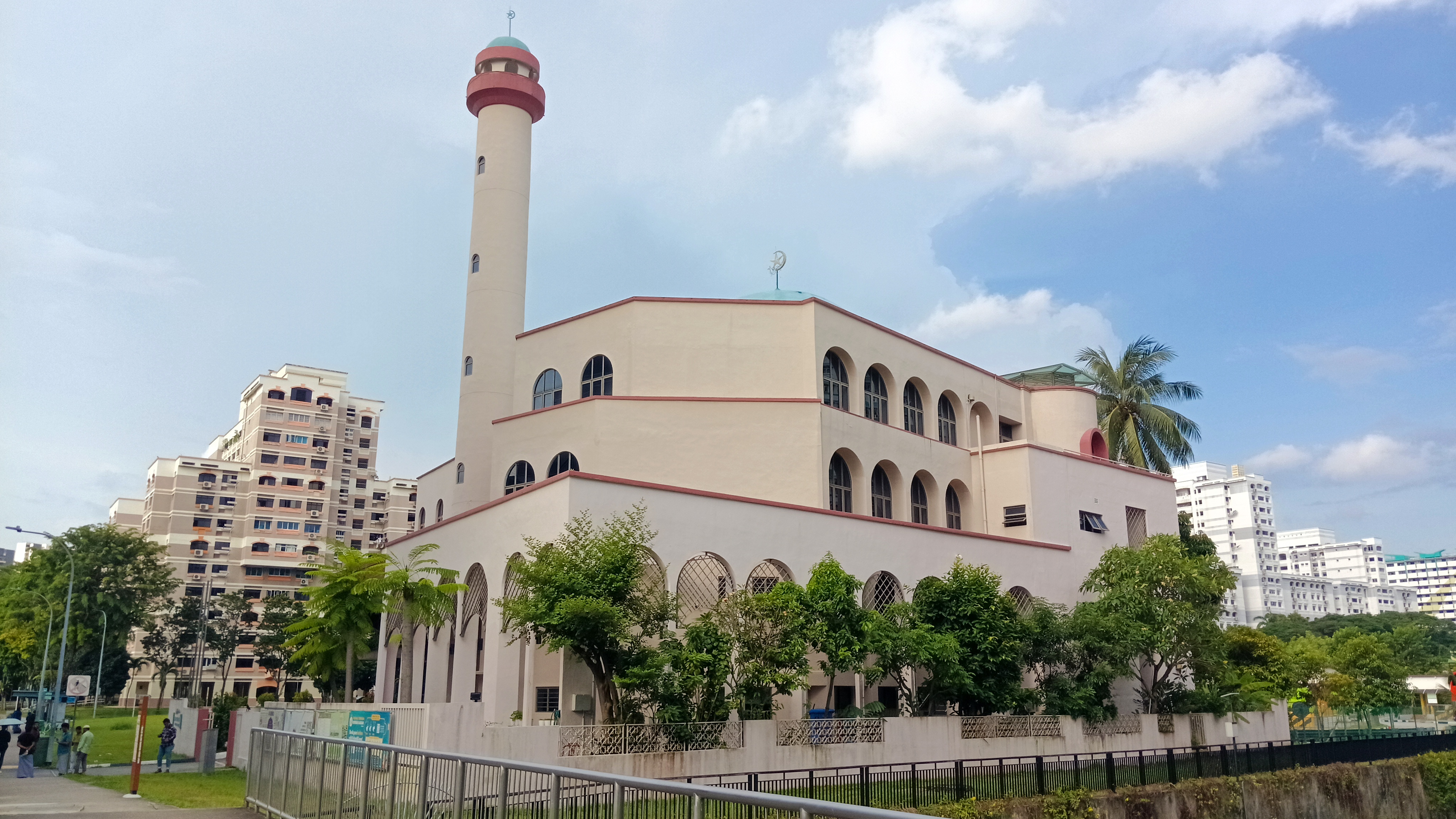
Masjid Hajjah Rahimabi Kebun Limau

== Politics ==
The Whampoa area has been part of Jalan Besar GRC since 1997, though the area was carved out as its Whampoa SMC between 2011 and 2015. The current Member of Parliament (MP) is Shawn Loh.
