= Whampoa Dragon Fountain =

Former fountain and statue in Singapore

Coordinates: 1.3226°N 103.8545°E

The Whampoa Dragon Fountain is a former fountain and a statue of a dragon in Whampoa, Singapore. The statue is located along the CTE.

== History ==
Plans to construct the fountain were first announced in March 1973, as one of several dragon structures built in Singapore around that time. The fountain was completed in late 1973, and was originally situated in a playground in a large park behind Block 85 in Whampoa, Singapore. The dragon structure was made from broke China rice bowls.

However, in 1985, both the playground and the park were removed due to the construction of the CTE, which ran through the former site of the park and the playground. The structure stopped functioning as a fountain somewhere after the 1980s, and has weathered. The fountain basin was later covered by bushes. Anti-algae treatment has also been applied to the structure.
