= Whampoa Makan Place =

Wet market and food centre in Singapore

Coordinates: 1.3232°N 103.8523°E

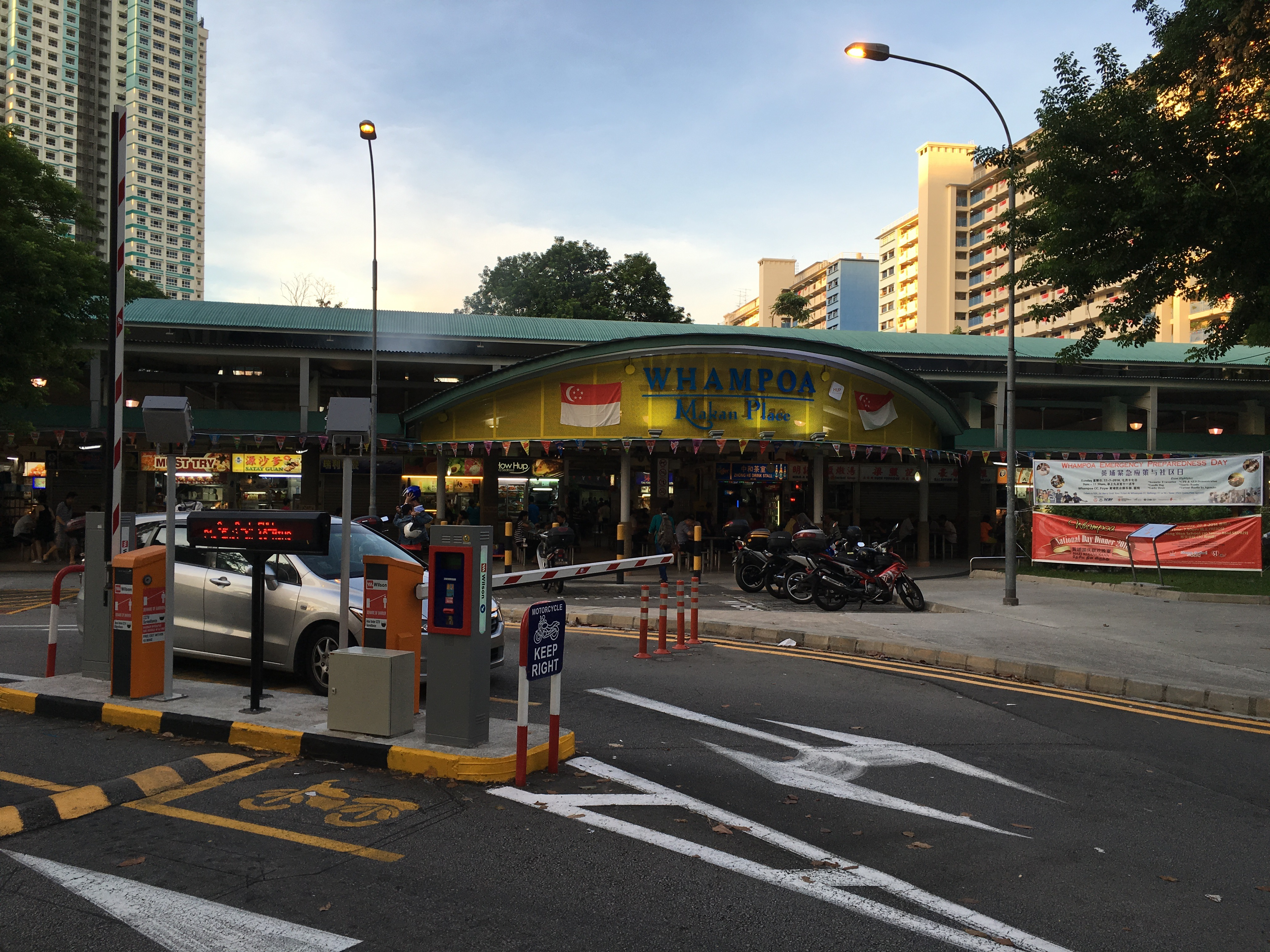
Whampoa Makan Place

Whampoa Makan Place is a hawker centre and wet market on blocks 90, 91 and 92 along Whampoa Drive in Whampoa, Singapore. The centre is divided into two sections, with one being the hawker centre, and the other being the wet market. It was opened in 1973, replacing the earlier Rayman Market.

== History ==
=== Rayman Market ===
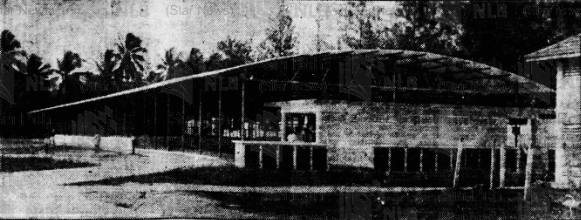
Rayman Market on its completion in 1952.

The Municipal Special Markets Committee had begun considering the construction of a market off Balestier Road to serve the Rayman housing estate by 1949 "as an experiment." However, the committee felt that the need for a market serving the Tiong Bahru area was greater and so the construction of the Seng Poh Road Market was prioritised instead. Construction, began in December 1951, with the hawkers who had previously occupied the site being given until 2 December to vacate the space. The market was to be completed by the middle of the following year, and it was to house the displaced hawkers. Half of the market was to sell fish and meat while the other half was to sell vegetables, fruits and eggs. The tenants were to be given the "lowest possible pitch rentals". The market opened in November 1952 with 173 pitches and stalls. The building was reportedly similar in structure to the Seng Poh Road Market, though it was cheaper to construct, costing $235,000.

In March 1971, Chua Sian Chin, then the Minister for Health, confirmed that the market would be demolished following the construction of a newer market in the area. It was demolished in 1973 along with the opening of Whampoa Market.

=== Whampoa Makan Place ===
The hawker centre, initially known as Whampoa Market and Food Centre, was opened in 1973, replacing Rayman Market. The food centre went under renovation in 2016, and was upgraded in 2007, being renamed as the Whampoa Makan Place. The food centre is also known for some of its stalls, such as Balestier Road Hoover Rojak, Beach Road Fish Head Bee Hoon, Huat Heng Fried Oyster and Liang Zhao Ji Duck Rice, all of which have been awarded the Michelin Bib Gourmand award. The market was included in the Balestier Heritage Trail in 2018.

On 12 February 2017, a fire broke out in the Hi Leskmi Nasi Lemak stall in the food centre. The fire was extinguished by members of the public before firefighters arrived, and no one was injured.

The food centre was temporarily closed on 22 July 2021, along with the Clementi 448 Market, as COVID-19 clusters at the food centres were linked to a COVID-19 cluster at the Jurong Port Fishery. The food centre was reopened on 6 August 2021, after deep cleaning and disinfection.

The market was named after Hoo Ah Kay, a Chinese merchant who was commonly known as Whampoa.
