= Masjid Hajjah Rahimabi Kebun Limau =

Mosque located in Balestier, Singapore

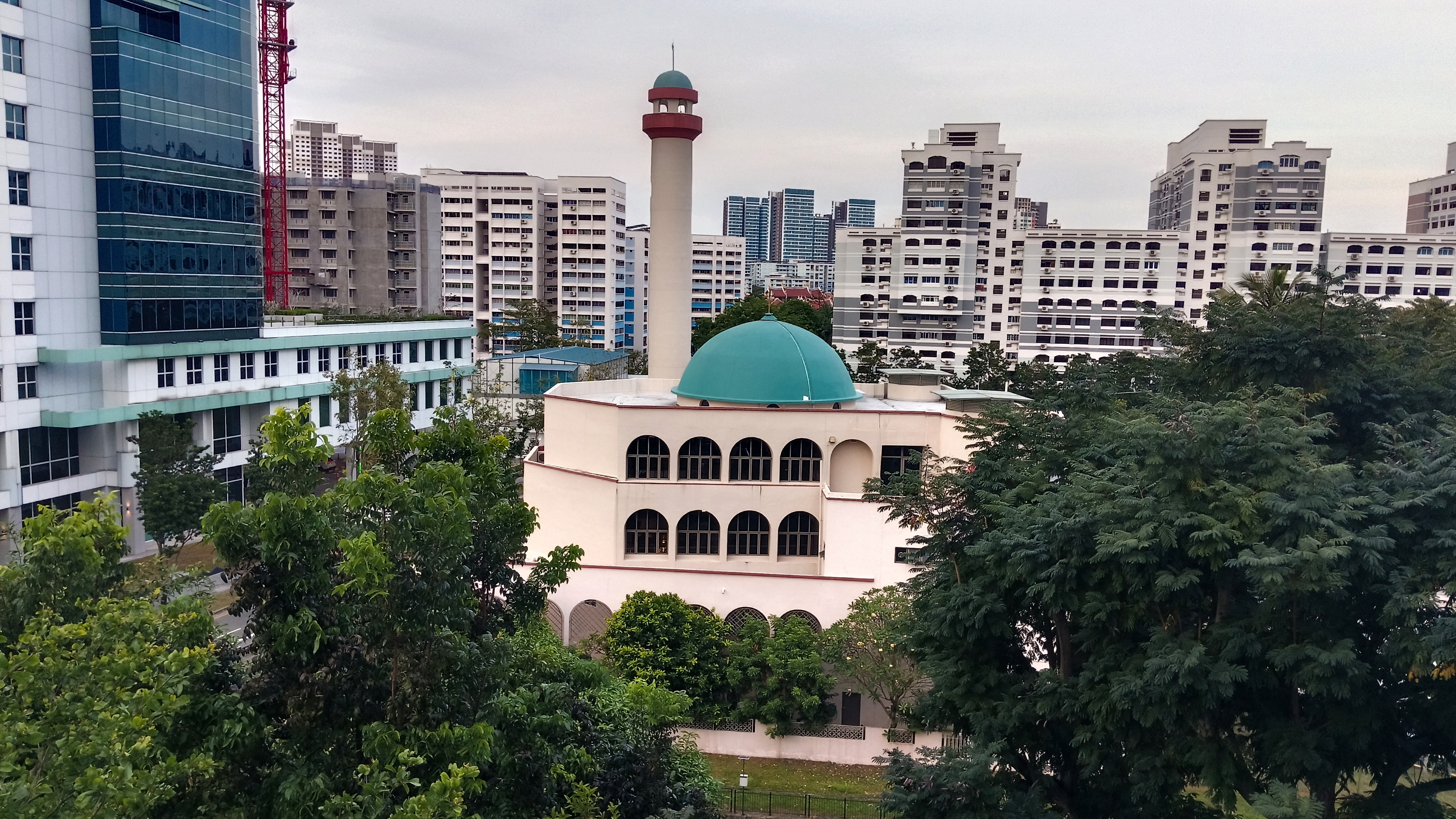
- Aerial view of the mosque.

- Location in Singapore

Religion
- Affiliation: Sunni Islam

Location
- Location: 76 Kim Keat Road, Singapore 328835
- Country: Singapore
- Interactive map of Masjid Hajjah Rahimabi Kebun Limau
- Coordinates: 1.3261163°N 103.8547991°E

Architecture
- Type: Mosque
- Style: Ottoman architecture
- Completed: 1959; 67 years ago (Surau); 1974; 52 years ago (Mosque); 1984; 42 years ago (Current structure)

Specifications
- Dome: 1
- Minaret: 1

Masjid Hajjah Rahimabi Kebun Limau, formerly called Masjid Kebun Limau, is a mosque located in the Whampoa neighbourhood within Balestier, Singapore. Originating as a surau that was built in 1959, the surau was rebuilt into a mosque in 1974, while the present-day structure is a 1984 reconstruction. The mosque derives the first part of its name from Hajjah Rahima Bee, who funded the latest reconstruction of the mosque; while the second part of its name is derived from the area the mosque is built in, which was formerly near a lime plantation ("kebun limau").

== History ==
The original structure at the site was a surau, built in 1959 to serve the Muslims working at the nearby lime plantation, known as kebun limau ("lime plantation"). Then in 1974, the surau was rebuilt into a full-fledged mosque. The mosque would be overcrowded during the Friday prayers as well as festive prayers such as during Eid al-Adha, hence in 1977 the mosque committee made attempts to expand the spaces for prayers in the mosque. Due to these issues, the Majlis Ugama Islam Singapura announced that Masjid Kebun Limau would be reconstructed completely to increase its capacity and serve more worshippers.

In 1976, Hajjah Rahima Bee, a philanthropist from the Angullia family donated a large sum of money in memory of her late daughter, which massively helped to fund the mosque's reconstruction. The donation was also made to continue her family's legacy of building mosques; her grandfather had built the Masjid Angullia at Little India, while her father had built Masjid Al-Falah at Somerset. The rebuilt mosque was completed in 1984, although it was unable to host religious classes at the time due to its insufficient funds.

Due to being situated a street opposite the NKF Centre, the mosque has often collaborated with the National Kidney Foundation Singapore to spread awareness on kidney diseases and dialysis.

== Architecture ==
The mosque is built on the riverbank of the Whampoa River. The interior of the mosque has batik-inspired decorative elements, such as carvings around the mihrab and minbar in the main prayer hall, as well as calligraphic murals. The exterior of the mosque is inspired by traditional Islamic architecture, especially from the Ottoman era, but with a modern spin on it. A large blue dome tops the main prayer hall, while an edge of the building is flanked by a minaret.

== Gallery ==
=== Interior ===
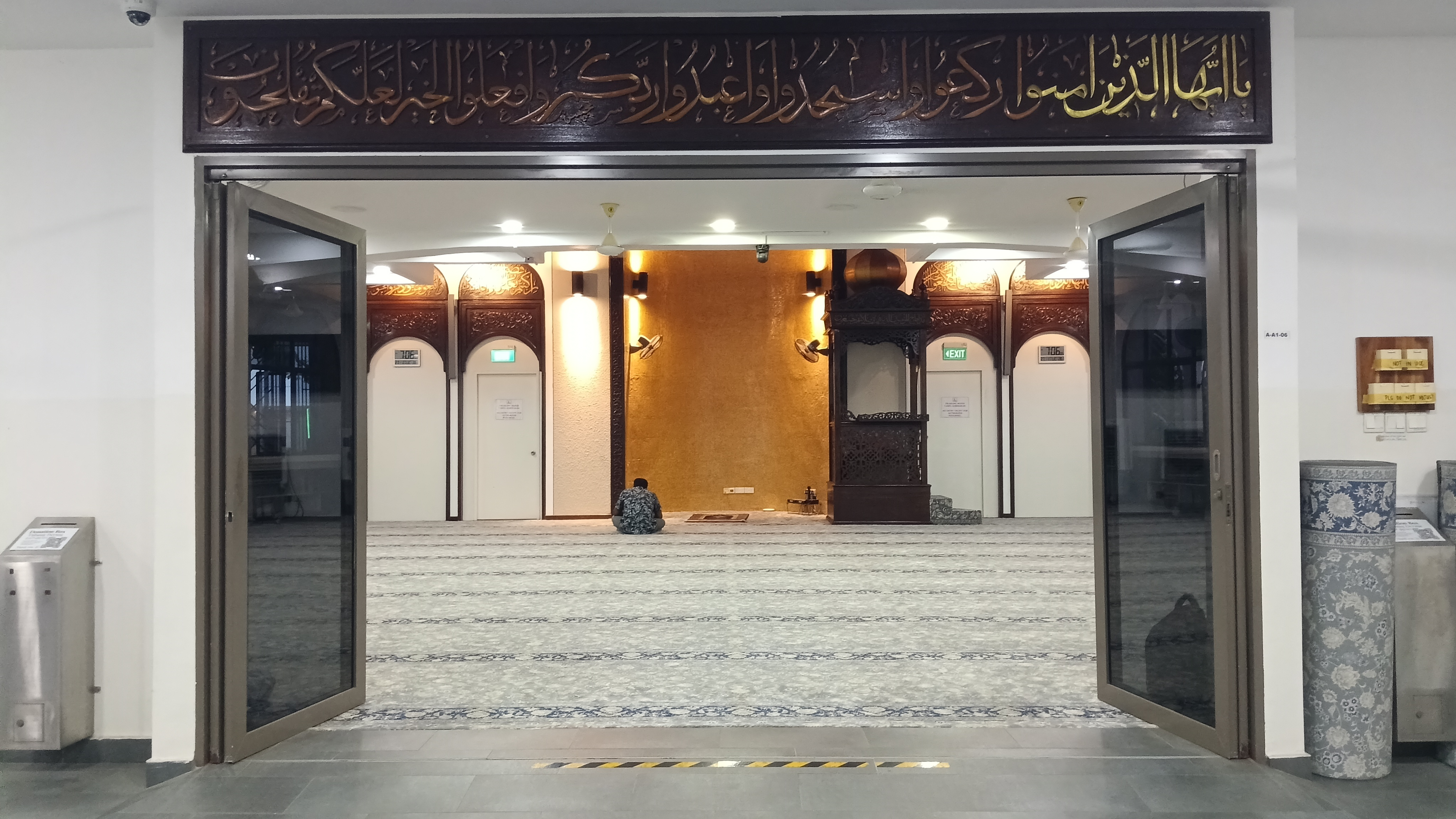
Entrance to the main prayer hall

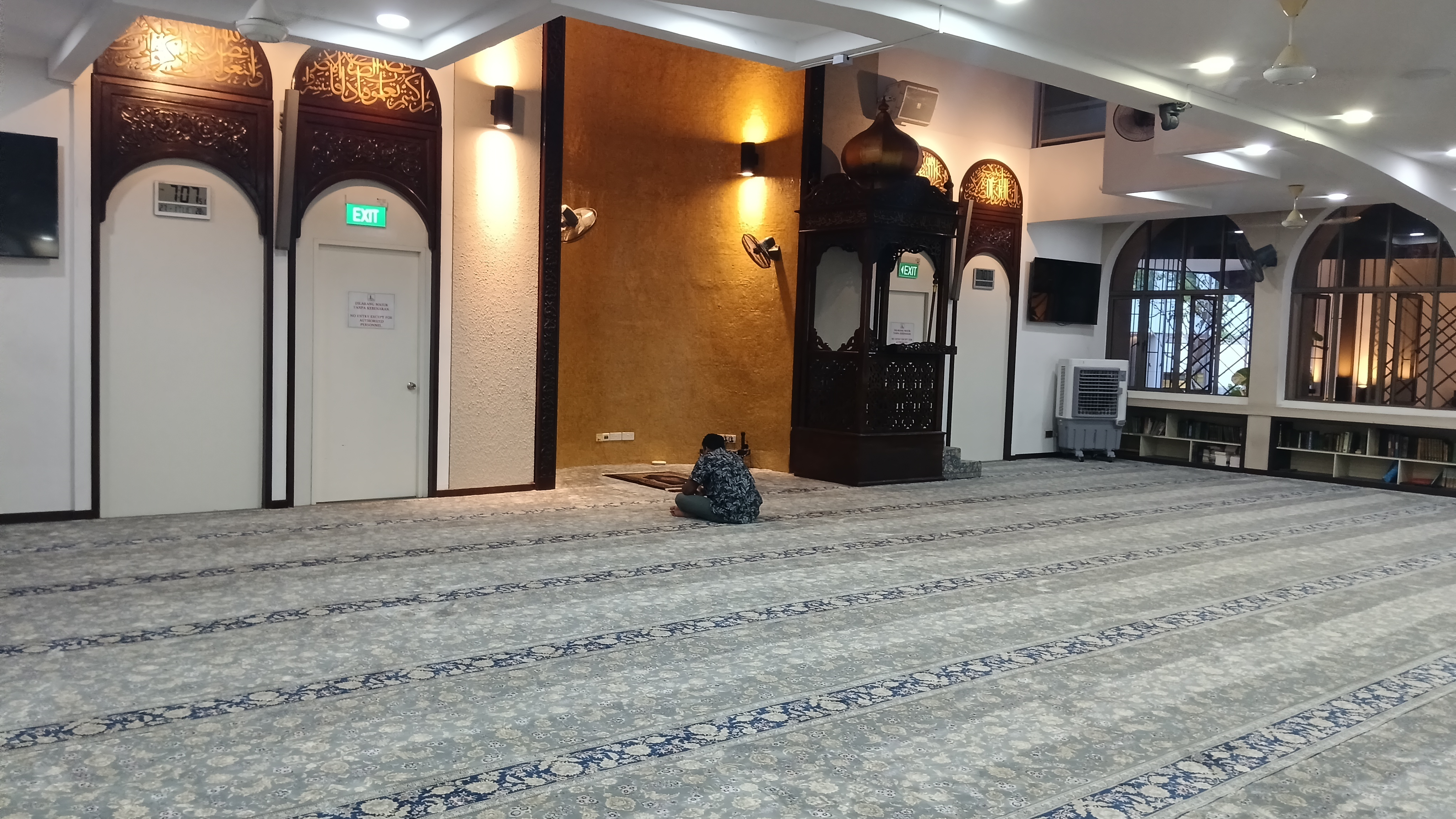
Inside the main prayer hall

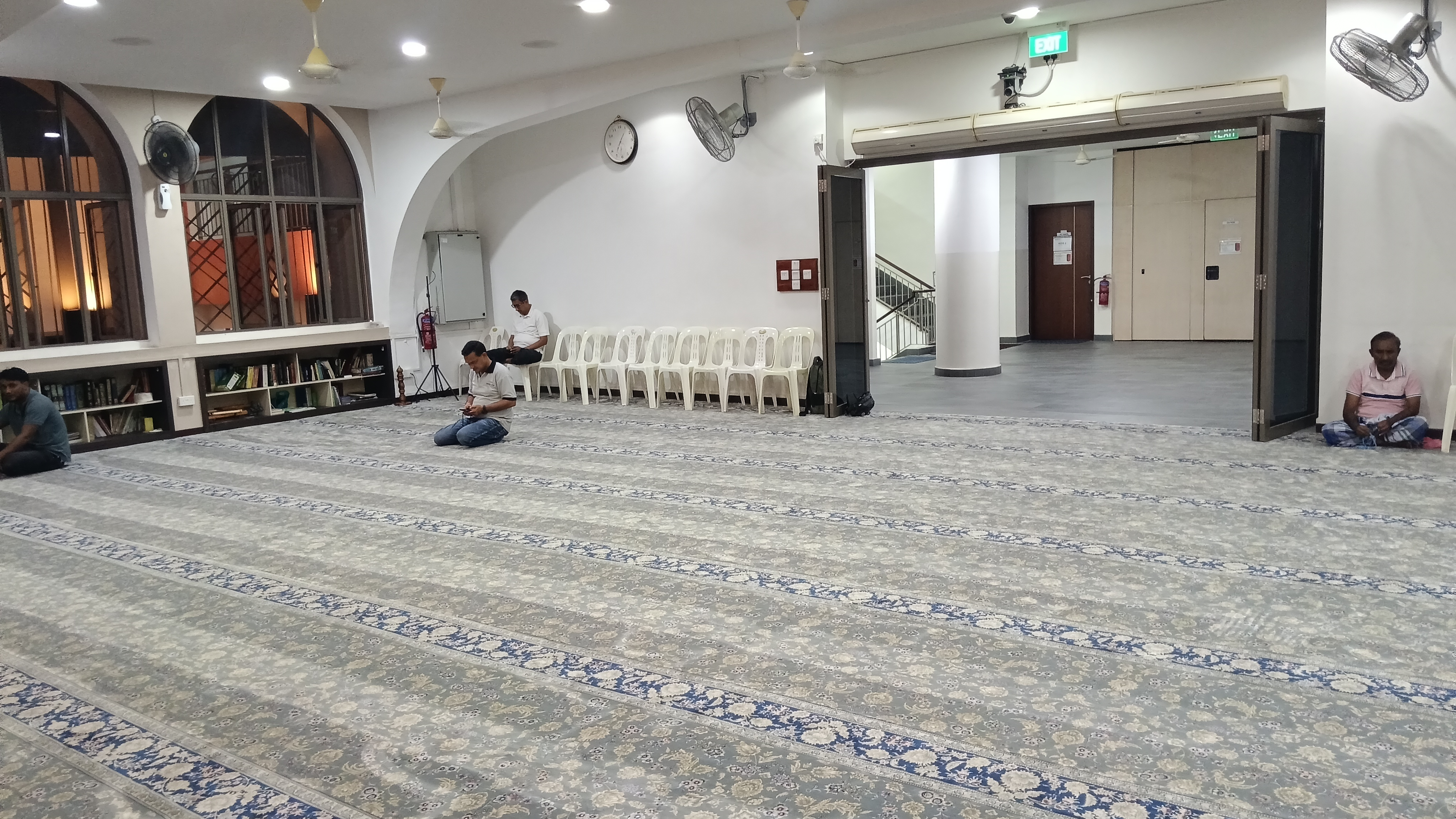
Ditto

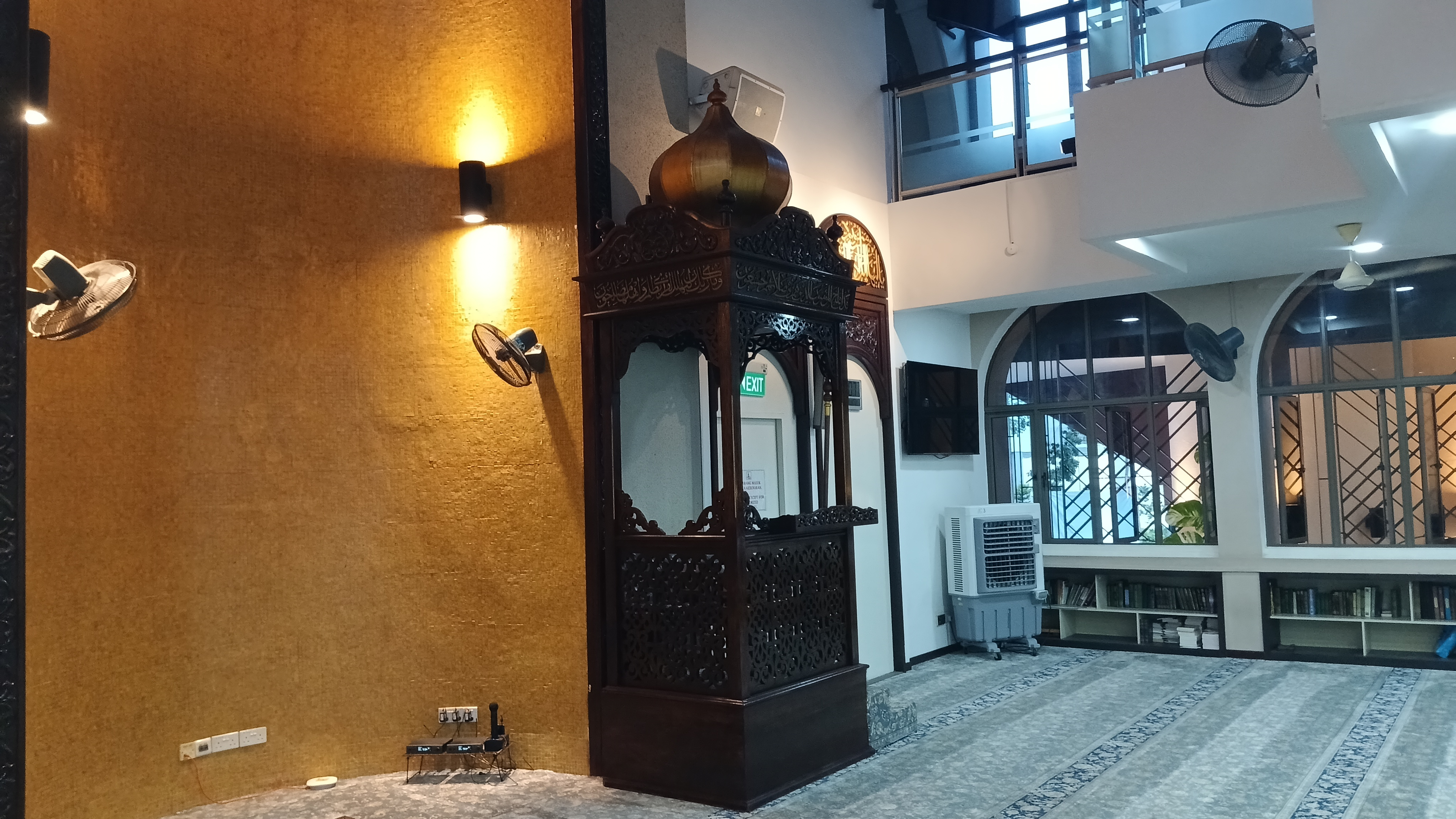
Minbar and mihrab

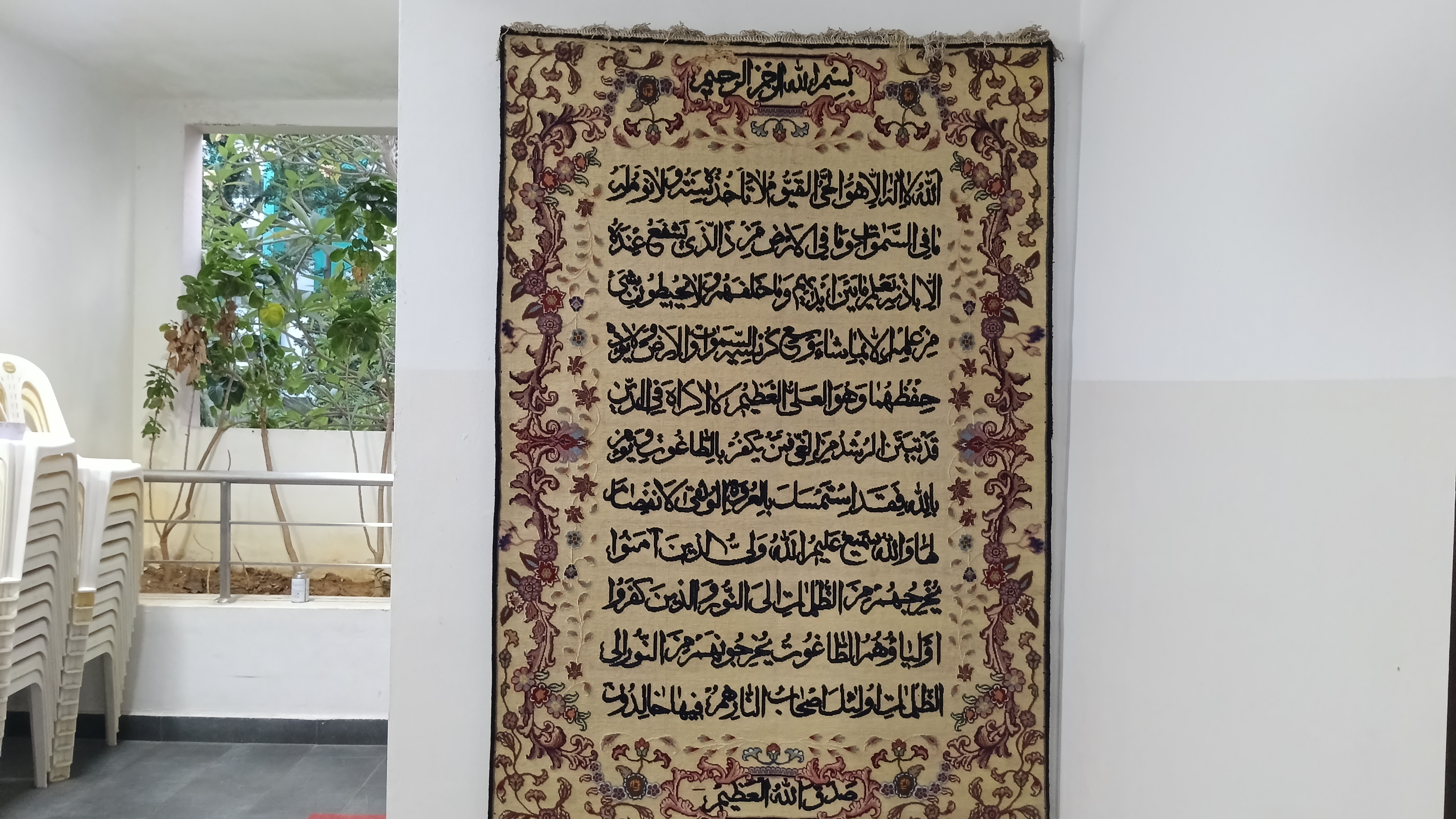
A woven engraving of the Āyat al-Kursī ("Throne Verse") displayed outside the main prayer hall.

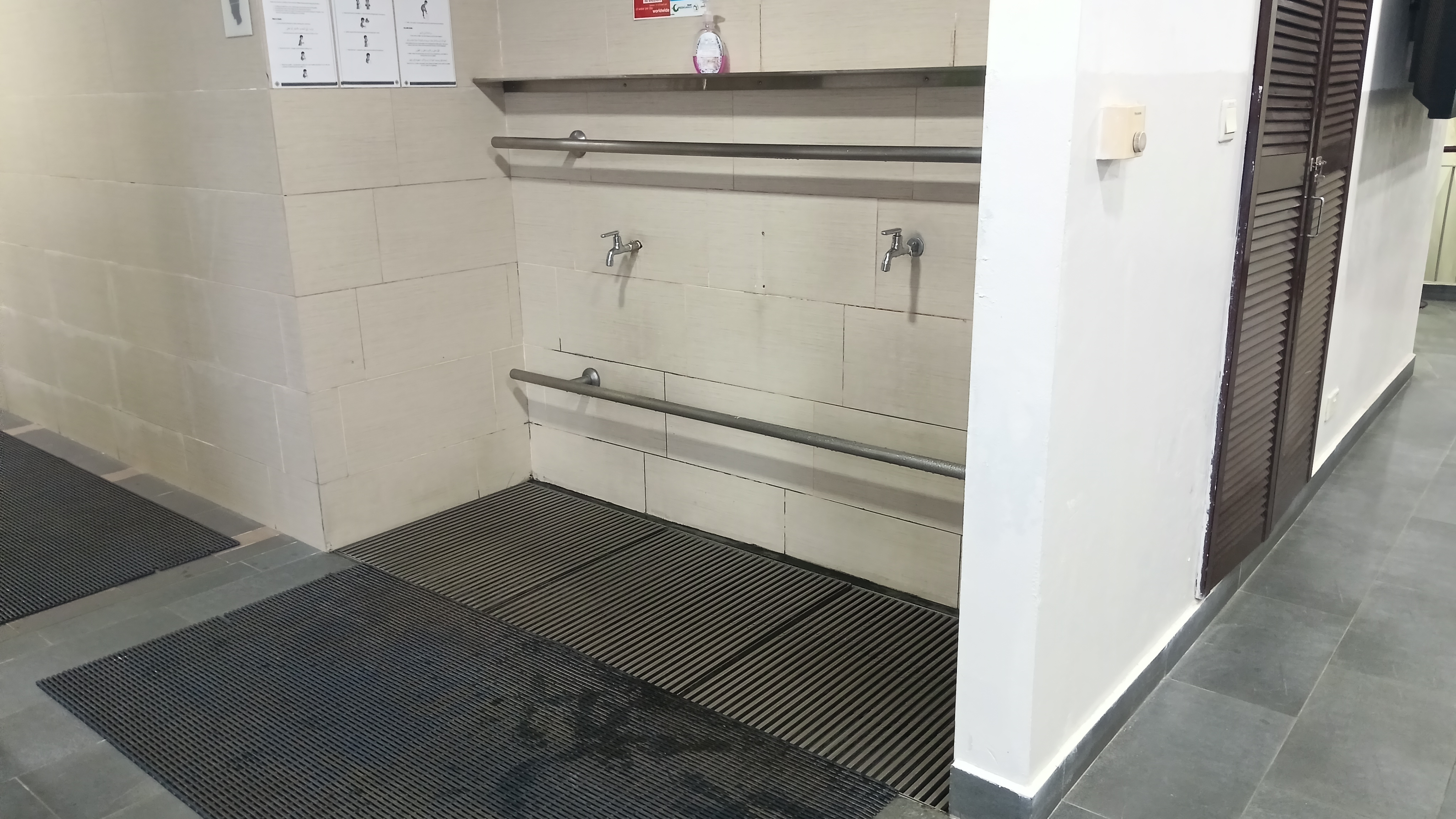
The place for the male worshippers to take their wudhu.

== See also ==
- List of mosques in Singapore
