= Auditor General of Singapore =

Singapore national audit agency

Auditor-General's Office
Agency overview
- Formed: 1867
- Jurisdiction: Government of Singapore
- Motto: To audit and report to the President and Parliament on the proper accounting and use of public resources so as to enhance public accountability and help strengthen the financial governance of the public service.
- Agency executives: Goh Soon Poh, Auditor-General; Rina Chua, Deputy Auditor-General; Ng Wee Leng, Assistant Auditor-General; Mabel Watt, Assistant Auditor-General
- Website: https://www.ago.gov.sg/
- Agency ID: T08GA0002D

The Auditor-General's Office (AGO) is an organ of state and Singapore's national auditor. The President is empowered under the Constitution to appoint the Auditor-General in accordance with the advice of the Prime Minister. But the President may, consistent with his reserve powers, refuse to grant such a request.

The Audit Act 1966 imposes a duty on the Auditor-General to audit the accounts of all departments and offices of the Singapore Government (including the office of the Public Service Commission), the accounts of the Supreme Court, all subordinate courts, and Parliament. The Act confers on the Auditor-General various investigatory powers to facilitate the carrying out of audits.

The AGO reports their findings directly to the President, Parliament, and the public, through the Annual Report of the Auditor-General. Audit findings are also shared with the management of the audited organisation.

== History ==
On 2 October 2017, Parliament passed amendments to the Audit Act 1966 to grant the AGO additional powers to conduct "follow-the-dollar" audits to trace public monies beyond government agencies to non-government organisations to which the monies are disbursed, such as voluntary welfare organisations and autonomous universities. These "follow-the-dollar" audits can only be carried out by the AGO if it is directed to do so by the Minister for Finance, who may only give such a direction if they are satisfied that it is in the public interest to do so.

== Management ==
The current Auditor-General is Goh Soon Poh. Goh was previously deputy secretary at the Ministry of Home Affairs and the Prime Minister's Office before her appointment as Auditor-General in 2019.

Goh is the wife of Senior Minister of State for Defence Heng Chee How. Responding to a question from MP Sylvia Lim in Parliament, the Minister-in-charge of the Public Service, Chan Chun Seng, clarified that there is generally no conflict of interest between the AGO and the ministries which they audit and further, political office-holders are not involved in the audits conducted by the AGO.
