= Moulmein (disambiguation) =

Moulmein (or "Mawlamyine") is the fourth largest city in Myanmar (Burma).

Moulmein may also refer to:

- Moulmein–Kallang Group Representation Constituency, a former electoral ward in Singapore
- Moulmein Single Member Constituency, a former constituency in Singapore
