= Shawn Loh =

Singaporean politician

The Honourable Shawn Loh
- 罗守恩

Member of Parliament for Jalan Besar GRC
- Incumbent
- Assumed office 4 May 2025
- Preceded by: PAP held
- Majority: 47,335 (50.42%)

Personal details
- Born: Shawn Loh Shou-En; 5 September 1987 (age 39)
- Party: People's Action Party

Shawn Loh Shou-En (Note: Chinese: 罗守恩; pinyin: Luó Shǒu'ēn) (Chinese: 罗守恩) is a Singaporean politician, civil servant, and business executive. He was elected to the Parliament of Singapore in the 2025 general election, and represents the Jalan Besar Group Representation Constituency as a member of the People's Action Party. He is also Commonwealth Capital Group's group managing director.

== Education ==
Loh has a Bachelors in Economics from the University of Chicago, and went on to obtain a Masters in Financial Economics from the University of Oxford.

== Career ==
Loh joined the Ministry of Finance (MOF) in June 2023 and was the director of security and resilience programmes at MOF. He was the Budget director for 2024 and 2025. Loh resigned from the MOF in March 2025, sparking speculation that he would contest in the 2025 Singaporean general election.

In April, Loh was spotted in a Jalan Besar event led by Josephine Teo and was eventually confirmed to replace retiring Senior Minister of State of Defence Heng Chee How. His team would proceed to win with 70,602 votes, 75.21% of the total votes. He is currently serving as the Member of Parliament (MP) for Jalan Besar GRC (Whampoa).

In January 2026, Loh took over as Commonwealth Capital Group's group managing director. He was previously the company's group director for business strategy and innovation for 18 months in 2020.

== Personal life ==
Loh married in 2011 and has four children.

== Notes ==
Parliament of Singapore
Preceded by Denise Phua; Josephine Teo; Heng Chee How; Wan Rizal	Member of Parliament for Jalan Besar GRC; 2025– present Served alongside: Denise Phua, Josephine Teo, Wan Rizal	Incumbent
