= Moulmein–Kallang Group Representation Constituency =

Singaporean electoral district (2011–2015)

Coordinates: 1.33°N 103.83°E

Moulmein–Kallang
- Former Group Representation constituency

Former constituency
- Created: 2011
- Abolished: 2015
- Member: 4
- Local council: Moulmein-Kallang
- Created from: Moulmein Single Member Constituency and Jalan Besar GRC
- Replaced by: Jalan Besar GRC, Bishan–Toa Payoh GRC, Holland–Bukit Timah GRC and Tanjong Pagar GRC

Moulmein–Kallang Group Representation Constituency was a defunct four-member Group Representation Constituency (GRC), comprising several city suburbs surrounding the Central Area of Singapore as well as a sizeable portion of the Central Business District. It existed from 2011 to 2015.

== History ==
The GRC was formed in the 2011 general election, and absorbed most parts of the Jalan Besar GRC and the Moulmein ward of Tanjong Pagar GRC. The GRC was dissolved in 2015 General Election, as it was reverted back to pre-2011 constituencies. Only the Jalan Besar constituency was dissolved and merged into Kampong Glam and Kreta Ayer-Kim Seng (Upper Boon Keng Road/Lorong 1 Geylang/Lorong 3 Geylang).

Moulmein–Kallang GRC were co-led by Minister of Communications and Information and Minister-in-charge of Muslim Affairs Yaacob Ibrahim, and Minister for Transport Lui Tuck Yew. The two abovementioned cabinet ministers retired from politics before the 2020.

The ward saw a contest in the 2011 general election between the incumbent People's Action Party and from Workers' Party of Singapore. The National Solidarity Party had expressed interest in contesting the constituency, but dropped out to avoid a three-cornered fight. The PAP emerged victor with 44,828 votes or 58.56% of the total ballots for the electoral division. Incidentally, this was one of the two highest vote percentages for the PAP in a Workers' Party-contested constituency alongside Nee Soon GRC.

In GE 2015, the Moulmein division was split into four parts and was absorbed into Jalan Besar GRC, Bishan–Toa Payoh GRC, Holland–Bukit Timah GRC and Tanjong Pagar GRC.

== Members of Parliament ==
Year	Division	Members of Parliament	Party
Formation
2011	Jalan Besar; Kampong Glam; Kolam Ayer; Moulmein	Edwin Tong; Denise Phua; Yaacob Ibrahim; Lui Tuck Yew	PAP
Constituency abolished (2015)

== Electoral results ==
Note: The Elections Department does not include rejected votes when calculating the vote shares of candidates. Hence, all candidates' vote shares will total to 100% at any given election (may not appear so in multi-way contests due to rounding).

=== Elections in 2010s ===
General Election 2011
Party	Candidate	Votes	%
PAP	Lui Tuck Yew Yaacob Ibrahim Denise Phua Edwin Tong	44,886	58.55
WP	Mohd Rahizan Ya'acob Toh Hong Boon L Somasundaram Frieda Chan	31,773	41.45
Majority		13,107	17.12
Total valid votes		76,659	97.88
Rejected ballots		1,659	2.12
Turnout		78,318	89.41
Registered electors		87,595	
PAP win (new seat)			
