= Heng Chee How =

Singaporean politician (born 1961)

- 王志豪

Deputy Secretary-General of the National Trades Union Congress
- Incumbent
- Assumed office 1 January 1999
- Secretary-General: Lim Boon Heng; Lim Swee Say; Chan Chun Sing; Ng Chee Meng

Mayor of Central Singapore District
- In office 24 November 2001 – 29 May 2006
- Prime Minister: Goh Chok Tong; Lee Hsien Loong
- Preceded by: Yaacob Ibrahim
- Succeeded by: Zainudin Nordin

Deputy Leader of the House
- In office 31 May 2011 – 30 September 2015
- Preceded by: PAP held
- Succeeded by: PAP held

Member of Parliament for Jalan Besar GRC
- In office 11 September 2015 – 15 April 2025
- Preceded by: Constituency established
- Succeeded by: PAP held
- In office 3 November 2001 – 19 April 2011
- Preceded by: PAP held
- Succeeded by: Constituency abolished

Member of Parliament for Whampoa SMC
- In office 7 May 2011 – 18 April 2015
- Preceded by: Constituency established
- Succeeded by: Constituency abolished

Personal details
- Born: Heng Chee How; 14 July 1961 (age 65) State of Singapore
- Party: People's Action Party
- Spouse: Goh Soon Poh
- Children: 1
- Education: Fitzwilliam College, Cambridge (MA); Harvard University (MPA)
- Occupation: Politician; trade unionist; police officer
- Police career
- Department: Singapore Police Force
- Service years: 1983–1995
- Rank: Superintendent

Heng Chee How (Note: Chinese: 王志豪; Pe̍h-ūe-jī: Hêng Chì-hâu; pinyin: Wáng Zhìháo) (born 14 July 1961) is a Singaporean union leader and former politician who was Senior Minister of State for Defence from 2018 to 2025 and has been deputy secretary-general of the National Trades Union Congress (NTUC) since 1999. A member of the governing People's Action Party (PAP), he was the Member of Parliament (MP) for the Whampoa division of Jalan Besar Group Representation Constituency (GRC) between 2001 and 2011, Whampoa Single Member Constituency (SMC) between 2011 and 2015, and again the Whampoa division of Jalan Besar GRC between 2015 and 2025.

Prior to entering politics, Heng had worked at the Singapore Police Force (SPF) and National Trades Union Congress (NTUC). He made his debut in electoral politics in the 1997 general election as a solo PAP candidate contesting in Hougang SMC against the Workers' Party's Low Thia Khiang. He lost to Low, who won 58.02% of the vote against his 41.98%.

During the 2001 general election, Heng joined the five-member PAP team contesting in Jalan Besar GRC and won with 74.48% of the vote. Heng was elected as the Member of Parliament representing the Whampoa ward of Jalan Besar GRC. Since then, he had retained his parliamentary seat in subsequent elections and had served as Minister of State and later Senior Minister of State in various ministries. He also served as Deputy Leader of the House in Parliament between 2011 and 2015. He retired in 2025.

== Early life and education ==
Born in a Chinese Singaporean of Teochew descent family, Heng was educated at Raffles Institution before graduating from Fitzwilliam College, Cambridge at the University of Cambridge in 1983 with a Bachelor of Arts with second upper class honours (later replaced by an Oxbridge Master of Arts) degree in economics under an undergraduate scholarship conferred by the Singapore Police Force (SPF) in 1980.

He subsequently went on to complete a Master of Public Administration degree at Harvard University's John F. Kennedy School of Government in 1992 under a postgraduate scholarship conferred by the Singapore Police Force (SPF).

Heng was also awarded the Edward S. Mason Fellowship in 1990, Lucius Littauer Fellowship Award from the John F. Kennedy School of Government in 1992 and Eisenhower Fellowship in 2001.

== Career ==
Heng started his career in 1983 in the Singapore Police Force (SPF) and held command and staff appointments, including Director of Manpower and Commander of the Geylang Police Division.

He attained the rank Superintendent and left the SPF in 1995 to join the National Trades Union Congress (NTUC) and took up various positions in the labour movement, including Chief Executive Officer of the NTUC Club (1995–1998), Executive Secretary of the Singapore Industrial and Services Employees Union, Executive Secretary of the United Workers of Electronic and Electrical Industries, and Divisional Director overseeing industrial relations, skills development, productivity improvement and employment assistance.

He became Assistant Secretary-General of the NTUC in 1997. In 1999, he was promoted to Deputy Secretary-General of the NTUC has held that position since then.

=== Political career ===
Heng made his political debut in the 1997 general election when he contested as a solo candidate from the People's Action Party (PAP) in Hougang SMC against the incumbent opposition Member of Parliament, Low Thia Khiang of the Workers' Party. He lost to Low, who won 58.02% of the vote against his 41.98%.

In the 2001 general election, Heng contested again as a PAP candidate, this time in Jalan Besar GRC, as part of a five-member PAP team. The PAP team won with 74.48% of the vote against the Singapore Democratic Alliance and Heng was elected as the Member of Parliament representing the Whampoa ward of Jalan Besar GRC. He served as Mayor of the Central District between 2001 and 2006.

On 12 August 2004, Heng was appointed Minister of State for Trade and Industry. On 1 May 2005, he was reappointed as Minister of State for National Development.

In the 2006 general election, Heng contested in Jalan Besar GRC again as part of a five-member PAP team and they won with 69.26% of the vote against the Singapore Democratic Alliance. After the election, Heng was appointed Minister of State for Health on 30 May 2006. On 1 April 2008, he became a Minister of State in the Prime Minister's Office.

During the 2011 general election, Heng contested as a solo PAP candidate in the newly formed Whampoa SMC and won with 66.1% of the vote against the National Solidarity Party's Ken Sun. On 21 May 2011, he was promoted to Senior Minister of State and continued serving in the Prime Minister's Office. On 31 May 2011, he also became Deputy Leader of the House in Parliament.

In the 2015 general election, Whampoa SMC was dissolved and became part of Jalan Besar GRC again. Heng contested in the election as part of a four-member PAP team in Jalan Besar GRC and won with 67.75% of the vote against the Workers' Party. Heng continued to be the Member of Parliament representing the Whampoa ward of Jalan Besar GRC after the election. On 1 May 2018, Heng was appointed as Senior Minister of State for Defence and has been holding that appointment since then after being elected again in the 2020 general election with 65.36% of the vote in Jalan Besar GRC.

Heng, as Deputy Secretary-General of the NTUC, is often called a labour MP by the Singapore media. In October 2024, ChannelNewsAsia noted that none of the labour MPs filed any questions or spoke during the parliamentary debate concerning the controversial deal to sell a controlling 51% stake in NTUC Enterprise subsidiary Income Insurance to Allianz.

On 17 April 2025, PAP announced that Heng was replaced by Shawn Loh in his Whampoa ward in the PAP team to contest Jalan Besar GRC for the 2025 general election.

== Personal life ==
Heng is married to Goh Soon Poh, who has been the Auditor-General of Singapore since 2019. She previously served as Deputy Secretary (Corporate) in the Ministry of Home Affairs (MHA) and the Prime Minister's Office (PMO). They have one daughter.

== Notes ==
Parliament of Singapore
Preceded by Choo Wee Khiang	Member of Parliament for Jalan Besar GRC (Whampoa)	Constituency abolished
New constituency	Member of Parliament for Whampoa SMC	Constituency abolished
New constituency	Member of Parliament for Jalan Besar GRC (Whampoa)	Succeeded by Shawn Loh
Government offices
Preceded by Yaacob Ibrahim	Mayor of Central Singapore district	Succeeded by Zainudin Nordin
