= Jalan Besar Group Representation Constituency =

Electoral division in Singapore

Jalan Besar
- Group representation constituency for the Parliament of Singapore
- Region: Central Region, Singapore
- Electorate: 106,342

Current constituency
- Created: 1988; 38 years ago
- Seats: 4
- Party: People's Action Party
- Members: Denise Phua; Josephine Teo; Shawn Loh; Wan Rizal
- Town Council: Jalan Besar
- Created from: Geylang West Constituency; Jalan Besar Constituency; Kolam Ayer Constituency
- Dissolved: 2011
- Replaced by: Moulmein–Kallang GRC; Whampoa SMC; Tanjong Pagar GRC
- Reformed: 2015
- Reformed from: Moulmein–Kallang GRC; Whampoa SMC; Tanjong Pagar GRC

Jalan Besar Group Representation Constituency is a four-member group representation constituency (GRC) in central Singapore. It has four divisions: Kreta Ayer–Kim Seng, Kolam Ayer, Whampoa, and Kampong Glam, managed by Jalan Besar Town Council. The current Members of Parliament (MPs) for the constituency are Denise Phua, Minister for Digital Development and Information Josephine Teo, Shawn Loh and Wan Rizal from the governing People's Action Party (PAP).

== History ==
=== Creation and first existence (1988–2011) ===
Jalan Besar GRC was created prior to the 1988 general election with three MPs. Led by Lee Boon Yang, the PAP team defeated the Workers' Party (WP) with 62.68% of the vote.

Prior to the 1991 general election, the GRC was expanded to have four MPs; the PAP won unopposed.

During the 1997 general election, the four-member PAP team, again led by Lee, defeated the Singapore Democratic Party (SDP) with 67.55% of the vote.

During the 2001 general election, the five-member PAP team defeated the Singapore Democratic Alliance (SDA) with 74.49% of the vote.

During the 2006 general election, the five-member PAP team defeated the SDA with 69.26% of the vote.

Jalan Besar GRC was dissolved ahead of the 2011 general election in favour of Moulmein–Kallang GRC and Whampoa Single Member Constituency (SMC). The Kreta Ayer–Kim Seng division was redrawn into Tanjong Pagar GRC.

==== Corruption by and resignation of Choo Wee Khiang ====
In 1999, Choo Wee Khiang was charged with cheating for issuing a false invoice from his company in November 1990 to Wong See Kee, his brother-in-law. Choo resigned from the PAP and Parliament before pleading guilty in court to a charge which was reduced from aggravated to simple cheating. Under Singaporean law at the time, an MP would lose their seat if they were sentenced to at least one year's imprisonment or a fine of more than S$2,000. Prime Minister Lee Hsien Loong said that Choo had done "the right thing" in resigning before pleading guilty in court. Choo was sentenced to two weeks' jail and fined $10,000.

=== Second existence (2015–present) ===
Prior to the 2015 general election, Jalan Besar GRC was reformed with four MPs after one parliamentary term, covering areas it had encompassed before its abolition in 2011. Led by Yaacob Ibrahim, the PAP team defeated the WP with 67.75% of the vote.

Prior to the 2020 general election, Yaacob and Lily Neo retired from politics; Josephine Teo was redeployed from Bishan–Toa Payoh GRC to lead the PAP team for Jalan Besar GRC. The PAP team defeated Lim Tean and his Peoples Voice (PV) party with 65.36% of the vote.

In the 2025 general election, the PAP announced that Heng Chee How, incumbent MP for Jalan Besar GRC, would be replaced by Shawn Loh as a candidate for the GRC. The PAP team defeated the People's Alliance for Reform (PAR), a political coalition, with 75.21% of the vote.

== Members of Parliament ==
Divisions or wards of Jalan Besar GRC as of the 2025 general election:
1 Kampong Glam
2 Kolam Ayer (part)
3 Kolam Ayer (part)
4 Kreta Ayer-Kim Seng
5 Whampoa

Election	Division	Members of Parliament	Party
Formation
1988	Geylang West; Jalan Besar; Kolam Ayer	Peh Chin Hua; Lee Boon Yang; Sidek Saniff	PAP
1991	Geylang West; Jalan Besar; Kallang; Kolam Ayer	Peh Chin Hua; Lee Boon Yang; Choo Wee Khiang; Zulkifli bin Mohamed	PAP
1997	Geylang West; Jalan Besar; Kolam Ayer; Whampoa	Peh Chin Hua; Lee Boon Yang; Yaacob Ibrahim; Choo Wee Khiang (1997–1999 (Note: Choo resigned before being charged and convicted in 1999 for cheating offences.))	PAP
2001	Jalan Besar; Kampong Glam; Kolam Ayer; Kreta Ayer - Kim Seng; Whampoa	Lee Boon Yang; Loh Meng See; Yaacob Ibrahim; Lily Neo; Heng Chee How	PAP
2006	Jalan Besar; Kampong Glam; Kolam Ayer; Kreta Ayer - Kim Seng; Whampoa	Lee Boon Yang; Denise Phua; Yaacob Ibrahim; Lily Neo; Heng Chee How	PAP
Constituency abolished (2011–2015)
2015	Kampong Glam; Kolam Ayer; Kreta Ayer - Kim Seng; Whampoa	Denise Phua; Yaacob Ibrahim; Lily Neo; Heng Chee How	PAP
2020	Kampong Glam; Kolam Ayer; Kreta Ayer - Kim Seng; Whampoa	Denise Phua; Wan Rizal; Josephine Teo; Heng Chee How	PAP
2025	Kampong Glam; Kolam Ayer; Kreta Ayer - Kim Seng; Whampoa	Denise Phua; Wan Rizal; Josephine Teo; Shawn Loh	PAP

== Electoral results ==
Note: The Elections Department does not include rejected votes when calculating the vote shares of candidates. Hence, all candidates' vote shares will total to 100% at any given election (may not appear so in multi-way contests due to rounding).

=== Elections in 1980s ===
General Election 1988: Jalan Besar GRC
Party	Candidate	Votes	%
PAP	Peh Chin Hua Lee Boon Yang Sidek Saniff	31,604	62.68
WP	Marsh Edund Richard Mohamed Bin Idris Toh Keng Thong	18,814	37.32
Majority		12,790	25.37
Registered electors		54,941	
Turnout		50,418	91.77
PAP win (new seat)			

=== Elections in 1990s ===
General Election 1991: Jalan Besar GRC
Party	Candidate	Votes	%	±%
PAP	Choo Wee Khiang; Lee Boon Yang; Peh Chin Hua; Zulkifli Mohammed	Unopposed		
Registered electors		82,615		
PAP hold				

General Election 1997: Jalan Besar GRC
Party	Candidate	Votes	%	±%
PAP	Choo Wee Khiang Lee Boon Yang Peh Chin Hua Yaacob Ibrahim	44,840	67.55	N/A
SDP	David Chew Gandhi Ambalam Jufrie Mahmood Low Yong Nguan	21,537	32.45	
Majority		23,303	35.10	N/A
Registered electors		71,922		N/A
Turnout		66,377	92.29	N/A
PAP hold				

=== Elections in 2000s ===
General Election 2001: Jalan Besar GRC
Party	Candidate	Votes	%	±%
PAP	Heng Chee How Lee Boon Yang Loh Meng See Lily Neo Yaacob Ibrahim	68,309	74.49	▲6.94
SDA	Desmond Lim M Rahizan Ng Kee How Reno Fong Sin Kek Tong	23,391	25.51	N/A
Majority		44,918	48.98	▲13.88
Registered electors		100,268		▲39.41
Turnout		91,700	91.45	▼0.84
PAP hold		Swing	▲6.94	

General Election 2006: Jalan Besar GRC
Party	Candidate	Votes	%	±%
PAP	Denise Phua Heng Chee How Lee Boon Yang Lily Neo Yaacob Ibrahim	58,913	69.26	▼5.23
SDA	Cheo Chai Chen Muhammad Ali Aman Reno Fong Sebastian Teo Vincent Yeo	26,151	30.74	▲5.23
Majority		32,762	38.51	▼10.47
Registered electors		93,025		▼7.22
Turnout		85,064	91.50	▲0.05
PAP hold		Swing	▼5.23	

=== Elections in 2010s ===
General Election 2015
Party	Candidate	Votes	%
PAP	Denise Phua Heng Chee How Lily Neo Yaacob Ibrahim	63,644	67.75
WP	Adrian Sim Frieda Chan L Somasundaram Redzwan Hafidz Abdul Razak	30,302	32.25
Majority		33,342	35.50
Registered electors		102,540	
Rejected ballots		1,550	1.6
Turnout		95,496	93.1
PAP win (new seat)			

=== Elections in 2020s ===
General Election 2020
Party	Candidate	Votes	%	±%
PAP	Denise Phua Heng Chee How Josephine Teo Wan Rizal	64,631	65.36	▼2.37
PV	Lim Tean Leong Sze Hian Michael Fang Amin Nor Azlan Sulaiman	34,261	34.64	N/A
Majority		30,370	30.72	▼4.78
Total valid votes		98,892	97.11	
Rejected ballots		2,948	2.89	▲1.29
Turnout		101,840	94.54	
Registered electors		107,720		▲5.05
PAP hold		Swing	▼2.37	

General Election 2025
Party	Candidate	Votes	%	±%
PAP	Denise Phua Josephine Teo Shawn Loh Wan Rizal	70,602	75.21	▲9.85
PAR	Chiu Shin Kong Mohamad Hamim Aliyas Sarina Abu Hassan Vigneswari V Ramachandran	23,267	24.79	N/A
Majority		47,335	50.42	▲19.70
Total valid votes		93,869	96.56	▼0.55
Rejected ballots		3,349	3.44	▲0.55
Turnout		97,218	91.42	▼3.12
Registered electors		106,342		▼1.28
PAP hold		Swing	▲9.85	

== See also ==
- Jalan Besar SMC
- Moulmein–Kallang GRC
