= Peh Chin Hua =

Singaporean politician

- 白振华

Member of the Singapore Parliament for Jalan Besar GRC
- In office 14 December 1986 – 18 October 2001
- Preceded by: Constituency established
- Succeeded by: PAP held

Personal details
- Born: Peh Chin Hua; 1947 (age 78–79) Colony of Singapore
- Party: People's Action Party (1986-2015)
- Children: 3
- Education: Ai Tong School; Nan Chiau High School; River Valley High School; The Chinese High School
- Alma mater: National University of Singapore (NUS)
- Profession: Entrepreneur; Politician

Peh Chin Hua (Note: Chinese: 白振华; Pe̍h-ōe-jī: Pe̍h Chín-hôa; pinyin: Bái Zhènhuá) (born 1947) is a former Singaporean politician. A member of the governing People's Action Party (PAP), he served as a Member of Parliament (MP) for Jalan Besar Group Representation Constituency (GRC) between 1988 and 2001. He retired from politics in 2001.

== Political career ==
Peh's career in public service spanned 25 years. He started out as the member of the Kim Seng Grassroots Organisation in 1973. He was appointed honorary secretary of the Kim Seng Community Centre Management Committee, and later served as the chairman of the Kim Seng Citizens' Consultative Committee.

Peh was first elected to the Singapore Parliament in 1988, when he won the constituency seat for Geylang West in the Jalan Besar GRC with 62.68% of total votes cast. He was re-elected in 1991 without contest and in 1997 with a landslide win against the Singapore Democratic Party. He retired from politics on 3 November 2001.

== Business career ==
Peh was the founder and executive chairman of Singapore's publicly listed Dragon Land Limited from 1992 to 2005, overseeing several real estate projects in various coastal cities in China. He is currently the executive chairman of White Group.

== Personal life ==
Peh is an alumnus of the National University of Singapore, holding an Executive master's degree in business administration. He is also an alumnus of Nan Chiau High School, River Valley High School, and The Chinese High School. He is married with three children and four grandchildren.
