= Yaacob Ibrahim =

Singaporean politician

- يعقوب إبراهيم
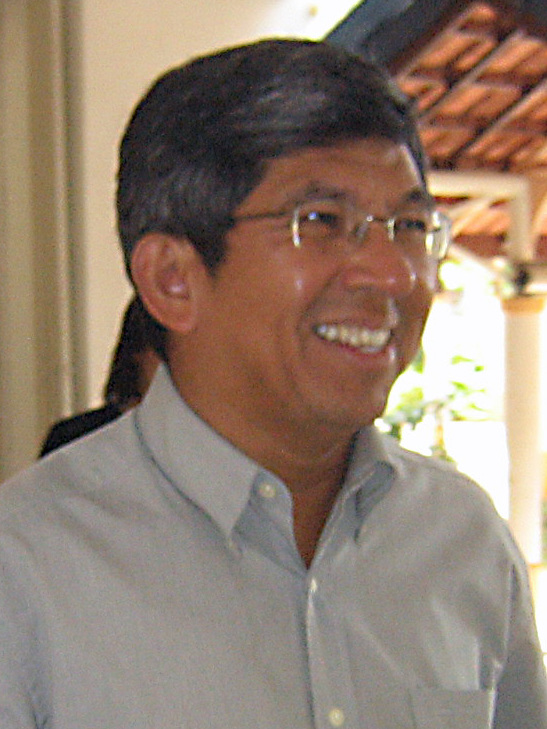
- Yaacob in 2006

Minister-in-charge of Cyber Security
- In office 1 November 2015 – 30 April 2018
- Prime Minister: Lee Hsien Loong
- Preceded by: Position established
- Succeeded by: S. Iswaran

Minister for Communications and Information
- In office 21 May 2011 – 30 April 2018
- Prime Minister: Lee Hsien Loong
- Second Minister: Lawrence Wong (2014–2015)
- Preceded by: Lui Tuck Yew (as Minister for Information, Communication and the Arts)
- Succeeded by: S. Iswaran

Minister for the Environment and Water Resources
- In office 12 August 2004 – 20 May 2011
- Prime Minister: Lee Hsien Loong
- Preceded by: Lim Swee Say (as Minister for the Environment)
- Succeeded by: Vivian Balakrishnan

Minister for Community Development and Sports
- In office 12 May 2003 – 11 August 2004; Acting: 25 March 2002 – 11 May 2003
- Prime Minister: Goh Chok Tong; Lee Hsien Loong
- Preceded by: Abdullah Tarmugi
- Succeeded by: Vivian Balakrishnan (as Minister for Community Development, Youth and Sports)

Minister-in-charge of Muslim Affairs
- In office 25 March 2002 – 30 April 2018
- Prime Minister: Goh Chok Tong; Lee Hsien Loong
- Preceded by: Abdullah Tarmugi
- Succeeded by: Masagos Zulkifli

Personal details
- Born: Yaacob bin Ibrahim; 3 October 1955 (age 71) Colony of Singapore
- Party: People's Action Party
- Children: 2
- Education: University of Singapore; Stanford University
- Occupation: Politician; engineer; professor

Yaacob bin Ibrahim (Note: Jawi: يعقوب بن إبراهيم) (born 3 October 1955) is a Singaporean former People's Action Party politician who served as minister-in-charge of Muslim affairs between 2002 and 2018, minister for community development, youth and sports between 2002 and 2004, minister for the environment and water resources between 2004 and 2011, minister for communications and information between 2011 and 2018, and minister-in-charge of cyber security between 2015 and 2018. He was the Member of Parliament (MP) representing the Kolam Ayer division of Jalan Besar GRC between 1997 and 2020.

== Education and early life ==
Yaacob attended Tanjong Katong Technical Secondary School (now Tanjong Katong Secondary School).

He served as a clerk in national service.

He graduated from the University of Singapore (now National University of Singapore) with a bachelor's degree with honours in civil engineering in 1980. He subsequently went on to obtained a PhD at Stanford University in 1989.

== Career ==
=== Academia career ===
Yaacob started his career as a postdoc at Cornell University. He returned to Singapore in 1990 and joined the National University of Singapore in 1991.

He received his department's teaching excellence award in 1994. He took leave of absence from the university as an associate professor to take up public office.

=== Political career ===
Yaacob made his political debut in the 1997 general election as part of the five-member PAP team contesting in Jalan Besar GRC and won. He was elected as the Member of Parliament representing the Kolam Ayer ward of Jalan Besar GRC between 1997 and 2011 and 2015 and 2020 and later Moulmein–Kallang GRC between 2011 and 2015.

In April 2001, he was appointed as the first mayor of Central Singapore District, a role he served until November 2001.

Yaacob was parliamentary secretary for communications and information technology and later senior parliamentary secretary. He became minister of state for community development and sports in November 2001. In March 2002, Yaacob became the acting minister for community development and sports and minister-in-charge of Muslim affairs and was made a full Cabinet minister in May 2003.

He became minister of environment and water resources in 2004. In 2009, after the Bukit Timah canal burst its banks after a downpour, resulting in parts of Bukit Timah being submerged, Yaacob remarked it was a freak event that "occurs once in 50 years".

During the 2006 general election, Yaacob was part of the five-member PAP team contesting in Jalan Besar GRC and won 69.26% of the vote against the Singapore Democratic Alliance.

During the 2011 general election, Yaacob was part of the four-member PAP team contesting Moulmein–Kallang GRC and won 58.55% of the vote against the Workers' Party.

In May 2011, as part of a Cabinet reshuffle, Yaacob became minister for information, communication and the arts. He continued to serve as the minister-in-charge of Muslim affairs. Yaacob is also the vice-chairman of the party's Central Executive Committee (CEC).

During the 2015 general election, Yaacob was part of the four-member PAP team contesting in Jalan Besar GRC and won 67.75% of the vote against the Workers' Party. In April 2015, Yaacob was appointed as minister-in-charge of cyber security and oversees the Cyber Security Agency (CSA), an agency formed under the Prime Minister's Office (PMO).

In 2017, Yaacob declined competing in the 2017 presidential election and preferred to do policy work.

Yaacob stepped down from the cabinet on 30 April 2018. After the 13th Parliament was dissolved on 23 June 2020, Yaacob retired from politics, ending his political career after 23 years of service.

=== Post-political career ===
Since retirement from politics, Yaacob has returned to academia. He is currently a professor in practice at the Lee Kuan Yew School of Public Policy at the National University of Singapore, and also an advisor to the Office of the president of the Singapore Institute of Technology (SIT) and the founding director of the Community Leadership and Social Innovation Centre (CLASIC) at SIT.

In October 2024, the Palestinian Scholarship Initiative was launched as a ground-up initiative to sponsor the undergraduate studies of Palestinians in Singapore universities, with Yaacob co-chairing the Scholarship Administration Committee.

== Personal life ==
Yaacob has been active in community service since his school days and has been involved with the Association of Muslim Professionals, Jamiyah, Majlis Ugama Islam Singapura and the Nature Society. Initially a volunteer tutor, he became Chairman of the Council for the Development of Singapore Malay/Muslim Community (Yayasan Mendaki) in March 2002.

He is married with an American woman and has a son and a daughter. Questions arose in regards to his son's citizenship and if he would serve National Service (NS) were raised when the United States diplomatic cables leak stated that Yaacob's two children are American citizens. In response, he clarified that his children had dual American and Singapore citizenship until the age of 18 because of the status of his wife as an American citizen. He confirmed that his son would serve NS.

Yaacob has eight siblings. His eldest brother Ismail Ibrahim was the first Malay recipient of the President's Scholarship. His sister Zuraidah Ibrahim was a former Straits Times journalist now with South China Morning Post. His younger brother Latiff Ibrahim is a lawyer. His sister Hamidah Ibrahim was a district judge with the state courts.

== Filmography ==
- Gunting The Movie (2017)

As himself

== Notes ==
Political offices
Preceded by Abdullah Tarmugi	Minister-in-charge of Muslim Affairs; 12 May 2003 – 1 May 2018; Acting: 25 March 2002 – 11 May 2003	Succeeded by Masagos Zulkifli
Preceded by Abdullah Tarmugi	Minister for Community Development and Sports; 12 May 2003 – 11 August 2004; Acting: 25 March 2002 – 11 May 2003	Succeeded by Vivian Balakrishnan as Minister for Community Development, Youth and Sports
Preceded by Lim Swee Say as Minister for the Environment	Minister for the Environment and Water Resources; 12 August 2004 – 20 May 2011	Succeeded by Vivian Balakrishnan
Preceded by Lui Tuck Yew as Minister for Information, Communications and the Arts	Minister for Information, Communications and the Arts; 21 May 2011 – 31 October 2012	Succeeded by S. Iswaran as Minister for Communications and Information
Preceded by Lui Tuck Yew as Minister for Information, Communications and the Arts	Minister for Communications and Information; 1 November 2012 – 1 May 2018	Succeeded by S. Iswaran as Minister for Communications and Information
Parliament of Singapore
Preceded by Zulkifli Mohamed	Member of Parliament for Jalan Besar GRC (Kolam Ayer); 1997–2011	Constituency abolished
New constituency	Member of Parliament for Moulmein–Kallang GRC (Kolam Ayer); 2011–2015	Constituency abolished
New constituency	Member of Parliament for Jalan Besar GRC (Kolam Ayer); 2015–2020	Succeeded by Wan Rizal
Government offices
New office	Mayor of Central Singapore district 1 April 2001 – 23 November 2001	Succeeded by Heng Chee How
