= Chiam See Tong =

Singaporean politician (born 1935)

- 詹时中
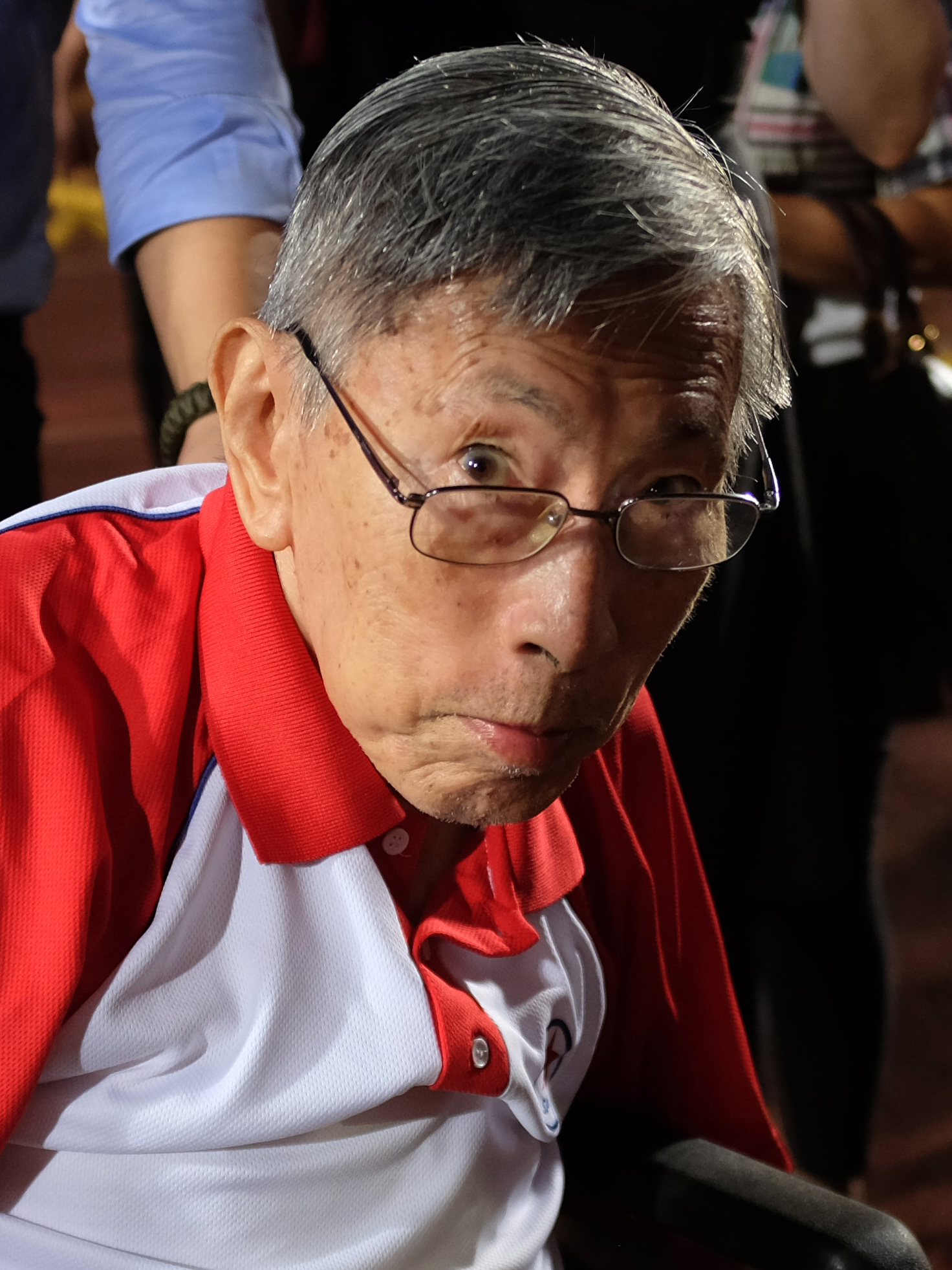
- Chiam in 2015

Leader of the Opposition (Note: De facto, not an official position in parliamentary proceedings.)
- In office 26 May 1997 – 20 April 2006
- Prime Minister: Goh Chok Tong; Lee Hsien Loong
- Preceded by: Ling How Doong
- Succeeded by: Low Thia Khiang
- In office 10 November 1986 – 6 August 1993
- Prime Minister: Lee Kuan Yew; Goh Chok Tong
- Preceded by: J. B. Jeyaretnam
- Succeeded by: Ling How Doong

2nd Secretary-General of the Singapore People's Party
- In office December 1996 – 16 October 2019
- Chairman: Sin Kek Tong (1996–2012); Lina Loh (2012–2019)
- Preceded by: Sin Kek Tong
- Succeeded by: Steve Chia

Member of Parliament for Potong Pasir SMC
- In office 22 December 1984 – 19 April 2011
- Preceded by: Howe Yoon Chong
- Succeeded by: Sitoh Yih Pin
- Majority: 1984: 3,454 (20.6%); 1988: 4,911 (26.2%); 1991: 7,096 (39.2%); 1997: 1,814 (10.30%); 2001: 751 (4.8%); 2006: 1,718 (11.6%)

1st Secretary-General of the Singapore Democratic Party
- In office 6 August 1980 – 18 June 1993
- Chairman: Fok Tai Loy; Soon Kia Seng; Ling How Doong
- Preceded by: Position established
- Succeeded by: Chee Soon Juan

1st Chairman of the Singapore Democratic Alliance
- In office 2001–2011
- Preceded by: Position established
- Succeeded by: Desmond Lim

Personal details
- Born: Chiam See Tong; 12 March 1935 (age 91) Singapore, Straits Settlements
- Other political affiliations: Independent (1976–1980); Singapore Democratic Party (1980–1996); Singapore Democratic Alliance (2001–2011); Singapore People's Party (1996–2019)
- Spouse: Lina Loh (m. 1975)
- Children: 1
- Education: Anglo-Chinese School
- Alma mater: Victoria University of Wellington (BSc)
- Occupation: Politician; Lawyer; Teacher

Chiam See Tong (Note: Chinese: 詹时中; Pe̍h-ūe-jī: Chiam Sî-tong; pinyin: Zhān Shízhōng) (born 12 March 1935) is a Singaporean former politician and lawyer who served as secretary-general of the Singapore Democratic Party (SDP) between 1980 and 1993, and later served as secretary-general of the Singapore People's Party (SPP) between 2011 and 2019 and as chairman of the Singapore Democratic Alliance (SDA) from 2001 to 2011. Chiam was the de facto Leader of the Opposition from 1986 to 1993 and again from 1997 to 2006. Throughout his parliamentary career, he had represented Potong Pasir from 1984 to 2011. (Note: As Potong Pasir Single Member Constituency (SMC) from 1988.)

Born when Singapore was part of the Straits Settlements, Chiam was educated at the Victoria University of Wellington and initially worked as a teacher. He later studied law at the Inner Temple in London, qualifying as a barrister in 1974. Around the same time, he began his political career as an independent candidate, unsuccessfully contesting at Cairnhill in the 1976 general election and at Potong Pasir in the 1979 by-elections. He established the SDP in 1980 and again unsuccessfully contested the general election at Potong Pasir that same year. He was elected to Parliament on his fourth attempt in the 1984 general election, defeating the People's Action Party (PAP) candidate Mah Bow Tan in Potong Pasir. At the time, he was one of only two opposition Members of Parliament (MPs), alongside J. B. Jeyaretnam of the Workers' Party (WP). Following Jeyaretnam's removal from Parliament in 1986, Chiam became the sole opposition MP and assumed the role of de facto Leader of the Opposition. He continued to lead the opposition through the 1991 general election, in which the SDP won three SMCs, marking the party's best electoral performance to date.

In 1993, Chiam resigned as secretary-general of the SDP following a dispute with assistant secretary-general Chee Soon Juan, during which the party's Central Executive Committee (CEC) sided with Chee, leading to Chiam's loss of leadership in the party he had founded. He later joined the SPP and retained his seat in Parliament at the 1997 general election. In 2001, he formed the SDA by bringing together the SPP, the National Solidarity Party (NSP), the Pertubuhan Kebangsaan Melayu Singapura (PKMS) and the Singapore Justice Party (SJP), serving as its chairman until 2011. Prior to the 2011 general election, Chiam withdrew the SPP from the SDA and led a team to contest in Bishan–Toa Payoh GRC, but was defeated by the PAP team. Chiam decided not to contest in the 2015 general election, citing health reasons stemming from a stroke that he suffered in 2008. His parliamentary tenure of 27 years made him the longest-serving opposition MP in Singapore until he was surpassed by WP's Low Thia Kiang in 2018. He remains Singapore's longest-serving de facto Leader of the Opposition, having held the position for a total of over 15 years.

== Early life and career ==
Born in Singapore during British colonial rule, Chiam was educated at Anglo-Chinese School (ACS), where he was an accomplished swimmer and a member of the school's relay team. He completed his GCE Advanced Level examinations in 1955 and subsequently graduated from the Victoria University of Wellington in 1961 with a Bachelor of Science (BSc).

Following his graduation, Chiam began his teaching career at Mahmud Secondary School in Raub, Pahang in British Malaya from 1962 to 1963, and later taught at Cedar Girls' Secondary School in Singapore between 1964 and 1972. During this period, he undertook training at the Teachers' Training College and received a Certificate in Education in 1967.

Chiam later pursued a career in law, reading law at the Inner Temple in London and qualifying as a barrister in 1974. Upon his return to Singapore, he was admitted to the bar as an advocate and solicitor. He practised at Philip Wong & Co from 1974 to 1976 before establishing his own firm, Chiam & Co. He operated the firm until 2002, when he closed it to focus fully on his parliamentary duties.

== Political career ==
Chiam made his political debut in the 1976 general election, standing as an independent candidate in Cairnhill against Lim Kim San, a veteran People's Action Party (PAP) candidate and long-serving Cabinet minister. He was defeated with 31.83 percent of the vote, while Lim secured 68.17 percent.

In the 1979 by-elections, Chiam contested in Potong Pasir as an independent candidate against PAP newcomer Howe Yoon Chong. He again lost, receiving 33.15 percent of the vote to Howe's 66.85 percent.

=== Singapore Democratic Party ===
Chiam founded the Singapore Democratic Party (SDP) on 6 August 1980, ahead of the 1980 general election held on 23 December 1980, and served as the party's secretary-general. He contested in the election for Potong Pasir again as a SDP candidate against Howe. In an election rally, Howe disparaged Chiam on his professional competence. Chiam eventually lost to Howe again with 40.95% of the vote against Howe's 59.05%.

==== Lawsuits against Howe and Dhanabalan ====
In 1981, Chiam filed a lawsuit against the Minister for Defence Howe Yoon Chong and the Minister for Foreign Affairs S. Dhanabalan for alleged slander arising from remarks made during speeches in 1980. Howe had described Chiam as a "twice unsuccessful lawyer" and "a lawyer who is not even very good at law", while Dhanabalan referred to him as "a two-bit lawyer orchestrating a three-piece band whose members only appear once every four or five years". J. B. Jeyaretnam, a lawyer and fellow opposition Member of Parliament from the Workers' Party (WP), represented Chiam in initiating legal proceedings in the High Court, seeking damages.

Dhanabalan later issued a public apology to Chiam, while Howe withdrew his remarks regarding Chiam's professional competence and offered compensation. Following their responses, Chiam accepted the apologies and withdrew the suits. The incident was notable as one of the few occasions in which senior PAP figures publicly accepted responsibility and offered reparations after being sued for defamation by an opposition politician.

=== Member of parliament ===
During the 1984 general election, Chiam contested as an SDP candidate in Potong Pasir again, this time against a new PAP candidate Mah Bow Tan. In the lead-up to the election, Prime Minister Lee Kuan Yew compared Chiam and Mah's GCE Ordinary Level results in a rally speech: "Mah Bow Tan, age 16, took his O Levels — six distinctions, two credits. Mr Chiam, age 18 — six credits, one pass." The Prime Minister's Office later conveyed an apology from Lee for making an error about Chiam's results; Chiam had actually gotten seven credits. Chiam eventually won the election with 60.28% of the vote against Mah's 39.72%, and was elected as the MP representing Potong Pasir SMC. He retained his parliamentary seat in Potong Pasir (now as an SMC) following the 1988 and 1991 general elections after garnering 63.13% and 69.64% of the vote in those two elections against PAP candidates Kenneth Chen Koon Lap and Andy Gan respectively.

Chiam in 1985 (far right), observing the burning of ballot papers conducted months after the 1984 general election. Standing on the far left is Workers' Party (WP) member Low Thia Khiang.

When Chiam was first elected into Parliament in 1984, he was one of only two opposition MPs, the other being J. B. Jeyaretnam, the Workers' Party secretary-general. After Jeyaretnam lost his parliamentary seat in 1986, Chiam remained the sole elected opposition Member of Parliament until after the 1991 general election, which saw three other opposition politicians becoming elected Members of Parliament: Ling How Doong and Cheo Chai Chen of the SDP, and Low Thia Khiang of the Workers' Party. Chiam was the de facto Leader of the Opposition. At the time of the 1991 general election, the SDP had its best electoral results — having all nine candidates polled in the top 10, scoring 48.6% of the party's popular vote, including Chiam's personal best electoral result and the highest share or votes any Opposition has ever garnered at 69.64%.

=== Leaving the SDP ===
In 1992, Chiam recruited Chee Soon Juan, a psychology lecturer at the National University of Singapore, to join a four-member SDP team to contest in Marine Parade GRC in the 1992 by-elections. Although the SDP team lost after garnering just 24.5% against a four-member PAP team led by Prime Minister Goh Chok Tong, Chee's candidacy had generated considerable public interest as it was the first time that an academic from a state-run university had stood for election against the PAP. Chee subsequently became the assistant secretary-general of the SDP and Chiam's protégé.

In the same year, PAP MP Choo Wee Khiang said in a speech that when he drove to Little India one evening, he found it "pitch dark, not because there was no light, but because there were too many Indians around." Chiam was the only MP who called out Choo for his remarks.

In 1993, the SDP experienced significant leadership changes and internal challenges. Tensions had been present between Chiam, the party's secretary-general, and other members of the Central Executive Committee (CEC) prior to Chee Soon Juan's joining the party. These tensions escalated when Chiam attempted to censure Chee for a hunger strike, a motion that the CEC did not support. In response, Chiam resigned from his position as secretary-general on May 17, 1993. Filing a lawsuit against the SDP, Chiam obtained a court reversal of his expulsion, allowing him to retain his parliamentary seat until the next general election.

In 1995, Chiam supported the PAP government's refusal to delay the execution of Filipino domestic worker Flor Contemplacion for murder despite appeals from Fidel V. Ramos, the President of the Philippines. After the incident caused Philippines–Singapore relations to be strained, Chiam made a speech in Parliament, stating that he would not allow the foreign press to use the opposition to attack Singapore's domestic policies.

=== Singapore People's Party ===
Chiam left the SDP in December 1996 and joined the Singapore People's Party, founded in 1994 by a SDP faction of pro-Chiam supporters, as secretary-general. Under the SPP banner, he contested in Potong Pasir SMC again during the 1997 general election and won with 55.15% of the vote against the PAP candidate Andy Gan.

==== Singapore Democratic Alliance ====
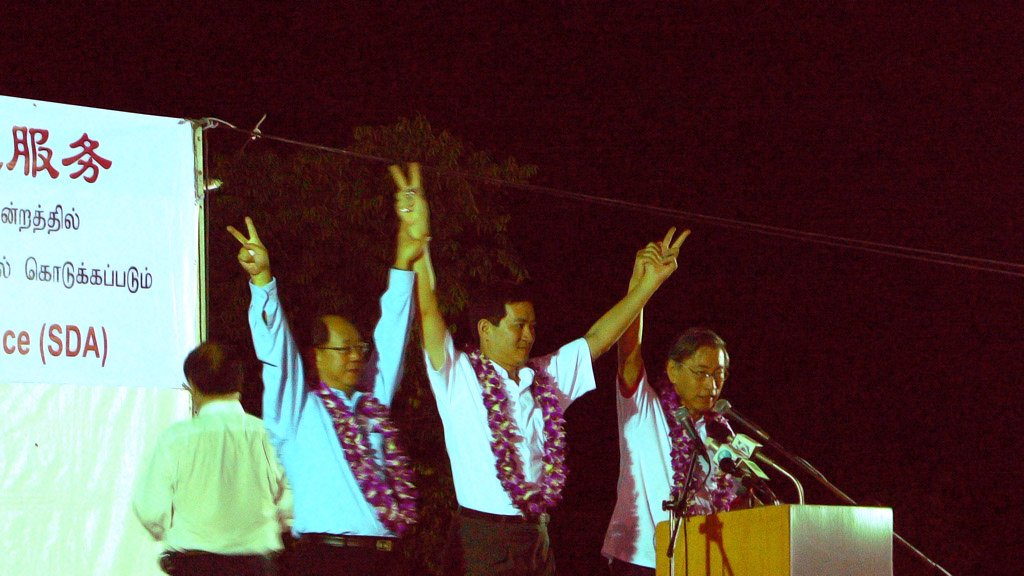
Steve Chia (centre) and Chiam (right) at a Singapore Democratic Alliance (SDA) rally during the campaign period for the 2006 general election.

Ahead of the 2001 general election, the SPP joined forces with three other opposition parties — National Solidarity Party (NSP), Pertubuhan Kebangsaan Melayu Singapura (PKMS) and Singapore Justice Party (SJP) — to form the Singapore Democratic Alliance, with Chiam as the SDA's chairman. Chiam then contested in the general election under the SDA banner in Potong Pasir SMC and won with 52.43% of the vote against the PAP candidate Sitoh Yih Pin, thus continuing for a fifth term in Parliament as the MP for Potong Pasir SMC. He closed his law firm, Chiam & Co, in the following year to become a full-time Member of Parliament.

Chiam was elected to Parliament for a sixth term after winning the 2006 general election with 55.82% of the vote against Sitoh again. Chiam's victory was a surprise, especially since the PAP had offered a S$80 million upgrading package for Potong Pasir residents and had brought in former Prime Minister Goh Chok Tong to assist in the PAP campaign in the constituency.

In early 2008, Chiam suffered a mild stroke which led to the suspension of his regular Meet-the-People Sessions. Although he recovered, Chiam said in 2011 that there were still remnants of the stroke he had suffered.

In 2009, Chiam celebrated his 25th year as the Member of Parliament for Potong Pasir SMC. That year, he also announced that he did not plan to contest in Potong Pasir SMC in the next general election, and would instead contest in a group representation constituency (GRC).

In 2010, Chiam tried to bring the Reform Party into the SDA. He reportedly accepted the conditions the Reform Party set out for joining the SDA, but the other members of the SDA council opposed the terms of entry and blocked the move. In 2010 and early 2011, it was reported the some SDA council members felt that Chiam was unable to fulfil his role as the chairman of the party after his stroke in 2008. On 28 February 2011, the SDA council voted to relieve Chiam of his role as chairman, but stressed that they still hoped to field him as a candidate in the next general election. On 2 March 2011, Chiam announced that the SPP was withdrawing from the SDA, and that he would contest under the SPP banner in the next general election.

==== 2011 general election ====
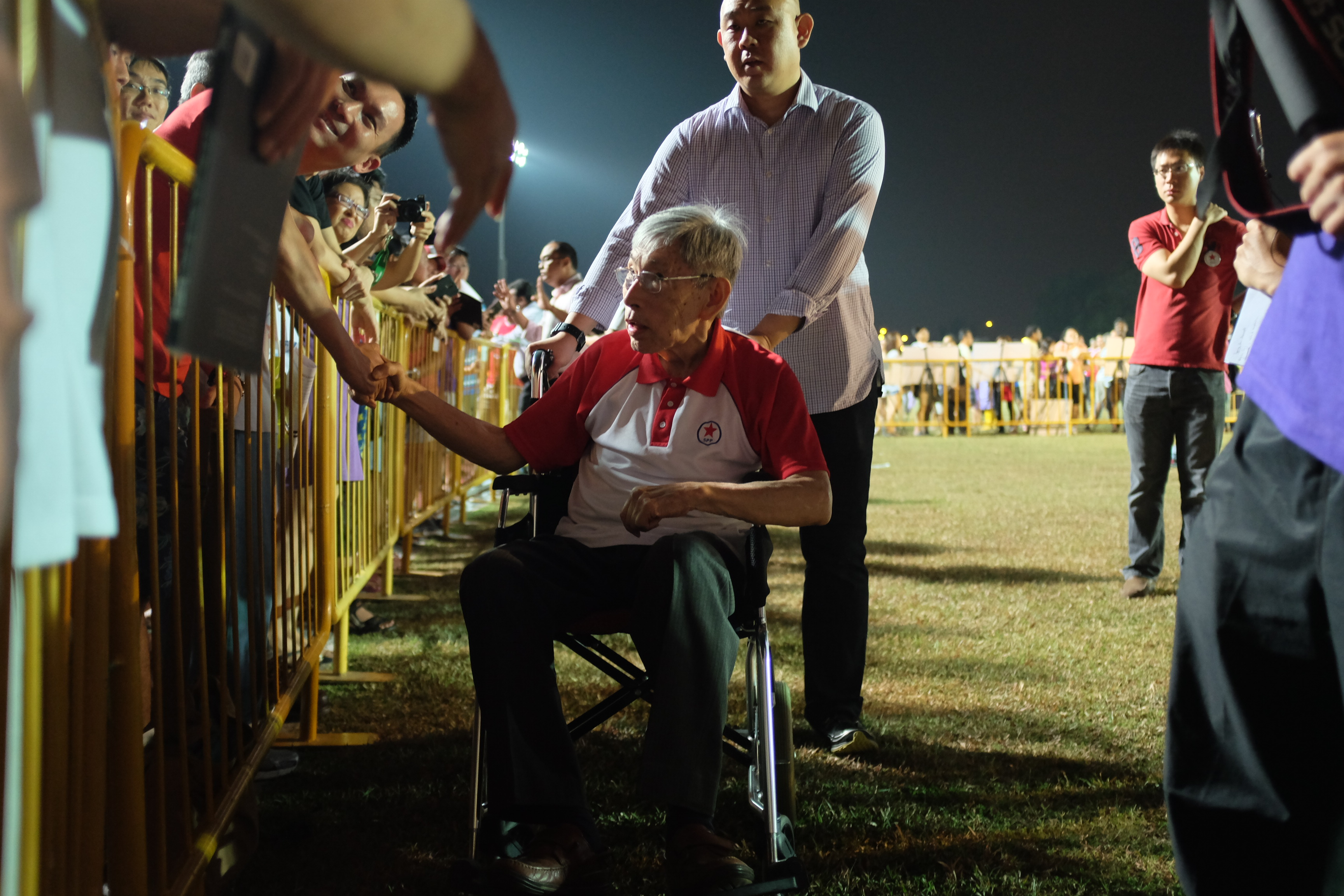
Chiam greeting voters during the campaign period for the 2015 general election.

Between 1997 and 2011, Low Thia Kiang from the Workers' Party and Chiam from the SPP were the only elected opposition MPs.

During the 2011 general election, Low and Chiam left their respective strongholds in Hougang and Potong Pasir SMCs to challenge the ruling People's Action Party (PAP) in group representation constituencies (GRCs). Low contested in Aljunied GRC, while Chiam contested in Bishan–Toa Payoh GRC. In so doing, Low and Chiam risked a situation where there would be no elected opposition MPs in Parliament if they lost.

Chiam's team, which included Benjamin Pwee, Wilfred Leung, Jimmy Lee and Mohamad Hamim bin Aliyas, ultimately lost in Bishan–Toa Payoh GRC with 43.07% of the vote against the PAP team's 56.93%. Chiam's wife, Lina Loh, contested under the SPP banner in Potong Pasir SMC but lost to the PAP candidate Sitoh Yih Pin by a narrow margin of 114 votes (0.72%), garnering 49.64% of the vote against Sitoh's 50.36%. However, Low's gambit paid off as he led the Workers' Party to a historic breakthrough in the election, with a victory in Aljunied GRC. The win was the first time that an opposition party won a GRC. In addition, Loh qualified for a parliamentary seat as a Non-Constituency Member of Parliament in the 12th Parliament and accepted it on 12 May 2011.

=== Retirement from politics ===
On 30 August 2015, Chiam announced that he would not be running for election in the 2015 general election due to his declining health. In the general election that year, the SPP contested in three SMCs and one GRC but lost to the PAP in all four. Lina Loh also lost to Sitoh Yih Pin again in Potong Pasir SMC with 33.61% of the vote against Sitoh's 66.39%.

On 4 September 2019, the SPP announced that Chiam would be resigning from his position as the party's secretary-general due to his declining health. Chiam stepped down on 16 October 2019 and was succeeded by Steve Chia.

== Post-retirement ==
On 9 March 2017, Chiam and Lina Loh launched the Chiam See Tong Sports Fund at the Old Parliament House to help needy athletes achieve their sporting dreams. Chiam and Loh are co-patrons of the organisation, which is chaired by their daughter, Camilla Chiam.

== Personal life ==
Chiam's given name, "See Tong" (时中; Shízhōng), which translates as "punctual" or "timely," was given upon him by his grandfather, Chiam Seng Poh. Poh was a revolutionary involved in the uprisings during the final years of the Qing dynasty preceding the 1911 Revolution. After one such uprising failed, he fled China with his family and settled in Muar, Malaya. Chiam's maternal grandfather, Lim Liang Quee, belonged to the Straits Chinese elite. One of Chiam's maternal aunts, Mabel Lim, married Kwa Soon Siew, who was a brother-in-law of Singapore's first prime minister Lee Kuan Yew.

Chiam's father, Chiam Heng Hong, was a businessman who traded in commodities including rubber, pepper and sugar. His mother, Lily Lim, was instrumental in founding the 7th Singapore Company of the Girls' Brigade at the Prinsep Street Presbyterian Church during the 1950s. Together, Chiam Heng Hong and Lily Lim had two sons: Chiam See Tong and Chiam Joon Tong. In 1973, Chiam met his future wife, Lina Loh, while in London. They married in Singapore in 1975 when Chiam was 40 and Loh was 26, making her 14 years his junior. The couple have one daughter.

== See also ==
- List of Singapore opposition party MPs elected

== Bibliography ==
- Loke, Hoe Yeong (2019). Let the People Have Him: Chiam See Tong: The Early Years. Epigram Books. ISBN 9789810791742.
