= 1992 Marine Parade by-election =

- 19 December 1992
- Registered: 73,986
- Turnout: 68,436 (92.50%) ▼1.07%
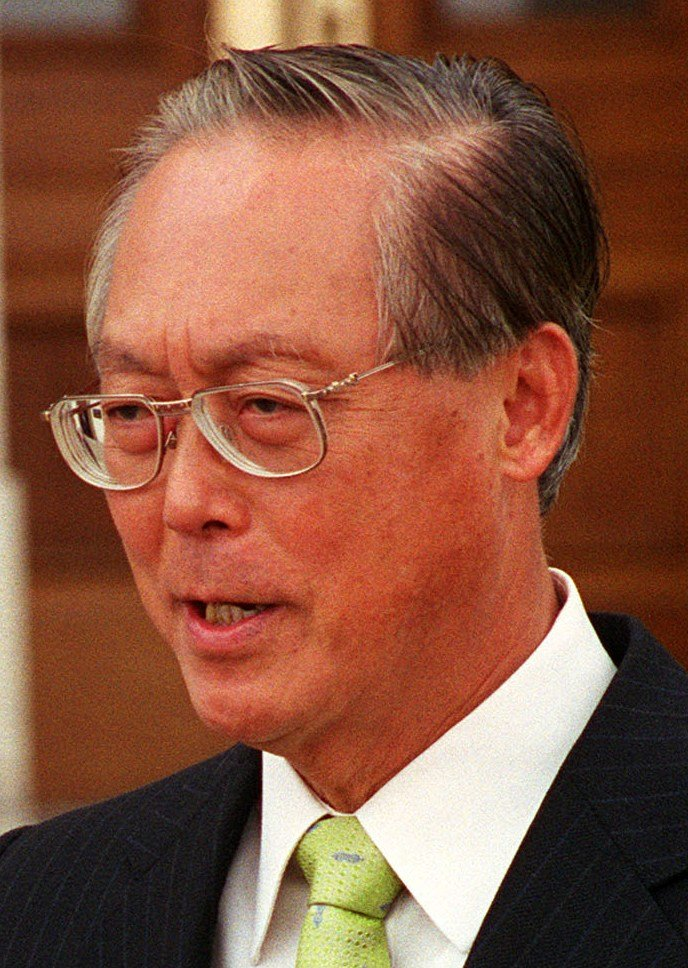

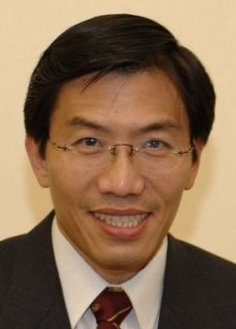
| | First party | Second party |
|---|---|---|
| Candidate | Goh Chok Tong; Othman bin Haron Eusofe; Teo Chee Hean; Matthias Yao | Chee Soon Juan; Low Yong Nguan; Mohamed Shariff bin Yahya; Ashleigh Seow |
| Party | PAP | SDP |
| Popular vote | 48,965 | 16,447 |
| Percentage | 72.94% | 24.5% |
| Swing | ▼4.31% | N/A |
| | Third party | Fourth party |
| Candidate | Ken Sen; Tan Chee Kian; Sarry bin Hassan; Yong Choon Poh | Theng Chin Eng; Yen Kim Khooi; Suib bin Abdul Rahman; Lim Teong Howe |
| Party | NSP | SJP |
| Popular vote | 950 | 764 |
| Percentage | 1.42% | 1.14% |
| Swing | N/A | ▼21.61% |
MPs before election
Goh Chok Tong
Lim Chee Onn
Othman bin Haron Eusofe
Matthias Yao
PAP
Elected MPs
Goh Chok Tong
Othman bin Haron Eusofe
Teo Chee Hean
Matthias Yao
PAP

A parliamentary by-election was held in the Marine Parade Group Representation Constituency in Singapore on 19 December 1992. It was called by Goh Chok Tong, who was the MP of the Marine Parade division and had become prime minister the previous year. He had decided to hold a by-election in his own constituency to get people of "ministerial calibre" to join the government under the People's Action Party (PAP).

This was the first and only time that a Singaporean prime minister had vacated their own constituency to stand for a by-election, thereby producing a risk of Goh losing the premiership in under two years in the event he lost the by-election. On nomination day, the incumbent PAP was challenged by three opposition parties, namely the Singapore Democratic Party, the Singapore Justice Party and the National Solidarity Party; it was the first time in any election a multi-cornered contest occurred inside a Group Representation Constituency (GRC).

On polling day, the PAP team of four were re-elected as the MPs for Marine Parade GRC with 72.94% of the votes against SDP's 24.50%. The remaining two teams did not met the 12.5% threshold required to retain their election deposits of $24,000, four times of that $6,000 election deposit per candidate.

== Background ==
At the time of this by-election, both deputy prime ministers, Ong Teng Cheong and Lee Hsien Loong, were suffering from cancer. Goh decided to hold a by-election in his own constituency for "political self-renewal" and to get people of "ministerial calibre" to join the government under the PAP. While Goh, Othman bin Haron Eusofe and Matthias Yao were running again in the same constituency, Lim Chee Onn was replaced with Teo Chee Hean, the former chief of the Republic of Singapore Navy (RSN), for the by-election. Similarly, the Singapore Democratic Party (SDP), then the largest opposition party with three seats in Parliament, also introduced a charismatic National University of Singapore (NUS) psychology lecturer Chee Soon Juan who led his team into the election.

At the 1991 general election, Goh promised to hold a by-election in 12 to 18 months' time to allow Workers' Party (WP) secretary-general, J. B. Jeyaretnam, to contest a seat in parliament as an act of political goodwill. Jeyaretnam was unable to contest in that general election at the time as his five-year parliamentary ban was to expire two months after. However, the party failed to participate as one candidate turned up late on nomination day on 9 December.

== Candidates ==
On 9 December 1992, the four political parties were nominated, as follows:

| Candidates | Party | Background |
|---|---|---|
| Goh Chok Tong; Othman bin Haron Eusofe; Teo Chee Hean; Matthias Yao | People's Action Party | The PAP team for the GRC was led by Prime Minister Goh, as well as the two incumbent MPs Othman and Yao. Lim Chee Onn did not stand for the by-election, citing work and health reasons, and was replaced by debuting candidate Teo Chee Hean, a 37-year-old reservist commodore of the Republic of Singapore Navy. |
| Chee Soon Juan; Low Yong Nguan; Ashleigh Seow; Mohamed Shariff bin Yahya | Singapore Democratic Party | Then the largest opposition party at the time, the SDP party comprises electoral debutant Chee, a 30-year-old neuro-psychology lecturer of the National University of Singapore, and three other candidates Low, Seow and Shariff, who had contested in prior elections before. Low was also a former PAP MP in Crawford Constituency in the 1968 election before retiring a term later, then joined SDP sometime before the 1988 elections. |
| Sarry bin Hassan; Ken Sen; Tan Chee Kian; Paul Yong Choon Poh | National Solidarity Party | The NSP team comprises three returning candidates, and electoral debutant Yong, a 42-year-old businessman. |
| Lim Teong Howe; Suib bin Abdul Rahman; Theng Chin Eng; Yen Kim Khooi | Singapore Justice Party | The SJP once contested Marine Parade GRC in the preceding 1991 general election, where they lost to PAP with a vote of 22.75%-77.25%. Their team consist of returning candidates Suib and Theng, Yen, an independent candidate for Mountbatten SMC from the same election, and electoral debutant Lim, a 43-year-old businessman. |

== Results ==
By-election 1992: Marine Parade GRC
| Party | Candidate | Votes | % | ±% |
|---|---|---|---|---|
| PAP | Goh Chok Tong Othman bin Haron Eusofe Teo Chee Hean Matthias Yao | 48,965 | 72.94 | ▼4.31 |
| SDP | Chee Soon Juan Low Yong Nguan Mohamed Shariff bin Yahya Ashleigh Seow | 16,447 | 24.5 | N/A |
| NSP | Ken Sen Tan Chee Kian Sarry bin Hassan Yong Choon Poh | 950 | 1.42 | N/A |
| SJP | Theng Chin Eng Yen Kim Khooi Suib bin Abdul Rahman Lim Teong Howe | 764 | 1.14 | ▼21.61 |
| Majority | | 30,804 | 48.44 | ▼6.06 |
| Turnout | | 68,436 | 92.5 | ▼1.1 |
| PAP hold | | Swing | ▼4.3 | |

== Aftermath and legacy ==
Following the by-election, Chee Soon Juan had received acclaim in public interest towards their supporters of Singapore Democratic Party, but on the following year, a party dispute ensued between him and Chiam See Tong; Chiam was expelled from the party's CEC but won a lawsuit to retain his Potong Pasir SMC seat and his position on procedure grounds, which lead to the formation of Singapore People's Party (SPP) in 1994; Chiam also later formed the Singapore Democratic Alliance (SDA) in 2001 along with the two teams who also contested the by-election: the National Solidarity Party (NSP) and Singapore Justice Party (SJP), as well as Singapore Malay National Organisation (PKMS). However, the SDA was left with PKMS and SJP after the NSP later left the alliance in 2007, followed by SPP in 2010. In SDP, Chee then became the party's Secretary-General till this day, though the party were unsuccessful on winning seats in subsequent attempts, including MacPherson SMC where he publicly challenged Matthias Yao in the next election.

The PAP's team was re-sworn in Parliament a month later on 18 January 1993; Goh would continue to hold his premiership until 2004, and remained as MP for Marine Parade until his retirement in 2020. Teo Chee Hean left Marine Parade GRC to contest in the brand-new Pasir Ris GRC in the subsequent election until 2025, where he was the last MP in the team to retire.

=== Subsequent elections ===
Marine Parade's next electoral competition was in 2011, 19 years later, where the NSP challenged there. Similarly, the next by-election where SDP would be involved with was in 2016, with Chee facing against Murali Pillai in the seat of Bukit Batok SMC.

The WP would eventually contest Marine Parade GRC in 2015, 23 years later, which was led by former Non-constituency Member of Parliament Yee Jenn Jong, who previously contested Joo Chiat SMC in 2011, which was redrawn back into Marine Parade GRC in that election. However, they did not contest in the 2025 election citing limitation of resources and the extensive boundary changes of the constituency (among which Joo Chiat was redrawn into East Coast GRC), which resulted in Marine Parade GRC, now Marine Parade–Braddell Heights GRC, to become uncontested for the first time since 2006.

The next time a Group Representation Constituency witnessed a multi-cornered contest was in 2020, where a three-way race unfolded in Pasir Ris–Punggol GRC between the PAP, whose team coincidentally included Teo, the SDA, and the new Peoples Voice. A similar four-cornered contest in a Group Representation Constituency would occur again 33 years later in the 2025 election where PAP, WP, NSP and the new People's Power Party (PPP) challenged Tampines GRC, and just like the 1992 by-election and the 2013 Punggol East by-election (the other instance of a four-cornered by-election contest), the two smaller parties (NSP and PPP in this case) had also forfeited their election deposits.
