= List of elected Singaporean Members of Parliament from opposition parties =

This is a list of members of the Parliament of Singapore who have been directly elected as representatives of an opposition party since 1968, having secured victory in electoral divisions.

In Singapore, the People's Action Party (PAP) has governed continuously since 1959, when Singapore was a British colony, maintaining a supermajority in Parliament. Consequently, the presence of opposition Members of Parliament (MP) has remained limited. Although Singapore became independent in 1965, it was not until 1981 that a non-PAP MP was directly elected in independent Singapore.

This list excludes non-constituency MPs (NCMPs). Group representation constituencies (GRCs) were introduced at the 1988 general election, while constituencies with a single MP were renamed single-member constituencies (SMCs). However, it was not until 23 years later that an opposition party achieved victory in one; the Workers' Party (WP) created that record by gaining Aljunied GRC from the PAP in the 2011 general election. The WP has remained the most prominent opposition force in Singaporean politics, with 19 distinct WP politicians having been directly elected to Parliament in post-independence Singapore.

== List ==
Election	MP(s)	Constituency	Party	Parliament	Number of NCMPs appointed
1981 (b)	J. B. Jeyaretnam	Anson	Workers' Party (WP)	5th	Scheme did not exist
1984	Chiam See Tong	Potong Pasir	Singapore Democratic Party (SDP)	6th	1
1984	J. B. Jeyaretnam	Anson	WP	6th	1
1988	Chiam See Tong	Potong Pasir SMC	SDP	7th	2
1991	Cheo Chai Chen	Nee Soon Central SMC	SDP	8th	N/A
1991	Chiam See Tong	Potong Pasir SMC	SDP	8th	N/A
1991	Ling How Doong	Bukit Gombak SMC	SDP	8th	N/A
1991	Low Thia Khiang	Hougang SMC	WP	8th	N/A
1997	Chiam See Tong	Potong Pasir SMC	Singapore People's Party (SPP)	9th	1
1997	Low Thia Khiang	Hougang SMC	WP	9th	1
2001	Chiam See Tong	Potong Pasir SMC	Singapore Democratic Alliance (SDA)	10th	1
2001	Low Thia Khiang	Hougang SMC	WP	10th	1
2006	Chiam See Tong	Potong Pasir SMC	SDA	11th	1
2006	Low Thia Khiang	Hougang SMC	WP	11th	1
2011	Chen Show Mao; Sylvia Lim; Low Thia Khiang; Faisal Manap; Pritam Singh	Aljunied GRC	WP	12th	3
2011	Yaw Shin Leong	Hougang SMC	WP	12th	3
2012 (b)	Png Eng Huat	Hougang SMC	WP	12th	N/A
2013 (b)	Lee Li Lian	Punggol East SMC	WP	12th	N/A
2015	Chen Show Mao; Sylvia Lim; Low Thia Khiang; Faisal Manap; Pritam Singh	Aljunied GRC	WP	13th	3
2015	Png Eng Huat	Hougang SMC	WP	13th	3
2020	Gerald Giam; Sylvia Lim; Faisal Manap; Leon Perera; Pritam Singh	Aljunied GRC	WP	14th	2
2020	Dennis Tan	Hougang SMC	WP	14th	2
2020	Louis Chua; He Ting Ru; Jamus Lim; Raeesah Khan	Sengkang GRC	WP	14th	2
2025	Fadli Fawzi; Gerald Giam; Sylvia Lim; Pritam Singh; Kenneth Tiong	Aljunied GRC	WP	15th	2
2025	Dennis Tan	Hougang SMC	WP	15th	2
2025	Abdul Muhaimin; Louis Chua; He Ting Ru; Jamus Lim	Sengkang GRC	WP	15th	2

(b) = by-election

== See also ==
- Leader of the Opposition (Singapore)
