= MacPherson Single Member Constituency =

Former constituency in Singapore

Coordinates: 1.325°N 103.887°E

MacPherson
- Former single-member constituency for the Parliament of Singapore
- Region: Central Region, Singapore
- Electorate: 28,513

Former constituency
- Created: 1968; 58 years ago
- Abolished: 2025; 1 year ago
- Seats: 1
- Member: Constituency abolished
- Town Council: Marine Parade
- Reformed: 1997, 2015
- Reformed from: Marine Parade GRC
- Merged: 1991, 2011, 2025
- Merged into: Marine Parade GRC (1991, 2011); Marine Parade–Braddell Heights GRC (2025)

The MacPherson Single Member Constituency was a single-member constituency (SMC) in central Singapore. At abolition, it was managed by Marine Parade Town Council.

== History ==
=== First existence (1968–1991) ===
MacPherson Constituency was created for the 1968 general election, with Chua Sian Chin from the governing People's Action Party (PAP) winning unopposed. He would retain the constituency, both unopposed and against different opposition candidates, until the 1991 general election, when it was abolished and merged into Marine Parade Group Representation Constituency (GRC).

In 1988, the constituency was renamed MacPherson Single Member Constituency with the creation of GRCs.

=== Second existence (1997–2011) ===
In 1994, Chee Soon Juan, the leader of the Singapore Democratic Party (SDP), challenged Matthias Yao, the incumbent PAP Member of Parliament (MP) for the MacPherson division of Marine Parade GRC, to an SMC contest amid an antagonistic exchange of letters between the two in The Straits Times regarding Chee's integrity. MacPherson SMC was thus reformed for the 1997 general election.

In the election, Yao won 65.14% of the vote. He would retain the SMC until the 2011 general election, when it was merged again into Marine Parade GRC.

=== Third existence (2015–2025) ===
For the 2015 general election, the National Solidarity Party (NSP), which had contested Marine Parade GRC in 2011, initially planned to field a candidate against the PAP in MacPherson SMC, but decided to pull out of the contest when the Workers' Party (WP) announced its desire to contest in the constituency. The NSP later backtracked and fielded Steve Chia in the constituency, but Chia quit citing online abuse over his participation. As a result, the party fielded Cheo Chai Chen. Hazel Poa, then the acting secretary-general of the NSP, resigned from the party, stating that she opposed the decision of the Central Executive Committee (CEC) to contest the SMC.

During the election campaign, Cheo drew considerable criticism for telling reporters that PAP candidate Tin Pei Ling's status as a new mother was "her weakness" and saying that it was possible that she would spend more time on her child than on her constituents. He later claimed that he was joking. Tin, the incumbent MP for the MacPherson division of Marine Parade GRC, won the election with 65.58% of the vote; Bernard Chen from the WP received 33.6% and Cheo received 0.82%. For not winning at least 12.5% of the vote, Cheo forfeited his election deposit of S$14,500.

During the 2020 general election, Tin retained MacPherson SMC with an improved 71.74% of the vote against Goh Meng Seng, the founder and leader of the People's Power Party (PPP). This was despite a national swing against the PAP.

For the 2025 general election, the SMC was abolished and merged into Marine Parade–Braddell Heights GRC.

== Members of Parliament ==
Election	Member	Party
Formation
1968	Chua Sian Chin	PAP
1972	Chua Sian Chin	PAP
1976	Chua Sian Chin	PAP
1980	Chua Sian Chin	PAP
1984	Chua Sian Chin	PAP
1988	Chua Sian Chin	PAP
Constituency abolished (1991 – 1997)
1997	Matthias Yao	PAP
2001	Matthias Yao	PAP
2006	Matthias Yao	PAP
Constituency abolished (2011 – 2015)
2015	Tin Pei Ling	PAP
2020	Tin Pei Ling	PAP
Constituency abolished (2025)

== Electoral results ==
Note: The Elections Department does not include rejected votes when calculating the vote shares of candidates. Hence, all candidates' vote shares will total to 100% at any given election (may not appear so in multi-way contests due to rounding).

=== Elections in 1960s ===
General Election 1968: MacPherson
Party	Candidate	Votes	%
PAP	Chua Sian Chin	Unopposed	
Registered electors		13,099	
PAP win (new seat)			

=== Elections in 1970s ===
General Election 1972: MacPherson
Party	Candidate	Votes	%	±%
PAP	Chua Sian Chin	10,117	68.76	N/A
WP	Lee Tow Kiat	4,597	31.24	N/A
Majority		5,520	37.52	N/A
Registered electors		15,637		
Total valid votes		14,714	98.41	
Rejected ballots		238	1.59	N/A
Turnout		14,952	95.62	N/A
PAP hold				

General Election 1976: MacPherson
Party	Candidate	Votes	%	±%
PAP	Chua Sian Chin	Unopposed		
Registered electors		18,716		
PAP hold				

=== Elections in 1980s ===
General Election 1980: MacPherson
Party	Candidate	Votes	%	±%
PAP	Chua Sian Chin	15,280	86.89	N/A
United People's Front	Darus bin Shariff	2,306	13.11	N/A
Majority		12,974	73.78	N/A
Registered electors		18,997		
Total valid votes		17,586	97.18	
Rejected ballots		510	2.82	N/A
Turnout		18,096	95.26	N/A
PAP hold				

General Election 1984: MacPherson
Party	Candidate	Votes	%	±%
PAP	Chua Sian Chin	Unopposed		
Registered electors		19,500		
PAP hold				

General Election 1988: MacPherson
Party	Candidate	Votes	%	±%
PAP	Chua Sian Chin	10,453	65.98	
NSP	Kum Teng Hock	5,390	34.02	
Majority		5,063	31.96	
Registered electors		17,063		
Total valid votes		15,843	97.81	
Rejected ballots		354	2.19	
Turnout		16,197	94.92	
PAP hold		Swing	▼2.78	

=== Elections in 1990s ===
General Election 1997: MacPherson
Party	Candidate	Votes	%
PAP	Matthias Yao	12,546	65.14
SDP	Chee Soon Juan	6,713	34.86
Majority		5,833	30.28
Registered electors		20,734	
Total valid votes		19,259	97.17
Rejected ballots		561	2.83
Turnout		19,820	95.59
PAP win (new seat)			

=== Elections in 2000s ===
General Election 2001: MacPherson
Party	Candidate	Votes	%	±%
PAP	Matthias Yao	16,870	83.73	▲18.59
DPP	Tan Soo Phuan	3,277	16.27	N/A
Majority		13,593	67.46	▲37.18
Registered electors		22,010		
Total valid votes		20,147	97.22	▲0.05
Rejected ballots		577	2.78	▼0.05
Turnout		20,724	94.16	▼1.43
PAP hold		Swing	▲18.59	

General Election 2006: MacPherson
Party	Candidate	Votes	%	±%
PAP	Matthias Yao	13,184	68.48	▼15.25
SDA	Sin Kek Tong	6,067	31.52	N/A
Majority		7,117	36.96	▼30.50
Registered electors		21,041		
Total valid votes		19,251		
Rejected ballots		544	2.75	▼0.03
Turnout		19,795	94.08	▼0.08
PAP hold		Swing	▼15.25	

=== Elections in 2010s ===
General Election 2015: MacPherson
Party	Candidate	Votes	%
PAP	Tin Pei Ling	17,227	65.58
WP	Bernard Chen	8,826	33.60
NSP	Cheo Chai Chen	215	0.82
Majority		8,401	31.98
Registered electors		28,511	
Total valid votes		26,268	98.44
Rejected ballots		415	1.56
Turnout		26,683	93.59
PAP win (new seat)			

=== Elections in 2020s ===
General Election 2020: MacPherson
Party	Candidate	Votes	%	±%
PAP	Tin Pei Ling	19,009	71.74	▲6.16
PPP	Goh Meng Seng	7,489	28.26	N/A
Majority		11,520	43.48	▲11.50
Total valid votes		26,498	97.70	▼0.74
Rejected ballots		625	2.30	▲0.74
Turnout		27,123	95.13	▲1.54
Registered electors		28,513		▲6.86
PAP hold		Swing	▲6.16	
