= Matthias Yao =

Singaporean politician (born 1956)

- 姚智

Deputy Speaker of the Parliament of Singapore
- In office 8 November 2006 – 18 April 2011 Serving with Indranee Rajah
- Prime Minister: Lee Hsien Loong
- Speaker: Abdullah Tarmugi
- Preceded by: S. Iswaran
- Succeeded by: Seah Kian Peng

Mayor of South East District
- In office 3 January 2001 – 7 May 2011
- Prime Minister: Goh Chok Tong; Lee Hsien Loong
- Preceded by: Position established
- Succeeded by: Maliki Osman

Member of the Singapore Parliament for MacPherson SMC
- In office 3 January 1997 – 7 May 2011
- Preceded by: Himself (Marine Parade GRC – MacPherson)
- Succeeded by: Tin Pei Ling (Marine Parade GRC – MacPherson)
- Majority: Walkover

Member of the Singapore Parliament for Marine Parade GRC (MacPherson)
- In office 1 September 1991 – 2 January 1997
- Preceded by: Chua Sian Chin (MacPherson SMC)
- Succeeded by: Himself (MacPherson SMC)

Personal details
- Born: Matthias Yao Chih; 12 January 1956 (age 70) Colony of Singapore
- Party: People's Action Party
- Occupation: Politician

Matthias Yao Chih (Note: Chinese: 姚智; pinyin: Yáo Zhì) (born 12 January 1956) is a Singaporean former politician. A former member of the governing People's Action Party (PAP), he was a Member of Parliament (MP) representing Marine Parade Group Representation Constituency between 1991 and 1997, and MacPherson Single Member Constituency between 1997 and 2011.

During his political career, he had served as a Senior Minister of State in the Prime Minister's Office, the Mayor of the South East District and Deputy Speaker of the Parliament.

== Education ==
Yao had his early education at St Anthony's Boys' School, St Joseph's Institution and National Junior College. In 1975, he was awarded a Singapore Armed Forces Overseas Merit Scholarship to study at the University of Birmingham in the United Kingdom, where he graduated in 1978 with a Bachelor of Commerce (Honours) degree.

== Career ==
A Chinese Singaporean, Yao was a civil servant before he entered politics. He served as the deputy director (Police and Security) at the Ministry of Home Affairs from 1980 to 1981, and the deputy director (Planning) at the Ministry of Finance's Public Service Division from 1982 to 1984. From 1984 to 1986, he served at the Ministry of Community Development as the Deputy Directory (Community Relations) and Head of the Feedback Unit. He was the deputy director (Public Communications) at the Ministry of Communications and Information from 1986 to 1988.

In 1988, Yao became the Political Secretary to Goh Chok Tong, who was then Singapore's First Deputy Prime Minister.

Yao was elected to Parliament at the 1991 general election as an MP for the Marine Parade Group Representation Constituency. He remained part of the PAP's team at the Marine Parade by-election in 1992, and was re-elected.

Yao was made a Parliamentary Secretary at the Ministry of Defence in 1991. In 1994, he was promoted to Senior Parliamentary Secretary at the Ministry of Defence and Ministry of National Development.

In 1994, Yao was publicly challenged by the secretary general of the opposition Singapore Democratic Party (SDP), Dr Chee Soon Juan, to stand against him in a single member constituency at the next general election. This happened following a series of letters which Yao and Chee wrote to The Straits Times. Chee had initially written to the newspaper to respond to criticisms that Deputy Prime Minister Lee Hsien Loong had made of his book Dare to Change, and Yao then responded in his capacity as the PAP's Second Organising Secretary. This led to a two-month-long exchange of letters between the pair which were published in the paper, which ended with Chee issuing his challenge to Yao. At Yao's request, Prime Minister Goh Chok Tong agreed to separate Yao's MacPherson ward from the rest of the Marine Parade Group Representation Constituency at the next general election so that Yao could take up Chee's challenge. At the 1997 general election, Yao defeated Chee by 12,546 votes (65.1%) to 6,713 (34.9%). Yao was subsequently re-elected as the MP for MacPherson at the 2001 and 2006 general elections.

After the 1997 general election, Yao was made a Minister of State at the Ministry of Defence. In 1999, he became a Minister of State at the Prime Minister's Office. He was promoted to Senior Minister of State in 2001. During his time at the Prime Minister's office, Yao also served as the Deputy Secretary General of the National Trades Union Congress (NTUC).

In 2004, Yao left the Prime Minister's Office and became the Mayor of the South East District of Singapore. In 2006 he was made a Deputy Speaker of Parliament.

Prior to the 2011 general election, Yao announced that he was retiring from politics and would not be standing as a candidate. His MacPherson ward was subsumed back into the Marine Parade Group Representation Constituency for the election, and after the election responsibility for the ward was taken over by Tin Pei Ling, whom Yao had previously mentored.

== Personal life ==
Yao is married with two children.

== Notes ==
Parliament of Singapore
Preceded by Chua Sian Chin as MP for MacPherson SMC	Member of Parliament for Marine Parade GRC (MacPherson); 1991 – 1997	Succeeded by Himself as MP for MacPherson SMC
Preceded by Himself as MP for Marine Parade GRC (MacPherson)	Member of Parliament for MacPherson SMC; 1997 – 2011	Succeeded by Tin Pei Ling as MP for Marine Parade GRC (MacPherson)
Preceded by S. Iswaran	Deputy Speaker of Parliament; 2006 – 2011; Served alongside: Indranee Rajah	Succeeded by Seah Kian Peng
Government offices
Preceded by Position established	Mayor of South East District; 2001 – 2011	Succeeded by Maliki Osman
