= Chee Soon Juan =

Singaporean politician

Dr. Chee Soon Juan
- 徐顺全
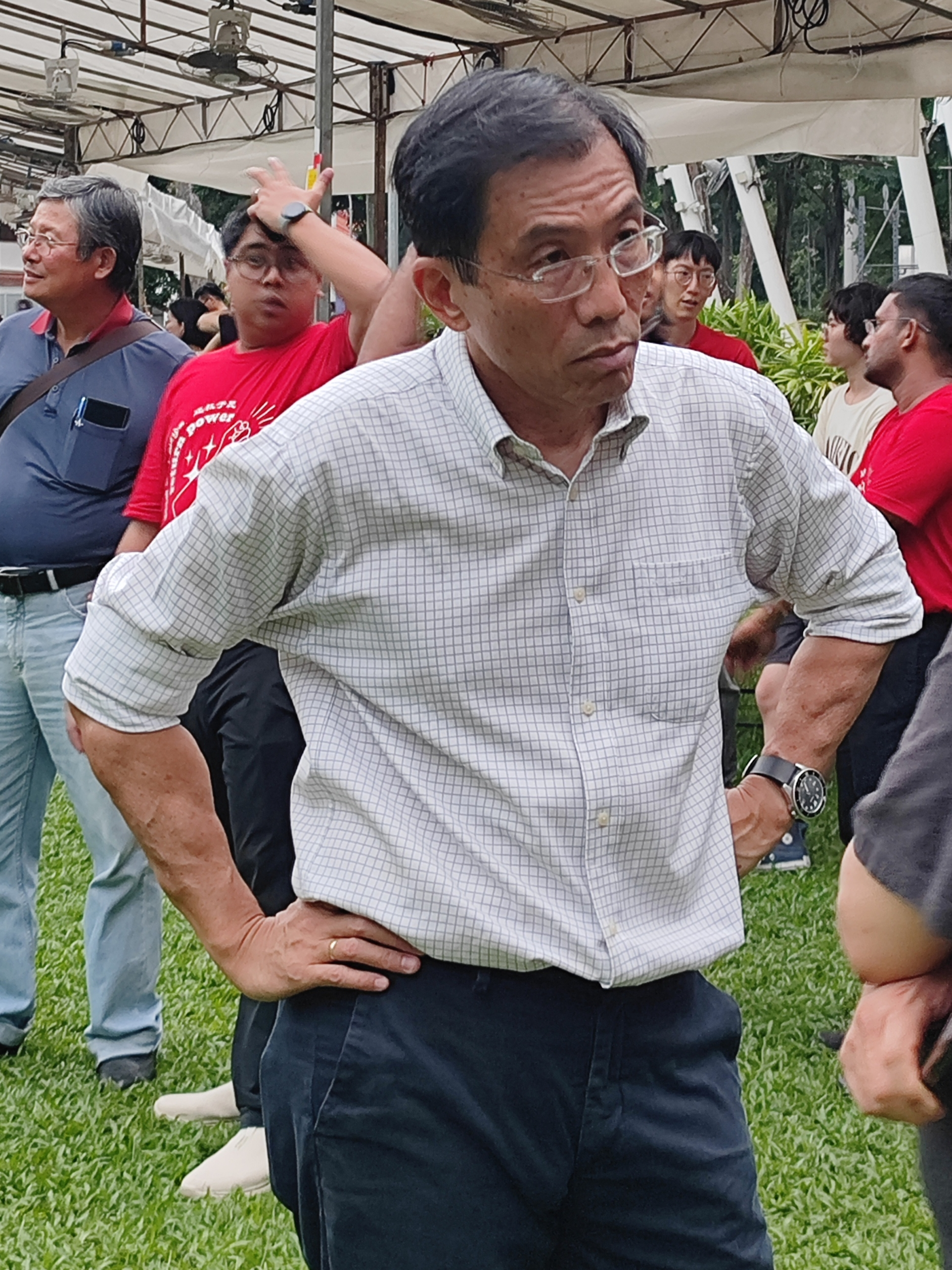
- Chee in 2026

2nd Secretary-General of the Singapore Democratic Party
- Incumbent
- Assumed office 18 June 1993
- Preceded by: Chiam See Tong
- Chairman: Ling How Doong; Gandhi Ambalam; Jufrie Mahmood; Jeffrey George; Wong Souk Yee; Paul Tambyah

Personal details
- Born: 20 July 1962 (age 64) State of Singapore
- Party: Singapore Democratic Party
- Spouse: Huang Chih-Mei (m. 1992)
- Children: 3
- Relatives: Chee Siok Chin (sister)
- Education: Mansfield University (BS); University of Georgia (PhD)
- Occupation: Politician; activist
- Website: cheesoonjuan.com

Chinese name
- Simplified Chinese: 徐顺全
- Traditional Chinese: 徐順全
Transcriptions
Standard Mandarin
- Hanyu Pinyin: Xú Shùnquán
Southern Min
- Hokkien POJ: Chhî Sūn-choân

Chee Soon Juan (born 20 July 1962) is a Singaporean politician, activist, and former lecturer who has been the secretary-general of the Singapore Democratic Party (SDP) since 1993.

Prior to entering politics in 1992, Chee was a lecturer at the National University of Singapore (NUS). He was invited by Chiam See Tong to join the SDP, and was a member of the SDP's team that stood in the 1992 Marine Parade by-election. Chee subsequently succeeded Chiam as the party's secretary-general after Chiam, whom Chee and the rest of the party's leadership have had a number of disagreements with, left the party. The party had three Members of Parliament (MPs) when Chee took over as secretary-general, but lost all its seats at the 1997 general election and has not had any elected members since.

Chee has been arrested and jailed several times for his political activities, mainly for making unauthorised public speeches as well as staging demonstrations without a police permit. He has also deemed liable for defamation on multiple occasions for comments he has made about members of the country's governing People's Action Party (PAP). He was previously barred from standing in parliamentary elections because he was declared bankrupt in 2006, after failing to pay damages from a lawsuit owed to Prime Ministers Lee Kuan Yew and Goh Chok Tong.

On 24 September 2012, Chee announced that he had raised the reduced sum of $30,000 which was accepted by Lee and Goh to annul his bankruptcy, which has since enabled him to contest in subsequent general elections from 2015. However, as a perennial candidate, he has never won an election since he first contested in 1992.

== Early life and education ==
Chee attended Anglo-Chinese School and National Junior College before graduating from Mansfield University with a Bachelor of Science degree in psychology.

In 1990, he went on to complete a PhD at the University of Georgia. Upon graduation, Chee returned to Singapore to take up a teaching position in the Department of Psychology at the National University of Singapore.

== Political career ==
In 1992, Chee was recruited to join the Singapore Democratic Party (SDP) by the party's founder and secretary-general, Chiam See Tong. Chee was first introduced to the public as a member of the SDP's team to stand in the 1992 Marine Parade by-election in the Marine Parade Group Representation Constituency (GRC). His candidacy attracted considerable public interest as it was the first time that an academic from a state-run university had stood against the governing People's Action Party in an election. The SDP team was unsuccessful in the election, with the PAP winning 72.94% of the votes, the SDP 24.50%, and other parties 2.56%.

Shortly after the Marine Parade by-election, Chee became the SDP's assistant secretary-general.

=== Hunger strike ===
In 1993, a few months after Chee joined the SDP, he was dismissed from NUS by the Head of the Psychology Department, S. Vasoo, who was also a PAP MP at the time, for allegedly using research funds to send his wife's doctoral thesis to the United States and making false transport claims. Chee denied that he had misused university funds and claimed that he was the victim of a political vendetta. On 5 April, he staged a hunger strike to protest his firing. On the second day of his hunger strike, Chee was advised to consume glucose water instead of plain water by a doctor who was checking on his health daily; he accepted the advice. He ended the strike on the tenth day, 14 April.

Although Chiam initially backed Chee, he became critical of Chee's hunger strike and his public comments condemning the PAP for his dismissal from NUS. Chiam wanted to censure Chee for his comments, but the party's Central Executive Committee (CEC) backed Chee. Chiam then resigned as secretary-general of the party. Chee, as the assistant secretary-general, then became the party's acting secretary-general and was subsequently elected as secretary-general in 1993.

After Chiam publicly criticised the CEC, they attempted to expel him from the party—an act which would have forced him to vacate his seat in Parliament—but Chiam won a court case to prevent them from doing so on procedural grounds. Chiam remained an SDP member and MP until shortly before the 1997 general election, when he left to join the Singapore People's Party (SPP), a party founded in 1994 by ex-SDP members who supported him.

=== Leadership of the Singapore Democratic Party ===
After taking over as the SDP's secretary-general, Chee began regularly travelling abroad and to talk about his views on how "democracy is limited" in Singapore to foreign media, especially in Western countries. He also published his second political book, Dare to Change: An Alternative Vision for Singapore. In 1994, in response to criticisms of the book made by then Deputy Prime Minister Lee Hsien Loong, Chee wrote a letter to The Straits Times. The PAP's Second Organising Secretary, Matthias Yao, then wrote to the newspaper to reply to Chee's comments. This led to a two-month-long exchange of letters between Chee and Yao in the newspaper that ended with Chee issuing a challenge to Yao to stand against him in a single member constituency at the next general election. At Yao's request, Prime Minister Goh Chok Tong agreed to separate Yao's MacPherson ward from the rest of Marine Parade GRC at the next general election so that he could take up Chee's challenge. At the 1997 general election Chee lost the election, garnering only 34.86% of the vote to Yao's 65.14%.

The SDP's first general election under Chee's leadership in 1997 proved to be a major setback for the party as they failed to win any seats in Parliament. Ling How Doong and Cheo Chai Chen were defeated in their bids to be re-elected as MPs.

==== Defamation suits and bankruptcy ====
At the 2001 general election, Chee stood as one of the SDP's candidates in the Jurong Group Representation Constituency. The SDP's team lost to the PAP team, winning only 20.25% of the votes while the PAP won 79.75%. The SDP's candidates were also unsuccessful in all the other constituencies in which they stood.

During the run-up to the election, Chee attracted attention in the media when he encountered Prime Minister Goh Chok Tong while campaigning at a hawker centre. He used a megaphone to ask the Prime Minister, "Where is the $18 billion that you have lent to [Indonesian President] Suharto?" The PAP took Chee to task for this, claiming that any accusation that Parliament had been misled about an alleged loan to Suharto was untrue, and demanding that he either apologise or face a defamation lawsuit. Although Chee apologised a day later, he subsequently retracted his apology.

After the election, Chee was sued for defamation by Prime Minister Goh Chok Tong and former Prime Minister Lee Kuan Yew. Chee lost the lawsuits and was ordered to pay damages of $300,000 to Goh and $200,000 to Lee.

On 10 February 2006, Chee was declared bankrupt by the High Court after failing to pay the damages owed to Goh and Lee. As an undischarged bankrupt, Chee became ineligible to stand in general elections and was required to seek a court-appointed Official Assignee's permission before making any trips abroad. In April, Chee was stopped at Changi Airport as he was preparing to board a flight to Istanbul as he had not obtained his Official Assignee's approval.

At the 2011 general election, Chee led the SDP into the contest. Although he was barred from standing due to his undischarged bankruptcy, he assembled a team of individuals to stand as candidates. The party had envisioned its best team to stand in Holland-Bukit Timah GRC. Its candidates included Tan Jee Say, Ang Yong Guan, Vincent Wijeysingha, and Michelle Lee Juen. The team lost, attaining 39.92% of the vote.

On 11 September 2012, both Lee and Goh said they had no objection to accepting Chee's offer to pay the reduced sum of $30,000 to annul his bankruptcy. On 24 September, Chee announced that he had raised the $30,000 from the sale of his latest book, Democratically Speaking, and would be making payment to the Official Assignee in the course of that week. On 23 November, Chee was formally cleared of bankruptcy upon being issued a Certificate of Annulment by the Official Assignee. This allowed him to travel freely outside of Singapore, as well as stand in future General Elections.

==== Contesting elections ====
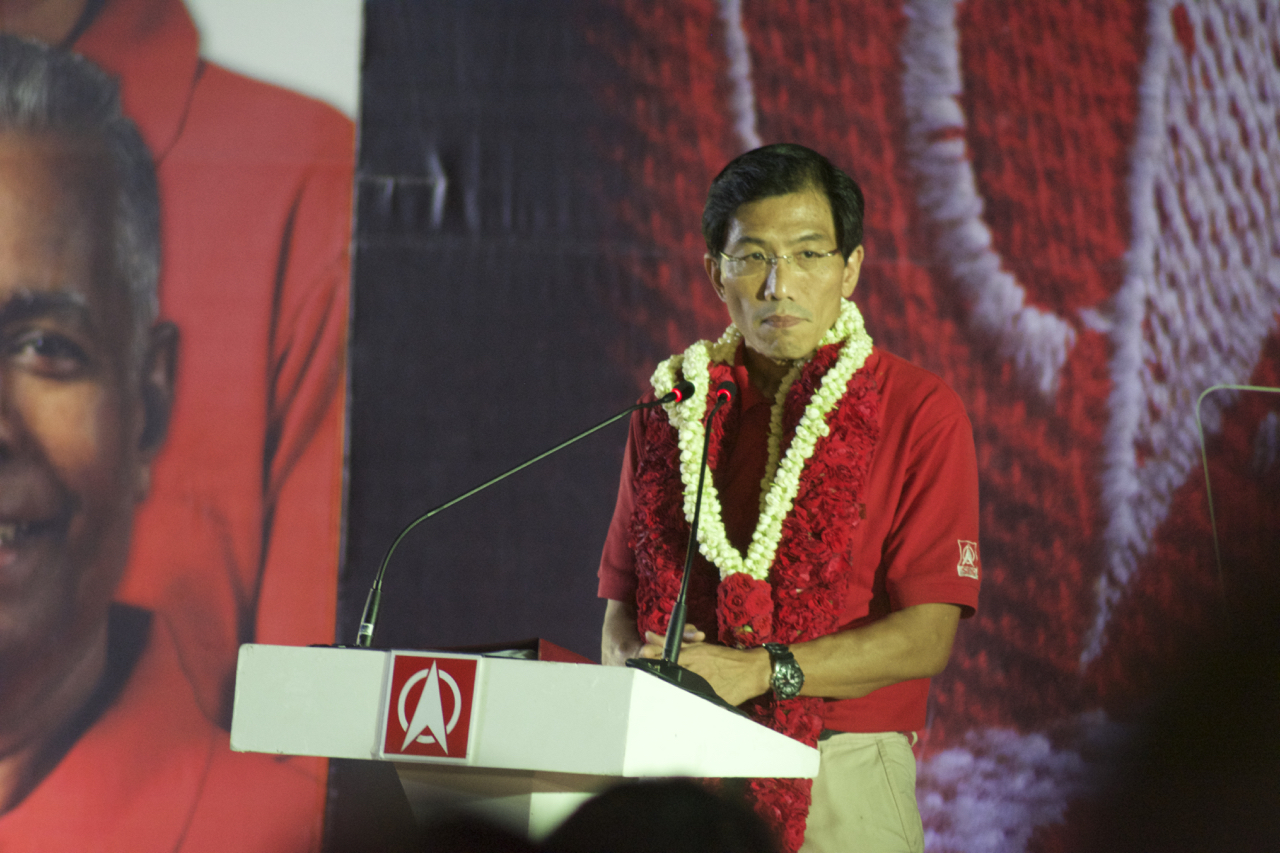
Chee Soon Juan at a Singapore Democratic Party rally during the 2015 general election

Chee contested as a candidate of Singapore Democratic Party along with Paul Tambyah, Sidek Mallek, and Chong Wai Fung for the Holland-Bukit Timah GRC in the 2015 general elections. He began his campaign by raising the issue of the high cost of living in Singapore, stressing that there was a need for Singaporeans to have an alternative voice in Parliament. In subsequent election rallies, Chee unveiled the SDP's proposals, which included the raising of personal income taxes on the top 1% of taxpayers to the year-2000 level, the introduction of a minimum wage, as well as the creation of a national healthcare plan to be funded by cutting the defence budget by 40%. In response, the PAP team described the proposals as "unrealistic", saying that the SDP's policies involved "tax-and-spend" programmes that would set Singapore "on the road to (debt-stricken) Greece". Chee responded by saying the PAP had previously criticised the SDP's ideas, only to adopt them later. According to Chee, the SDP had in the past proposed pooling individual healthcare risks, an idea that has been adopted by the Government, through the implementation of the MediShield Life universal healthcare insurance scheme, as well as the Government's Fair Consideration Framework, which he stated was an adoption of the SDP's proposal that employers must try hiring Singaporeans first before considering foreigners.

At a PAP rally on 7 September 2015, Vivian Balakrishnan also called to attention Chee's role in ousting Chiam as secretary-general of SDP in 1993, saying that the PAP "did not have a tradition of 'backstabbing' its mentors". In response, Chee, as well as the SDP's Marsiling-Yew Tee GRC candidate Bryan Lim, provided an account of the incidents that led to Chiam's resignation on the party's website, saying that Chiam resigned on his own accord. Lina Chiam, Chiam's wife and the chairperson of SPP, confirmed that the two sides had held "friendly talk" on the issue. At the same PAP rally, Sim Ann accused Chee of being adept at "chut pattern", a Singlish phrase meaning being full of antics. Chee responded the following day at a SDP rally by stating that he would not respond to personal attacks and would stay focused on policy issues during the election season, saying, "If you attack, you attack the policy, not the person... In football terms, you play the ball, not the man." Chee also addressed the different target population figures cited by government officials in the past, including the much debated 6.9 million figure in the Population White Paper, asking if the PAP would consider the SDP's proposal to base the optimal population on the happiness of residents, and a point system when bringing in foreigners for skilled jobs.

At a rally at UOB Plaza, Chee spoke about income inequality and said that the SDP was "not against wealth, but wealth inequality as the widening income gap harms the common good, erodes cohesiveness and corrodes the values that fosters social cohesiveness." Chee also called for checks on the Government and raised what he described as "failed or questionable decisions" by sovereign wealth fund GIC and investment company Temasek Holdings, implying that the money would have been better used on healthcare as "our hospitals face repeated shortage of beds and have to put patients along hospital corridors and makeshift tents." Chee also explained his decision to stand in Holland-Bukit Timah GRC, which includes wealthy private housing estates, saying that "the wealthy segment of our society cares - and cares deeply - about what is happening around them. I believe that compassion is innate in all of us."

Local media reported the popularity Chee had garnered during the election, stating that Chee's "more moderate image" and "articulate speeches proved to be a big draw," adding that "If the buzz on social media and the queues of people that have formed after the Singapore Democratic Party's (SDP) rallies to have their books signed are any indication, there is considerable interest in SDP chief Chee Soon Juan this General Election." Observers attributed Chee's improved public image to a greater level of transparency and accessibility to information than in the past, as a result of technology like social media.

Despite expectations of a close result, Chee was unsuccessful with his team winning 33.38% of the votes, losing to the incumbent PAP team. Despite his participation, the SDP fared worse in the Holland-Bukit Timah GRC than in the 2011 election. Chee described the result in as "hugely disappointing", but also noted the swing against the Opposition in every other constituency. Chee also raised the possibility of his party "working closer together" with the Workers' Party at the next general election.

==== Contesting in Bukit Batok SMC ====
In 2016, after David Ong, MP for Bukit Batok SMC, resigned from PAP citing "personal reasons", and having admitted on committing a "personal indiscretion", a by-election was called to replace the empty seat. SDP had decided on 20 March that Chee, their party secretary-general, would run as their candidate. On 27 April, Chee pledged that if elected, he would be a "full-time MP"; making the comparison: "... every morning when Mr Murali wakes up, his first destination will be his office. When I wake up every morning, my first destination is Bukit Batok." Chee lost the by-election, garnering 38.77% against PAP's Murali Pillai 61.23% of the votes. Despite the loss, Chee improved SDP's vote count by 12%.

In the 2020 Singaporean general election, Chee continued to contest at Bukit Batok SMC. During the English-language debate, Chee and PAP representative Vivian Balakrishnan sparred over the issue of a projected 10 million population in Singapore, citing a 2019 article from The Straits Times. PAP candidate and Deputy Prime Minister Heng Swee Keat later denied saying that Singapore should plan to increase its population to 10 million people. SDP later claimed victory for pressuring the PAP into declaring that it did not have a population target of 10 million, to which a PAP spokesman denounced as a "falsehood" which "renders the campaign pointless, and calls into question the integrity of the whole party". The National Population and Talent Division of the Prime Minister's Office also objected to the claim. Chee managed to garner 45.2% of the total votes cast, his best electoral result, an increase of 6.4% of votes compared to the 2016 Bukit Batok by-election results.

In February 2025, Chee announced that he would still be contesting in Bukit Batok SMC. Due to Bukit Batok SMC merging into Jurong East–Bukit Batok GRC after electoral boundary changes in March, Chee moved his candidacy to the newly formed Sembawang West SMC.

==== Contesting in Sembawang West SMC ====
In the 2025 general election, Chee contested in Sembawang West SMC against incumbent PAP MP Poh Li San. Chee lost the contest with 46.82% of the votes. Chee would later miss out on becoming a non-constituency MP (NCMP) after Andre Low, Workers' Party (WP) candidate for Jalan Kayu SMC, and the WP team for Tampines GRC, outperformed him, respectively garnering 48.53% and 47.37% of the vote against victorious PAP candidates.

== Democracy protests and outcomes ==
=== Early protests and legal issues ===
On 15 February 2002, Chee made a public speech concerning the ban of Muslim headscarfs in schools at the Speakers' Corner. For this, he was fined $3,000 because even though he was registered to speak at the Speakers' Corner, he did not have an additional police permit required for almost all public events, including concerts and political rallies.

On 1 May 2002, Chee staged a rally in front of The Istana, the official residence and office of the President of Singapore, even though his application to the police for a licence to hold the assembly had been denied. Chee was later charged for trespassing and for attempting to hold a rally without a police permit, for which he was sentenced to five weeks in jail.

=== Subsequent contempt of court charges ===
On 24 February 2006, Chan Sek Keong, the Attorney-General, filed contempt of court charges against Chee for refusing to answer the court's questions and scandalising the Singapore judiciary during the bankruptcy petition hearing on 10 February 2006. As a result, Chee was sentenced to one day in jail and a fine of $6,000, but he failed to pay the fine and was thus jailed for an additional seven days. He was released on 24 March 2006.

=== Public speaking charges ===
On 20 June 2006, Chee was charged in court for eight counts of speaking in public without a licence between 13 November 2005 and 22 April 2006, in violation of the Public Entertainments and Meeting Act. Two other SDP members were also charged.

=== Rally before IMF and World Bank meetings ===
On 22 August 2006, Chee announced that he was planning to hold protests in Singapore during 61st Annual Meetings of the Boards of Governors of the International Monetary Fund (IMF) and World Bank in September 2006 (as part of Singapore 2006) to protest against the rising income gap and raise awareness of the hardships of working-class people in Singapore. His application for a police permit for the protest was rejected on 30 August. Chee used the SDP website to continue urging people to participate in the protest.

On 9 September, Chee distributed leaflets for an upcoming "Empower Singaporeans Rally and March" when he was stopped by the police. The police warned the public that anyone participating in Chee's planned rally and march would be committing an offence under the Public Order Act. On 13 September, Chee invited both World Bank President Paul Wolfowitz and IMF managing director Rodrigo Rato to his planned rally.

At a press conference the next day, Chee announced that his application to be a civil society representative to Singapore 2006 as a representative of the Open Singapore Centre was rejected by the IMF and World Bank. An application by his sister, Chee Siok Chin, to represent the "Alliance for Reform and Democracy in Asia" was approved by the IMF and World Bank but was rejected by the Singapore government. On 15 September, Chee released a podcast that warned Prime Minister Lee Hsien Loong that the Singapore 2006 event was a "public relations disaster" for Singapore.

On 16 September, Chee started off the "Empower Singaporeans Rally and March" at 11am at the Speakers' Corner in Hong Lim Park, but was stopped by the police who formed a human barricade around him. He then announced that there would be a rally the following day in front of Parliament House but the police refused to let him leave the park until he called off the protest, so he remained in the park with his supporters.

On 17 September, Chee announced his plan to continue his protest by remaining in Hong Lim Park until the start of the IMF and World Bank meetings, which were two days away. The following day, after hours of negotiations with police, Chee went to Raffles City to hand out pamphlets to the public and then returned to the park. He stopped the protest at noon on 19 September and proclaimed that the protest had achieved its purpose. He further announced that the 72-hour protest was just a start, and that over the next few months he intended to recruit and train more activists for a campaign to bring pressure on the Singapore government to reform.

=== Additional legal challenges ===
Despite a rule in Singapore that bans podcasting during elections, Chee released a political podcast on 23 April 2006. However, on the order of the Elections Department, it was taken down by 25 April 2006.

Another defamation lawsuit was brought against Chee following an article published in the SDP's party newspaper, The New Democrat, which questioned the role of the Singapore government in the 2005 National Kidney Foundation scandal. Chee was ordered to pay damages to Prime Minister Lee Hsien Loong and former Prime Minister Lee Kuan Yew as a result of this. Chee was fined $5,000. On 23 November 2006, he was jailed for five weeks for failing to pay the fine. Two other SDP members, Gandhi Ambalam and Yap Keng Ho, were also imprisoned.

While in prison in November 2006, Chee reportedly became ill, leading to speculation from the SDP that he had been poisoned. A statement released by the SDP noted that Chee was feeling nauseous and dizzy, and was unable to sleep. Four days later, the Ministry for Home Affairs (MHA) asserted that Chee was treated the "same as other prisoners", and that the SDP's claims were "baseless, malicious and seek to undermine the reputation of the Singapore Prison Service". On 3 December 2006, after the doctor at the Queenstown Remand Prison had found traces of blood in Chee's urine, he was admitted under guard to Changi General Hospital. On 10 December, about a dozen of Chee's supporters, including members of his family, held a protest march starting at the Speakers' Corner and ending at Queenstown Remand Prison, where Chee was incarcerated. Several foreign non-government organisations released statements expressing concerns about Chee's health and treatment in prison.

Chee was released on 16 December 2006, two weeks short of his full sentence as a result of good behaviour in jail. Two days later, he published a statement on what happened during his stint in prison. He claimed that his food tray was marked, and that the light in his cell had remained on during the night, causing sleep deprivation. Two days later, the MHA replied to this, claiming "Chee's insinuations about being the victim of a food conspiracy are ridiculous and a product of his own mischief...", and that "Chee's purported 'ailment' in prison served only to provide an expedient story for his associates and foreign supporters to faithfully distort and exploit for political mileage". Chee immediately released another statement rebutting this, claiming "the MHA's statement is riddled with inconsistencies, contradictions and outright lies".

On 8 January 2007, a hearing began for charges that Chee had attempted to leave the country without a permit despite being a bankrupt.

=== Tak Boleh Tahan protest ===
On 15 March 2008, Chee and 18 others held a demonstration at Parliament House, all wearing red Tak Boleh Tahan (Cannot Take It) T-shirts to kick-start the campaign. At Parliament House, the protesters were warned by police to stop their unlawful assembly. When the warning was ignored, the police dispersed the protest and arrested 12 demonstrators, including Chee.

The trial PP vs. Chee Soon Juan and 18 others began on 24 October, with the defendants charged on two counts of violating Section 5(4)b Chapter 184 of the Miscellaneous Offences (Public and Nuisance) Act. In their defense, the "defendants claim that they're innocent by virtue of their right under the Singapore constitution to enjoy the guarantees of freedom of assembly and expression", and the trial has been described by The Washington Times as "a test about whether Singapore's judiciary is independent".

In October 2010, Chee and the other defendants were found guilty and were fined between S$900 and S$1,000.

== International activities ==
Chee is the chairman of the Asian Alliance for Reforms and Democracy, and has been engaged by the National Endowment for Democracy (NED), a U.S. agency.

Chee's party has been granted observer status to Liberal International, a world federation of liberal political parties. "SDP has signed an agreement with the Commonwealth countries, where Singapore is a party, to include respect for fundamental human rights and civil liberties," said Chee, who had also hired Amsterdam & Peroff to take up his case against the government, whose members have filed lawsuits against news publications that have run Chee's critical comments.

Chee has since served as a research fellow at the Monash Asia Institute (1997), the University of Chicago (2001), the Reagan-Fascell Democracy Program at the National Endowment for Democracy (2004), and as a visiting fellow at the University of Sydney (2014).

In an op-ed, Chee stated that "free trade agreements cannot continue to ignore human rights."

== Awards ==
- Fellowship, Monash Asia Institute, Australia (1997)
- Fellowship, University of Chicago (2001)
- Hellman/Hammett Writers Grant (2003), Human Rights Watch
- Fellowship, Reagan-Fascell Democracy Program, National Endowment for Democracy, Washington, DC (2004)
- Defender of Democracy (2003), Parliamentarians for Global Action
- Prize For Freedom (2011), Liberal International
- Fellowship, Sydney Democracy Network at the University of Sydney (2014)
- Chairman, Asian Alliance for Reforms and Democracy (current)

== Personal life ==
In 1992 Chee married Huang Chih-mei (黄智美), a psychologist from Taiwan who emigrated to Singapore. The couple have two daughters and one son, Chee An Lyn, Chee E Lyn, and Chee Shaw Hur. They live in a three-room public housing apartment in Toa Payoh. Chee's younger sister, Chee Siok Chin, is also a member of the Singapore Democratic Party.

Chee's mother died on the morning of 21 August 2020. On 25 June 2021, Chee and Huang's cafe Orange & Teal was officially opened at Rochester Mall in Buona Vista. One year later on 20 August 2022, their second cafe was opened at Marina Square. However, their second cafe was closed on 11 October 2024 due to rising costs. Their first and last cafe at Rochester Mall was also closed on 11 November 2025 and held its cash and carry sales from 11 to 13 November, which would later extended to include books giveaways from 14 to 16 November.

== Documentary ==
In 2004, Martyn See directed a documentary on Chee called Singapore Rebel. It was supposed to be screened at the Singapore International Film Festival, but was withdrawn from the festival and later banned by the Singapore government because of its political content. Singapore's Films Act forbids the production and distribution of "party political" films, which are defined as films "made by any person and directed towards any political ends in Singapore". This ban was temporary however, and was ultimately lifted on 11 September 2009.

== Opinions and commentary ==
=== Response to K Shanmugam's property sale ===
In 2024, Chee published an article addressing the significant sale of Minister K. Shanmugam's Good Class Bungalow (GCB) for $88 million. The piece critiqued the lack of transparency surrounding the transaction and called for accountability from government officials. Chee raised questions regarding the implications of such dealings in Singapore's housing market and the broader context of governance.

=== Prioritising citizens' welfare ===
In 2024, Chee argued for prioritising citizens' welfare over corporate profits. He critiqued the attempted sale of Income Insurance to Allianz and highlighted the stark disparities between ministerial salaries and the struggles of many Singaporeans. Through personal reflections, Chee called for a compassionate and equitable society, urging citizens to advocate for governance that truly served their needs.

== Bibliography ==
=== Works ===
- Chee, Soon Juan (1994). Dare to change : an alternative vision for Singapore. [Singapore]: Singapore Democratic Party. ISBN 981-00-5662-1. OCLC 31882589.
- Huang, Chih Mei (1995). Effective parenting for the Asian family. Soon Juan Chee. Singapore: Heinemann Asia. ISBN 9971-64-425-8. OCLC 226194910.
- Chee, Soon Juan (1995). Singapore My Home Too. Chee Soon Juan. ISBN 978-981-00-6788-5.
- To Be Free: Stories from Asia's Struggle Against Oppression (Monash Asia Institute: 1998) Out of Print
- Your Future, My Faith, Our Freedom: A Democratic Blueprint for Singapore (Singapore Open Centre: 2001) Out of Print
- The Power of Courage: Effecting Political Change in Singapore Through Nonviolence (2005)
- Chee, Soon Juan (2008). A nation cheated. Singapore: Chee Soon Juan. ISBN 978-981-08-0819-8.
- Democratically Speaking (2012)
- Chee, Soon Juan (2019). Never on Bended Knees. Singapore. ISBN 978-981-11-9962-2. OCLC 1088668568.
- Chee, Soon Juan (2025). Unbroken: The Power of Resilience. Singapore. ISBN 978-981-94-3999-7.

=== Biographies ===
- Go, Jaslyn, ed. (2013). Teacher, thinker, rebel, why : portraits of Chee Soon Juan. Singapore. ISBN 978-981-09-4624-1. OCLC 910239553.
