= Fok Tai Loy =

Singaporean politician (1933–1984)

- 霍泰来
- Fok Tai Loy c. 1984

1st Chairman of the Singapore Democratic Party
- In office 8 September 1980 – 28 June 1984
- Preceded by: Position established
- Succeeded by: Soon Kia Seng

Personal details
- Born: March 1933 Singapore, Straits Settlements
- Died: 28 June 1984 (aged 51) Singapore
- Party: Singapore Democratic Party (1980–1984)
- Occupation: Part-time lecturer, engineer, politician

Fok Tai Loy (Chinese: 霍泰来; March 1933 – 28 June 1984) was a Singaporean politician, engineer and part-time lecturer who served as the chairman of the Singapore Democratic Party (SDP) between 1980 and 1984.

== Early life and education ==
Fok was born in March 1933 and studied at the Saint Andrew's Secondary School. He received the Colombo Plan scholarship and he left for Australia to study at the University of Melbourne in February 1954. He graduated from the university with a Bachelor of Engineering degree.

== Career ==
After university, Fok began working at the Public Utilies Board, where he remained for 11 years. From 1961 to 1967, he served as a part-time lecturer at the Singapore Polytechnic. In October 1969, Fok was elected the president of the Employees' Co-operative Thrift and Loan Society of the City Council of Singapore. From 1969 to 1974, he served as the captain of the First Company of the Boys' Brigade in Singapore. In December 1970, he was elected to the executive council of the Boys' Brigade for the year of 1971. He was elected the organisation's vice president in 1972. He then served as the president Boys' Brigade from 1976 to 1978.

Fok also served as the president of the St. Andrew's School Parent-Teacher Association. He was also elected to the committee of the St. Andrew's Old Boys' Association.

=== Political career ===
In August 1980, it was announced that Chiam See Tong was to found a new political party, to be known as the Singapore Democratic Party (SDP), with Chiam serving as the pro tem secretary-general and Fok, then a consulting engineer, serving as the pro tem chairman. The objectives of the party included the "elimination of colonialism and feudalism, the safeguarding of parliamentary democracy and upholding the principles of democracy, socialism and the Constitution." Fok opined that Singaporeans had been "indoctrinated" by the incumbent People's Action Party (PAP) for the past decade such that "only men with university degrees" could run for parliament. It was announced that Fok would be one of three party members contesting in the upcoming 1980 Singaporean general election, along with Chiam and Earnest Chew Tian Earn. However, Chew withdrew from the election in October on account of ill health. Fok stated later that month that the party would stand for "progress towards democracy and socialism" and that it would "go against the government where it erred and agree where it thinks the ruling party is right." It was announced in December that Fok was to contest the Cairnhill Constituency seat against Wong Kwei Cheong of the PAP. He lost the election, receiving only 28.21% of the total valid votes.

Fok was officially sworn in as the chairman of the executive committee of the SDP in September 1981. In October, he announced that the party would be contesting in the upcoming 1981 Anson by-election. However, the party withdrew on nomination day, as there were already three parties contesting, deciding to "leave the fight" to J.B. Jeyaretnam of the Workers' Party (WP) instead. Fok was among the opposition leaders who attended a WP rally for the by-election in on 22 October, though Chiam was "notably absent". Fok was again elected the chairman of the SDP in November 1983. He reportedly planned to contest in the upcoming 1984 Singaporean general election.

== Personal life and death ==
Fok was married with two children. He died of cancer on 28 June 1984, having been suffering from the disease for five years.
