= Cheo Chai Chen =

Singaporean politician (1951–2024)

- 蒋才正
- Cheo in 2015

Member of Parliament for Nee Soon Central SMC
- In office 31 August 1991 – 16 December 1996
- Preceded by: Ng Pock Too
- Succeeded by: Ong Ah Heng

Personal details
- Born: Cheo Chai Chen; 1951 Colony of Singapore
- Died: 4 June 2024 (aged 73) Singapore
- Party: Singapore Democratic Party (1991–2006); National Solidarity Party (2006–2024)

Cheo Chai Chen (Note: Chinese: 蒋才正; Pe̍h-ōe-jī: Chióⁿ Châi-chèng; pinyin: Jiǎng Cáizhèng) (1951 – 4 June 2024) was a Singaporean politician and businessman. A member of the opposition Singapore Democratic Party (SDP), he served as the Member of Parliament (MP) for Nee Soon Central Single Member Constituency (SMC) between 1991 and 1996.

During the 1988 general election, Cheo made his political debut in Nee Soon Central SMC; he was defeated by the governing People's Action Party (PAP) candidate, winning 38.46% of the vote. However, in the 1991 general election, he gained the constituency, where he would be defeated during his reelection bid in 1997, with 50.33% of the vote in an upset.

Later in life, Cheo became a member and candidate of the National Solidarity Party (NSP); he never returned to Parliament. He died of oesophageal cancer in 2024.

== Early life and education ==
Cheo was born in Singapore in 1951. He graduated from Nanyang University, where he studied in the Department of Government and Public Administration.

== Political career ==
Cheo first stood for Parliament in Nee Soon Central SMC at the 1988 general election, obtaining 38.46% of the vote in a three-way contest. Ng Pock Too, the PAP candidate, won with 57.61% of the vote.

At the 1991 general election, Cheo rematched against Ng in a two-way contest, winning the constituency with 50.33% of the vote, or 168 votes, in an upset victory that led to a recount. He was one of three SDP MPs to be elected at the general election – party leader Chiam See Tong retained his seat in Potong Pasir SMC, while Ling How Doong gained Bukit Gombak SMC. Low Thia Khiang, the leader of the Workers' Party (WP), was also elected in Hougang SMC, giving the opposition a total of four elected seats. No non-constituency MP (NCMP) seats were offered after the election as the four elected opposition MPs exceeded the minimum number of opposition MPs (three as of the election) legally required in Parliament under the NCMP scheme. (Note: An NCMP is an opposition candidate in Singapore who, by virtue of being among the best-performing defeated opposition candidates, is appointed ("elected" in the language of Singaporean law) to Parliament despite their defeat. A minimum number of opposition MPs is set; the number of NCMP seats to be offered after every election is the difference between said minimum and the number of elected opposition MPs after a general election. No NCMP seats will be offered if the difference is zero or negative. As the name implies, an NCMP does not represent any constituency.) The results were seen as a significant success for the opposition; at the previous election, Chiam had been the only elected opposition MP.

In 1994, Chiam resigned as the leader of the SDP after a dispute with the rest of the party's Central Executive Committee (CEC), which included Cheo. After being publicly criticised by Chiam, the CEC attempted to expel him from the party, which would have forced him to vacate his parliamentary seat under Singaporean law; however, he won a court case to prevent them from doing so on procedural grounds.

Negative publicity surrounding the dispute with Chiam hurt the SDP's prospects during the 1997 general election. Cheo, seeking reelection, was defeated by PAP candidate Ong Ah Heng, obtaining 38.67% of the vote. Ling was also defeated in Bukit Gombak. Chiam joined the Singapore People's Party (SPP) after Parliament was dissolved ahead of the election, and was re-elected under its banner as the MP for Potong Pasir SMC. The SDP was thus left with no seats in Parliament.

At the 2001 general election, Cheo stood as a member of the SDP's team in the Hong Kah Group Representation Constituency (GRC). The PAP's team won the contest with 79.7% of the votes to the SDP team's 20.3%.

In 2006, Cheo joined the NSP. At the 2006 general election (in which the NSP's candidates stood under the banner of the Singapore Democratic Alliance), Cheo was a candidate in the Jalan Besar GRC. The PAP's team won the contest with 69.3% of the votes to 30.7%.

At the 2011 general election, Cheo led the NSP team for Marine Parade GRC. The PAP's team (which was led by Senior Minister Goh Chok Tong) defeated the NSP's team by 56.6% of the votes to 43.4%.

At the 2015 general election, NSP initially planned to field a candidate against PAP in the MacPherson SMC but decided to pull out of the contest when WP announced it had planned to contest in the constituency also. NSP later changed its mind and fielded Steve Chia in the constituency. Chia would later pull out of the contest citing internet abuse over his participation. As a result, NSP fielded Cheo for the contest. NSP's Acting Secretary-General, Hazel Poa, resigned from the party, stating that she disagreed with the decision of the party's Central Executive Committee to contest in MacPherson.

During the election campaign, Cheo drew considerable criticism for telling reporters that Tin Pei Ling's status as a new mother was "her weakness" and saying that she might spend more time focusing on her child than on her constituents. Cheo later claimed that this comment was meant as a joke. In the end, Cheo took just 0.8% of the votes in the constituency, compared to Chen's 33.6% and Tin's 65.6%, thus forfeiting his $14,500 election deposit.

== Personal life ==
Cheo died of oesophageal cancer on 4 June 2024, at the age of 73.

== See also ==
- List of Singapore opposition party MPs elected
