= Marine Parade Group Representation Constituency =

Former constituency in Singapore

Marine Parade
- Former group representation constituency for the Parliament of Singapore
- Region: Central, North-East and East Regions, Singapore
- Electorate: 139,738

Former constituency
- Created: 1988; 38 years ago
- Abolished: 2025; 1 year ago
- Seats: 5
- Member: Constituency abolished
- Town Council: Marine Parade
- Created from: Joo Chiat Constituency; Geylang Serai Constituency; Marine Parade Constituency
- Replaced by: East Coast GRC (Chai Chee, Joo Chiat division); Marine Parade–Braddell Heights GRC (all other areas)

The Marine Parade Group Representation Constituency was a five-member group representation constituency (GRC) in central, eastern and north-eastern Singapore. It covered sections of the planning areas of Bedok, Geylang, Kallang, Marine Parade, Serangoon and Hougang. At abolition, it had five divisions: Marine Parade, Geylang Serai, Braddell Heights, Joo Chiat and Kembangan–Chai Chee, managed by Marine Parade Town Council.

== History ==
=== Creation and SJP straight fights (1988/1991) ===
Prior to the 1988 general election, Marine Parade GRC was formed with three seats in Parliament; led by Deputy Prime Minister Goh Chok Tong, the governing People's Action Party (PAP) defeated the Singapore Justice Party (SJP) with 73.81% of the vote. Helmed again by Goh, who was now the Prime Minister, the PAP won reelection in 1991 with an increased 77.25% of the vote against the SJP; as with all GRCs at that election, Marine Parade GRC was assigned four seats.

=== 1992 by-election ===
In 1992, a by-election was held in Marine Parade GRC after all four incumbent Members of Parliament (MPs) resigned, ostensibly to allow J. B. Jeyaretnam, the leader of the Workers' Party (WP), to contest in an election; he had previously been disqualified from the 1991 general election. Prior to the by-election, incumbent Lim Chee Onn retired "to enable [himself] to concentrate on [his] corporate responsibilities"; in response, Goh said that the retirement allowed him to field a candidate with "ministerial potential". After the WP left the nomination centre without filing nomination papers, the PAP won 72.94% of the vote against the Singapore Democratic Party (SDP), the National Solidarity Party (NSP), and the SJP; it would be the last contest in the GRC until the 2011 general election.

=== NSP straight fight (2011) ===
In the 2011 general election, the PAP team for Marine Parade GRC, still led by now-Senior Minister Goh, defeated Cheo Chai Chen and his NSP team with 56.64% of the vote, a significant decrease from the 72.94% garnered in 1992. It was the second-narrowest PAP victory in a GRC that year after that in East Coast GRC.

=== WP contests (2015/2020) ===
In the 2015 general election, the WP started to contest Marine Parade GRC, fielding a team led by sitting non-constituency MP (NCMP) Yee Jenn Jong. Joo Chiat Single Member Constituency (SMC), which he had unsuccessfully contested in 2011, was absorbed into the GRC, while the MacPherson division became an SMC. Edwin Tong, the incumbent MP for the Jalan Besar division of Moulmein–Kallang GRC, joined the PAP team for Marine Parade GRC after his GRC was dissolved. Now led by anchor minister (Note: A full Cabinet minister leading the PAP team in a GRC.) Tan Chuan-Jin, the PAP team defeated the WP with 64.07% of the vote.

Prior to the 2020 general election, the Joo Seng area of the GRC was transferred to Potong Pasir SMC; Goh and Fatimah Lateef retired from politics and were replaced by Tan See Leng and Fahmi Aliman respectively. Again led by Tan Chuan-Jin, now the Speaker of Parliament, the PAP team retained the GRC against the WP with 57.74% of the vote.

==== Resignation of Tan Chuan-Jin ====
On 17 July 2023, Tan Chuan-Jin, alongside Cheng Li Hui, then-MP for the Tampines East division of Tampines GRC, resigned from Parliament and the PAP after having an affair. Tong took over his responsibilities as MP for the Kembangan–Chai Chee division.

=== Dissolution (2025) ===
Prior to the 2025 general election, Marine Parade GRC was abolished. The HDB estate (Note: An estate comprising public apartments, or flats, built by the Housing and Development Board (HDB).) of Chai Chee, as well as the entire Joo Chiat division, were transferred to East Coast GRC. The remainder of Marine Parade GRC was merged with certain polling districts in Mountbatten and Potong Pasir SMCs, as well as the entire MacPherson SMC, to become Marine Parade–Braddell Heights GRC.

== Members of Parliament ==
Election	Division	Members of Parliament	Party
Formation
1988	Joo Chiat; Geylang Serai; Marine Parade	Choo Wee Khiang; Othman Haron Eusofe; Goh Chok Tong	PAP
1991	Joo Chiat; Geylang Serai; Marine Parade; MacPherson	Lim Chee Onn; Othman Haron Eusofe; Goh Chok Tong; Matthias Yao	PAP
1992	Joo Chiat; Geylang Serai; Marine Parade; MacPherson	Teo Chee Hean; Othman Haron Eusofe; Goh Chok Tong; Matthias Yao	PAP
1997	Braddell Heights; Geylang Serai; Kampong Ubi; Marine Parade; Mountbatten; Serangoon	Goh Choon Kang; Othman Haron Eusofe; Mohamad Maidin bin Packer Mohd; Goh Chok Tong; Yap Giau Cheng Eugene; Lim Hwee Hua	PAP
2001	Braddell Heights; Geylang Serai; Kampong Ubi; Marine Parade; Mountbatten; Serangoon	R Ravindran; Othman Haron Eusofe; Mohamad Maidin bin Packer Mohd; Goh Chok Tong; Andy Gan Lai Chiang; Lim Hwee Hua	PAP
2006	Braddell Heights; Geylang Serai; Kaki Bukit; Kampong Ubi–Kembangan; Marine Parade; Mountbatten	Seah Kian Peng; Fatimah Lateef; Muhammad Faishal Ibrahim; Ong Seh Hong; Goh Chok Tong; Lim Biow Chuan	PAP
2011	Braddell Heights; Geylang Serai; Kembangan–Chai Chee; MacPherson; Marine Parade	Seah Kian Peng; Fatimah Lateef; Tan Chuan-Jin; Tin Pei Ling; Goh Chok Tong	PAP
2015	Braddell Heights; Geylang Serai; Joo Chiat; Kembangan–Chai Chee; Marine Parade	Seah Kian Peng; Fatimah Lateef; Edwin Tong; Tan Chuan-Jin; Goh Chok Tong	PAP
2020	Braddell Heights; Geylang Serai; Joo Chiat; Kembangan–Chai Chee; Marine Parade	Seah Kian Peng; Fahmi Aliman; Edwin Tong; Tan Chuan-Jin (Note: Resigned on 17 July 2023 after having an affair with Cheng Li Hui.) (2020–2023); Tan See Leng	PAP
Constituency abolished (2025)

== Electoral results ==
Note: The Elections Department does not include rejected votes when calculating the vote shares of candidates. Hence, all candidates' vote shares will total to 100% at any given election (may not appear so in multi-way contests due to rounding).

=== Elections in 1980s ===
General Election 1988
Party	Candidate	Votes	%
PAP	Choo Wee Khiang Othman Haron Eusofe Goh Chok Tong	41,325	73.81
SJP	A R Suib M Ramasamy Theng Chin Eng	14,660	26.19
Majority		26,665	47.62
Total valid votes		55,985	
Rejected ballots			
Turnout			
Registered electors		62,385	
PAP win (new seat)			

=== Elections in 1990s ===
General Election 1991: Marine Parade GRC
Party	Candidate	Votes	%	±%
PAP	Goh Chok Tong Lim Chee Onn Matthias Yao Othman Haron Eusofe	51,685	77.25%	▲3.44%
SJP	Aminuddin Bin Ami Rajasekaran K S M Suib Bin Abdul Rahman Theng Chin Eng	15,222	22.75%	▼3.44%
Turnout		66,907	90.38%	▲1.28%
PAP hold		Swing	▲3.44	

By-Election 1992: Marine Parade GRC
Party	Candidate	Votes	%	±%
PAP	Goh Chok Tong Matthias Yao Othman Haron Eusofe Teo Chee Hean	48,965	72.94%	▼4.31%
SDP	Ashleigh Seow Chuan-Hock Chee Soon Juan Low Yong Nguan Md Shariff bin Yahya	16,447	24.50%	N/A
NSP	Ken Sunn Sarry bin Hassan Tan Chee Kien Yong Choon Poh	950	1.42%	N/A
SJP	A R Suib Lim Teong Howe Theng Chin Eng Yen Kim Khooi	764	1.14%	▼21.61%
Turnout		67,126	90.72%	▲0.34%
PAP hold		Swing	▼4.31%	

General Election 1997: Marine Parade GRC
Party	Candidate	Votes	%	±%
PAP	Goh Choon Kang Goh Chok Tong Lim Hwee Hua Mohammed Maidin bin Packer Mohd Othaman Haron Eusofe Yap Giau Cheng Eugene	Unopposed		
Turnout		Walkover		
PAP hold		Swing		

=== Elections in 2000s ===
General Election 2001: Marine Parade GRC
Party	Candidate	Votes	%	±%
PAP	Andy Gan Lai Chiang Goh Chok Tong Lim Hwee Hua Mohammed Maidin bin Packer Mohd Othaman Haron Eusofe R Ravindran	Unopposed		
Turnout		Walkover		
PAP hold		Swing		

General Election 2006: Marine Parade GRC
Party	Candidate	Votes	%	±%
PAP	Fatimah Lateef Goh Chok Tong Lim Biow Chuan Muhammad Faishal Ibrahim Ong Seh Hong Seah Kian Peng	Unopposed		
Turnout		Walkover		
PAP hold		Swing		

=== Elections in 2010s ===
General Election 2011
Party	Candidate	Votes	%	±%
PAP	Fatimah Lateef Goh Chok Tong Tan Chuan-Jin Tin Pei Ling Seah Kian Peng	78,286	56.65	N/A
NSP	Abdul Salim Harun Cheo Chai Chen Ivan Yeo Nicole Seah Spencer Ng	59,926	43.35	N/A
Majority		18,360	13.30	
Total valid votes		138,212		
Rejected ballots				
Turnout				
Registered electors		154,451		
PAP hold		Swing	▼16.29	

General Election 2015
Party	Candidate	Votes	%	±%
PAP	Edwin Tong Fatimah Lateef Goh Chok Tong Seah Kian Peng Tan Chuan-Jin	85,138	64.07	▲7.42
WP	Yee Jenn Jong Dylan Ng Firuz Khan He Ting Ru Terence Tan	47,753	35.93	N/A
Majority		37,385	28.14	
Total valid votes		132,891	98.75	
Rejected ballots		1,682	1.25	
Turnout		134,573	92.02	
Registered electors		146,244		
PAP hold		Swing	▲7.42	

=== Elections in 2020s ===
General Election 2020
Party	Candidate	Votes	%	±%
PAP	Edwin Tong Fahmi Aliman Seah Kian Peng Tan Chuan-Jin Tan See Leng	75,203	57.74	▼6.33
WP	Fadli Fawzi Muhammad Azhar Bin Abdul Latip Nathaniel Koh Ron Tan Yee Jenn Jong	55,047	42.26	▲6.33
Majority		20,156	15.48	
Total valid votes		130,250	98.65	
Rejected ballots		1,789	1.35	
Turnout		132,039	94.57	▲1.87
Registered electors		139,622		
PAP hold		Swing	▼6.33	
