= 15th Parliament of Singapore =

Parliament of Singapore since 2025

- Majority parliament
- 5 September 2025 – present

House
- Seating arrangements of the House
- Speaker of Parliament: Seah Kian Peng 5 September 2025 –
- Prime Minister: Lawrence Wong 5 September 2025 –
- Leader of the Opposition: Pritam Singh 5 September 2025 – 15 January 2026 (de jure) (Note: Pritam Singh was a de jure Opposition Leader until 15 January 2026, after which he was demoted to de facto after the date, though he remain as the Leader of the Opposition as he was the WP Secretary-General since 8 April 2018.)

Session(s)

1st Session
- 5 September 2025 –

Cabinet(s)

19th Cabinet
- Lawrence Wong; 23 May 2025 –

Parliamentarians
Elected	NCMP	Nominated
96 (Note: 97 MPs were elected in the 2025 Singaporean general election. There is currently one vacant seat.)	2	9
<14th	16th>

The 15th Parliament of Singapore is the current meeting of the Parliament of Singapore. It was opened by President Tharman Shanmugaratnam on 5 September 2025. The 97 elected members of this parliament were elected in the 2025 general election. As was the case in the previous parliament, this parliament is controlled by the majority of the governing People's Action Party (PAP), which is led by Prime Minister Lawrence Wong. There are 108 seats in this parliament, including 2 non-constituency MPs (NCMPs) and 9 nominated MPs (NMPs). One seat fell vacant on 20 July 2026 following the resignation of Muhammad Faishal Ibrahim, who is the MP for Marine Parade-Braddell Heights GRC.

This parliament was the first to feature only one opposition party—in this case, the Workers' Party (WP)—since the 13th Parliament elected in 2015. Pritam Singh led the party as the de jure Leader of the Opposition until 15 January 2026, where he was demoted to de facto. The WP controls 10 elected and two NCMP seats, giving it a representation of 12 seats, the largest representation for any single opposition party in post-independence Singapore and surpassing its own record of 10 seats in the previous parliament. On 20 June 2025, the Prime Minister's Office announced the renomination of incumbent speaker Seah Kian Peng for another term.

== Results of the 2025 general election ==
Popular vote
1. PAP (65.6%)
2. WP (15.0%)
3. PSP (4.88%)
4. RDU (3.96%)
5. SDP (3.72%)
6. Others (6.87%)
Elected seats won
1. 5 seats (PAP; uncontested) (5.15%)
2. 82 seats (PAP; contested) (84.5%)
3. 10 seats (WP) (10.3%)

Party	Votes	%	+/–	Seats	+/–
People's Action Party	1,570,803	65.57	+4.35	87	+4
Workers' Party	359,161	14.99	+3.77	12	+2
Progress Singapore Party	117,005	4.88	−5.30	0	–2
Red Dot United	94,955	3.96	+2.71	0	0
Singapore Democratic Party	89,053	3.72	−0.73	0	0
People's Alliance for Reform	60,207	2.51	New	0	New
Singapore Democratic Alliance	29,213	1.22	−0.27	0	0
Singapore People's Party	28,205	1.18	−0.34	0	0
Singapore United Party	15,874	0.66	New	0	New
People's Power Party	15,525	0.65	−0.35	0	0
National Solidarity Party	3,127	0.13	−3.62	0	0
Independents	12,537	0.52	+0.49	0	0
Total	2,395,665	100.00	–	99	+4
Valid votes	2,395,665	98.24			
Invalid/blank votes	42,945	1.76			
Total votes	2,438,610	100.00			
Registered voters/turnout	2,627,026	92.83			
Source: ELD (Note: 131,820 of the 2,758,846 voters were registered in the uncontested Marine Parade–Braddell Heights GRC, leaving 2,627,026 voters able to vote.)

== Officeholders ==
=== Speakers ===
- Speaker: Seah Kian Peng (Marine Parade–Braddell Heights GRC, PAP)
- Deputy Speaker:
  - Christopher de Souza (Holland–Bukit Timah GRC, PAP)
  - Xie Yao Quan (Jurong Central SMC, PAP)

=== Leaders ===
- Prime Minister: Lawrence Wong (Marsiling–Yew Tee GRC, PAP)
- Leader of the Opposition: Pritam Singh (Aljunied GRC, WP)

=== House Leaders ===
- Leader of the House: Indranee Rajah (Pasir Ris–Changi GRC, PAP)
- Deputy Leader of the House: Zaqy Mohamad (Marsiling–Yew Tee GRC, PAP)

=== Whips ===
- Government Party Whip: Janil Puthucheary (Punggol GRC, PAP)
- Deputy Government Party Whip: Sim Ann (Holland–Bukit Timah GRC, PAP)
- Opposition Party Whip: Pritam Singh (Aljunied GRC, WP)
- Deputy Opposition Party Whip: Sylvia Lim (Aljunied GRC, WP)

== Members ==
Constituency	Division	Member	Party
Aljunied GRC	Bedok Reservoir–Punggol	Gerald Giam	Workers' Party
Aljunied GRC	Eunos	Pritam Singh	Workers' Party
Aljunied GRC	Kaki Bukit	Fadli Fawzi	Workers' Party
Aljunied GRC	Paya Lebar	Sylvia Lim	Workers' Party
Aljunied GRC	Serangoon	Kenneth Tiong	Workers' Party
Ang Mo Kio GRC	Ang Mo Kio–Hougang	Darryl David	People's Action Party
Ang Mo Kio GRC	Buangkok–Fernvale South	Victor Lye	People's Action Party
Ang Mo Kio GRC	Cheng San	Nadia Ahmad Samdin	People's Action Party
Ang Mo Kio GRC	Seletar–Serangoon	Jasmin Lau	People's Action Party
Ang Mo Kio GRC	Teck Ghee	Lee Hsien Loong	People's Action Party
Bishan–Toa Payoh GRC	Bishan East–Sin Ming	Elysa Chen	People's Action Party
Bishan–Toa Payoh GRC	Toa Payoh Central	Cai Yinzhou	People's Action Party
Bishan–Toa Payoh GRC	Toa Payoh East	Saktiandi Supaat	People's Action Party
Bishan–Toa Payoh GRC	Toa Payoh West–Thomson	Chee Hong Tat	People's Action Party
Bukit Gombak SMC		Low Yen Ling	People's Action Party
Bukit Panjang SMC		Liang Eng Hwa	People's Action Party
Chua Chu Kang GRC	Brickland–Tengah	Jeffrey Siow	People's Action Party
Chua Chu Kang GRC	Chua Chu Kang	Tan See Leng	People's Action Party
Chua Chu Kang GRC	Keat Hong	Zhulkarnain Abdul Rahim	People's Action Party
Chua Chu Kang GRC	Tengah	Choo Pei Ling	People's Action Party
East Coast GRC	Bedok	Dinesh Vasu Dash	People's Action Party
East Coast GRC	Changi–Simei	Jessica Tan	People's Action Party
East Coast GRC	Fengshan	Hazlina Abdul Halim	People's Action Party
East Coast GRC	Joo Chiat	Edwin Tong	People's Action Party
East Coast GRC	Kampong Chai Chee	Tan Kiat How	People's Action Party
Holland–Bukit Timah GRC	Bukit Timah	Sim Ann	People's Action Party
Holland–Bukit Timah GRC	Cashew	Vivian Balakrishnan	People's Action Party
Holland–Bukit Timah GRC	Ulu Pandan	Christopher de Souza	People's Action Party
Holland–Bukit Timah GRC	Zhenghua	Edward Chia	People's Action Party
Hougang SMC		Dennis Tan	Workers' Party
Jalan Besar GRC	Kampong Glam	Denise Phua	People's Action Party
Jalan Besar GRC	Kolam Ayer	Wan Rizal	People's Action Party
Jalan Besar GRC	Kreta Ayer–Kim Seng	Josephine Teo	People's Action Party
Jalan Besar GRC	Whampoa	Shawn Loh	People's Action Party
Jalan Kayu SMC		Ng Chee Meng	People's Action Party
Jurong Central SMC		Xie Yao Quan	People's Action Party
Jurong East–Bukit Batok GRC	Bukit Batok	Murali Pillai	People's Action Party
Jurong East–Bukit Batok GRC	Bukit Batok East	Rahayu Mahzam	People's Action Party
Jurong East–Bukit Batok GRC	Clementi	David Hoe	People's Action Party
Jurong East–Bukit Batok GRC	Hong Kah North	Lee Hong Chuang	People's Action Party
Jurong East–Bukit Batok GRC	Yuhua	Grace Fu	People's Action Party
Kebun Baru SMC		Henry Kwek	People's Action Party
Marine Parade–Braddell Heights GRC	Braddell Heights	Seah Kian Peng	People's Action Party
Marine Parade–Braddell Heights GRC	Geylang Serai	Diana Pang	People's Action Party
Marine Parade–Braddell Heights GRC	Kembangan	Faishal Ibrahim (Note: Faishal Ibrahim resigned on 20 July 2026. The remaining MPs of Marine Parade–Braddell Heights GRC acted as interim MPs for Kembangan division.)	People's Action Party
Marine Parade–Braddell Heights GRC	MacPherson	Tin Pei Ling	People's Action Party
Marine Parade–Braddell Heights GRC	Marine Parade	Goh Pei Ming	People's Action Party
Marsiling–Yew Tee GRC	Limbang	Lawrence Wong	People's Action Party
Marsiling–Yew Tee GRC	Marsiling	Zaqy Mohamad	People's Action Party
Marsiling–Yew Tee GRC	Woodgrove	Hany Soh	People's Action Party
Marsiling–Yew Tee GRC	Yew Tee	Alex Yam	People's Action Party
Marymount SMC		Gan Siow Huang	People's Action Party
Mountbatten SMC		Gho Sze Kee	People's Action Party
Nee Soon GRC	Chong Pang	K. Shanmugam	People's Action Party
Nee Soon GRC	Nee Soon Central	Goh Hanyan	People's Action Party
Nee Soon GRC	Nee Soon East	Jackson Lam	People's Action Party
Nee Soon GRC	Nee Soon Link	Syed Harun Alhabsyi	People's Action Party
Nee Soon GRC	Nee Soon South	Lee Hui Ying	People's Action Party
Pasir Ris–Changi GRC	Changi	Valerie Lee	People's Action Party
Pasir Ris–Changi GRC	Pasir Ris Central	Desmond Tan	People's Action Party
Pasir Ris–Changi GRC	Pasir Ris East	Sharael Taha	People's Action Party
Pasir Ris–Changi GRC	Pasir Ris West	Indranee Rajah	People's Action Party
Pioneer SMC		Patrick Tay	People's Action Party
Potong Pasir SMC		Alex Yeo	People's Action Party
Punggol GRC	Punggol Coast	Janil Puthucheary	People's Action Party
Punggol GRC	Punggol North	Gan Kim Yong	People's Action Party
Punggol GRC	Punggol Shore	Yeo Wan Ling	People's Action Party
Punggol GRC	Punggol West	Sun Xueling	People's Action Party
Queenstown SMC		Eric Chua	People's Action Party
Radin Mas SMC		Melvin Yong	People's Action Party
Sembawang GRC	Admiralty	Vikram Nair	People's Action Party
Sembawang GRC	Canberra	Gabriel Lam	People's Action Party
Sembawang GRC	Naval Base	Ng Shi Xuan	People's Action Party
Sembawang GRC	Sembawang Central	Ong Ye Kung	People's Action Party
Sembawang GRC	Woodlands	Mariam Jaafar	People's Action Party
Sembawang West SMC		Poh Li San	People's Action Party
Sengkang GRC	Buangkok	He Ting Ru	Workers' Party
Sengkang GRC	Anchorvale	Jamus Lim	Workers' Party
Sengkang GRC	Compassvale	Abdul Muhaimin	Workers' Party
Sengkang GRC	Rivervale	Louis Chua	Workers' Party
Tampines GRC	Tampines Boulevard	Baey Yam Keng	People's Action Party
Tampines GRC	Tampines Central	Koh Poh Koon	People's Action Party
Tampines GRC	Tampines East	Charlene Chen	People's Action Party
Tampines GRC	Tampines North	David Neo	People's Action Party
Tampines GRC	Tampines West	Masagos Zulkifli	People's Action Party
Tampines Changkat SMC		Desmond Choo	People's Action Party
Tanjong Pagar GRC	Buona Vista	Chan Chun Sing	People's Action Party
Tanjong Pagar GRC	Henderson–Dawson	Joan Pereira	People's Action Party
Tanjong Pagar GRC	Moulmein–Cairnhill	Alvin Tan	People's Action Party
Tanjong Pagar GRC	Tanjong Pagar–Tiong Bahru	Foo Cexiang	People's Action Party
Tanjong Pagar GRC	Telok Blangah	Rachel Ong	People's Action Party
West Coast–Jurong West GRC	Ayer Rajah	Cassandra Lee	People's Action Party
West Coast–Jurong West GRC	Boon Lay–West Coast (Note: While West Coast is considered as one division for the West Coast-Jurong West GRC, the Meet-the-People Sessions for West Coast division is currently overseen by two MPs, Ayer Rajah division MP Cassandra Lee and Boon Lay division MP Desmond Lee. Either one of two MPs conduct said sessions for the West Coast division on alternating weeks. For the purpose of the MP representation, it is considered as Boon Lay-West Coast.)	Desmond Lee	People's Action Party
West Coast–Jurong West GRC	Jurong Spring–Gek Poh	Hamid Razak	People's Action Party
West Coast–Jurong West GRC	Nanyang	Ang Wei Neng	People's Action Party
West Coast–Jurong West GRC	Taman Jurong	Shawn Huang	People's Action Party
Yio Chu Kang SMC		Yip Hon Weng	People's Action Party
Non-constituency Member of Parliament		Andre Low	Workers' Party
Non-constituency Member of Parliament		Eileen Chong	Workers' Party
Nominated Member of Parliament		Azhar Othman (Note: Serving as Nominated Member of Parliament since 12 January 2026.)	Independent
Nominated Member of Parliament		Kenneth Goh	Independent
Nominated Member of Parliament		Haresh Singaraju	Independent
Nominated Member of Parliament		Terence Ho	Independent
Nominated Member of Parliament		Kuah Boon Theng	Independent
Nominated Member of Parliament		Mark Lee	Independent
Nominated Member of Parliament		Neo Kok Beng	Independent
Nominated Member of Parliament		Kenneth Poon	Independent
Nominated Member of Parliament		Sanjeev Kumar Tiwari	Independent
