= South West Community Development Council =

Coordinates: 1°19′N 103°43′E

Type
- Type: Local authority of the South West District

Leadership
- Mayor: Low Yen Ling
- General Manager: Dulcie Eng
- Seats: 17

Website
- southwest.cdc.gov.sg

South West District of Singapore

The South West Community Development Council is one of five Community Development Councils (CDCs) set up across the Republic of Singapore to aid in local administration of governmental policies and schemes. They are funded in part by the government although they are free to engage in fund-raising activities.

The South West Community Development Council (CDC) was formed on 24 November 2001. Spanning the south-western region of Singapore, covering a third of its land area. The District has about 220,000 households with over 750,000 residents. The District has a characteristically high concentration of industrial estates, including the Jurong Islands and Tuas area.

== Constituencies ==
As of May 2025, the South West district covers:

=== Single Member Constituency (SMC) ===
- Bukit Gombak SMC
- Jurong Central SMC
- Pioneer SMC

=== Group Representation Constituency (GRC) ===
- Chua Chu Kang GRC
  - Brickland (Note: Known in the Chua Chu Kang Town Council as "Brickland-Tengah".)
  - Chua Chu Kang
  - Keat Hong
  - Tengah
- Jurong East–Bukit Batok GRC
  - Bukit Batok East
  - Bukit Batok
  - Clementi
  - Hong Kah North
  - Yuhua
- West Coast-Jurong West GRC
  - Ayer Rajah
  - Boon Lay-West Coast (Note: While West Coast is considered as one division for the West Coast-Jurong West GRC, the Meet-the-People Sessions for West Coast division is currently overseen by two MPs, Ayer Rajah division MP Cassandra Lee and Boon Lay division MP Desmond Lee. Either one of two MPs conduct said sessions for the West Coast division on alternating weeks. For the purpose of the MP representation, it is considered as Boon Lay-West Coast.)
  - Nanyang
  - Jurong Spring-Gek Poh
  - Taman Jurong

== Results of CDC by election ==
The South West CDC was among its traditional strongholds for the ruling PAP due to a high contested vote share of at least 60% throughout its lifetime (peaking at 78.87% in the 2001 election) or seats being won via walkover. While in 2006 saw that CDC having the fewest seats being contested, with just one seat (and the only time the CDC polled below national average), 2015 saw the CDC polling the highest among all CDCs, at 77.39%. But in 2020, the CDC saw a steep decline in their PAP's contested vote (most notably West Coast GRC), but barely maintained a share higher than the national average, in addition of retaining every seats for the PAP.

Year	Constituencies (GRC seats in parenthesis)	Seat composition		Electorate		PAP vote share	
Year	Constituencies (GRC seats in parenthesis)	Total	Contested	Total	Contested	Total votes	Vote share
2001	Ayer Rajah, Bukit Timah, Chua Chu Kang, Hong Kah (5), Jurong (5), West Coast (5)	18 / 84	13 / 18	425,254	314,475	230,686	78.87%
2006	Chua Chu Kang, Hong Kah (5), Jurong (5), West Coast (5)	16 / 84	1 / 16	424,027	24,975	14,156	60.37%
2011	Chua Chu Kang (5), Hong Kah North, Jurong (5), Pioneer, West Coast (5), Yuhua	18 / 87	18 / 18	481,614	481,614	285,710	64.82%
2015	Bukit Batok, Chua Chu Kang (4), Hong Kah North, Jurong (5), Pioneer, West Coast (4), Yuhua	17 / 89	17 / 17	453,026	453,026	322,495	77.39%
2020	Bukit Batok, Chua Chu Kang (4), Hong Kah North, Jurong (5), Pioneer, West Coast (5), Yuhua	18 / 93	18 / 18	476,455	476,455	283,629	61.39%
2025	Bukit Gombak, Chua Chu Kang (4), Jurong Central, Jurong East-Bukit Batok (5), Pioneer, West Coast-Jurong West (5)	17 / 97	17 / 17	476,339	476,339	298,672	68.07%

== Mayors ==
The incumbent Mayor of South West District is MP for Chua Chu Kang GRC Low Yen Ling from the People's Action Party since 2014.

#	Name	Start of term	End of term	Political Party
1	Yu-Foo Yee Shoon	November 2001	August 2004	People's Action Party
2	Amy Khor	12 August 2004	26 May 2014	People's Action Party
3	Low Yen Ling	27 May 2014	Incumbent	People's Action Party
