= Xie Yao Quan =

Singaporean politician

The Honourable Xie Yao Quan
- 谢曜全
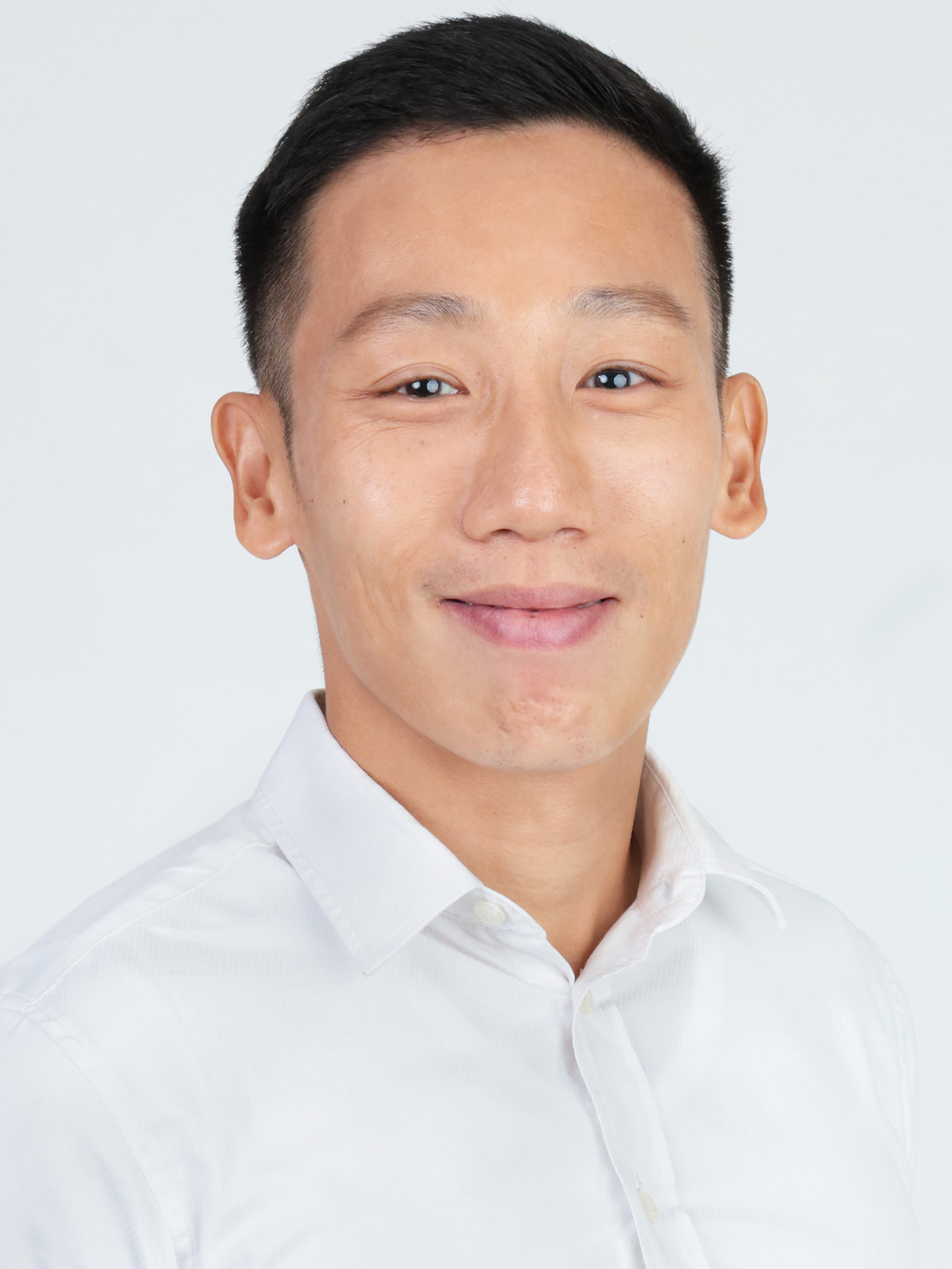
- Official portrait, 2020

Deputy Speaker of the Parliament of Singapore
- Incumbent
- Assumed office 22 September 2025 Serving with Christopher de Souza
- Prime Minister: Lawrence Wong
- Speaker: Seah Kian Peng
- Preceded by: Jessica Tan; Christopher de Souza

Member of the Singapore Parliament for Jurong Central SMC
- Incumbent
- Assumed office 3 May 2025
- Preceded by: Constituency established
- Majority: 16,634 (61.02%)

Member of the Singapore Parliament for Jurong GRC
- In office 10 July 2020 – 15 April 2025
- Preceded by: PAP held
- Succeeded by: Constituency abolished
- Majority: 60,586 (49.22%)

Personal details
- Born: 19 October 1984 (age 42) Singapore
- Party: People's Action Party
- Relations: Ong Ye Kung (maternal cousin)
- Education: Duke University (BS, MS)

Xie Yao Quan (Note: Chinese: 谢曜全; pinyin: Xiè Yàoquán) (born 19 October 1984) is a Singaporean politician who has served as Deputy Speaker of Parliament since 2025. A member of the governing People's Action Party (PAP), he has been the Member of Parliament (MP) for Jurong Central Single Member Constituency (SMC) since 2025. He had previously represented the Jurong Central division of Jurong Group Representation Constituency (GRC) between 2020 and 2025.

== Education ==
Xie was educated at Raffles Institution and Raffles Junior College. He holds a Bachelor of Science degree in biomedical engineering and a Master of Science degree in engineering management from Duke University.

He was a recipient of the Merit Scholarship (Combat) issued by the Singapore Armed Forces (SAF).

== Career ==
Xie served the SAF for six years. After leaving it, he worked at an investment company for five years.

During his first run for political office, Xie was the Head of Healthcare Redesign at Alexandra Hospital, a member of the National University Health System (NUHS). He later became the chief executive officer (CEO) of QuantEdge Foundation (Singapore).

=== Political career ===
In the 2020 general election, Xie was introduced as a prospective PAP candidate in the five-member Jurong GRC, replacing Ivan Lim, who had withdrawn after allegations by supposed former acquaintances that he was arrogant and elitist while working as, among other roles, a National Service (NS) commander. The PAP team defeated that of the opposition party Red Dot United (RDU) with 74.61% of the vote.

For the 2025 general election, Xie was nominated to run for reelection in the newly-formed Jurong Central SMC after it was created from his Jurong Central division. He defeated Kala Manickam from RDU with 80.51% of the vote. Xie has served as the Chairman of the Jurong East–Bukit Batok Town Council since 2025.

On 22 September 2025, Xie was nominated as Deputy Speaker in the 15th Parliament, alongside incumbent Christopher de Souza.

==== Volunteer work ====
As of 2020, Xie served on the Singapore Road Safety Council, the board of SG Enable, and the Merdeka Generation Communications and Engagement Taskforce. Prior to entering politics, he was also a grassroots leader, helping to start a football and study programme for students, a community initiative focusing on seniors and persons with disabilities, as well as a community gardening movement. He was also the vice-chairperson of the Jurong Spring Citizens' Consultative Committee.

== Personal life ==
Xie is a maternal cousin of Ong Ye Kung, Minister for Health and PAP MP for Sembawang GRC. Xie is married to Shara Ngiam, a regional vice-president at Lazada, since 2012.

== Notes ==
Parliament of Singapore
Preceded by Rahayu Mahzam; Tan Wu Meng; Ang Wei Neng; Desmond Lee; Tharman Shanmugaratnam	Member of Parliament for Jurong GRC; 2020–2025; Served alongside: Rahayu Mahzam, Tan Wu Meng, Shawn Huang, Tharman Shanmugaratnam	Constituency abolished
New constituency	Member of Parliament for Jurong Central SMC; 2025–present	Incumbent
Preceded by Jessica Tan; Christopher de Souza	Deputy Speaker; 2025–present Served alongside: Christopher de Souza	Incumbent
