= Ang Wei Neng =

Singaporean politician (born 1967)

The Honourable Ang Wei Neng
- 洪维能
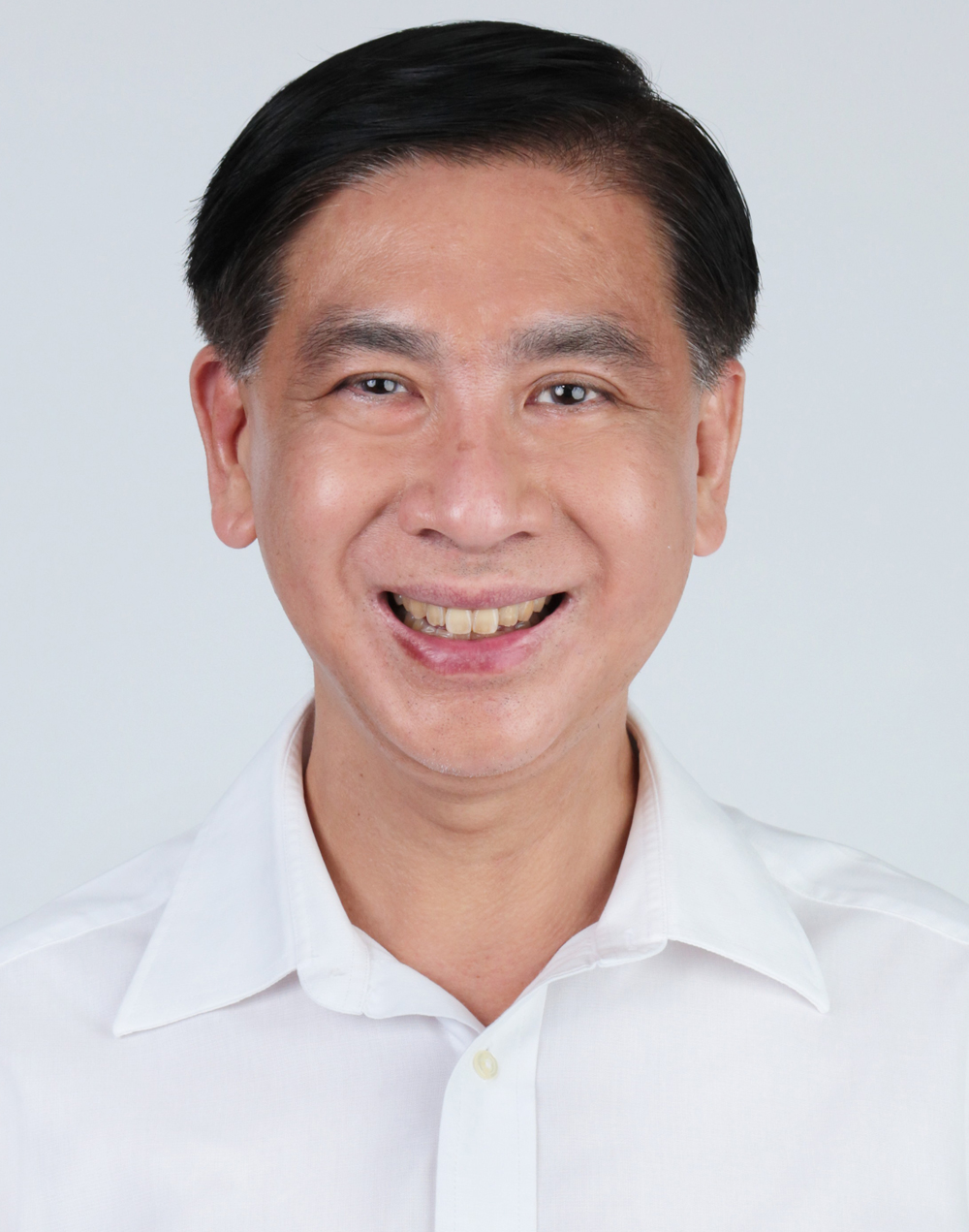
- Official portrait, 2021

Member of the Singapore Parliament for West Coast–Jurong West GRC
- Incumbent
- Assumed office 3 May 2025
- Preceded by: Constituency established
- Majority: 29,509 (19.98%)

Member of the Singapore Parliament for West Coast GRC
- In office 10 July 2020 – 15 April 2025
- Preceded by: PAP held
- Succeeded by: Constituency abolished
- Majority: 4,662 (3.36%)

Member of the Singapore Parliament for Jurong GRC
- In office 7 May 2011 – 23 June 2020
- Preceded by: Lim Boon Heng
- Succeeded by: Xie Yao Quan
- Majority: 2011: 38,809 (33.92%); 2015: 70,232 (58.56%)

Personal details
- Born: 31 March 1967 (age 59) Singapore
- Party: People's Action Party
- Education: National University of Singapore (BA, BSS); Nanyang Technological University (MBA)

Ang Wei Neng (Note: Chinese: 洪维能; pinyin: Hóng Wéinéng) (born 31 March 1967) is a Singaporean politician and business leader. A member of the governing People's Action Party (PAP), he has been the Member of Parliament (MP) for the Nanyang division of West Coast–Jurong West Group Representation Constituency (GRC) since 2025. He had previously represented the Nanyang division of West Coast GRC between 2020 and 2025 and the Jurong Central division of Jurong GRC between 2011 and 2020.

== Education ==
Ang was educated at The Chinese High School and Hwa Chong Junior College before graduating from the National University of Singapore with a Bachelor of Arts degree and a Bachelor of Social Sciences with honours degree under a scholarship conferred by the Public Service Commission (PSC).

He subsequently went on to complete a Master of Business Administration degree at the Nanyang Technological University.

== Career ==
Ang started his career in the Singapore Police Force and was Head of Operations and Training at the Ang Mo Kio Police Division. After that, he joined American International Group as a profit centre manager. Later he joined Bexcom as an assistant vice president before leaving to be a senior manager in Hiap Moh Corporation.

In 2004, Ang joined SBS Transit and held various positions in the organisation, including General Manager of District Operations, before rising to Head of Bus Operations and Senior Vice President. On 1 May 2017, he was appointed Chief Executive Officer of Taxi Business in ComfortDelGro and has been in that position until 2022. On 1 April 2022, he was appointed to run SMRT's taxi business, Strides Taxi, and was appointed CEO after Strides Taxi was merged with Premier Taxi to form Strides Premier.

=== Political career ===
Ang made his political debut in the 2011 general election when he joined a five-member People's Action Party (PAP) team contesting in Jurong GRC. After the PAP team won with 66.96% of the vote against the National Solidarity Party, Ang became a Member of Parliament representing the Jurong Central ward of Jurong GRC. He retained his parliamentary seat in the 2015 general election after the five-member PAP team contesting in Jurong GRC won with 79.28% of the vote against SingFirst. During the 2020 general election, Ang switched to join the five-member PAP team contesting in West Coast GRC and they won with 51.68% of the vote against the Progress Singapore Party. Ang thus became a Member of Parliament representing the Nanyang ward of West Coast GRC. Ang was appointed as Vice-Chairperson of West Coast Town Council (WCTC) since 2020.

In Parliament, Ang was a member of the Public Accounts Committee between 2015 and 2020, and has been a member of the Estimates Committee since 2011 before he became its chairman in 2020. He is a member of the Government Parliamentary Committees for Transport and Education, and the chairman of the Singapore-America Regional Parliamentary Group. He is the chairman of the Jurong Town Council and vice chairman of the South West Community Development Council.

During a parliamentary debate on 1 March 2022, Ang shared an idea of having a time stamp on Singapore's university degree and university graduates in Singapore will be required to attend upgrading courses once every five years. It drew criticism by locals, and some commented Ang's inability to distinguish between a university degree and job training. Ang later apologised for his remarks, he also made a post on Facebook clarifying that his suggestion on having a time stamp on degree certificates was not meant to be a policy recommendation.

== Personal life ==
Ang is a member of the management committee of Grace Orchard School, a school for students with special educational needs. In 2019, he was the chairman of the organising committee of the River Hongbao, an annual event held at Marina Bay during the Chinese New Year. He was also a former president of the Volleyball Association of Singapore.

== See also ==
- List of current Singapore MPs

== Notes ==
Parliament of Singapore
Preceded by Ong Chit Chung; Halimah Yacob; Lim Boon Heng; Tharman Shanmugaratnam; Grace Fu	Member of Parliament for Jurong GRC; 2011–2020; Served alongside: (2011-2015): David Ong, Halimah Yacob, Desmond Lee, Tharman Shanmugaratnam (2015-2020): Rahayu Mahzam, Tan Wu Meng, Desmond Lee, Tharman Shanmugaratnam	Succeeded by Rahayu Mahzam; Tan Wu Meng; Xie Yao Quan; Shawn Huang; Tharman Shanmugaratnam
Preceded by Foo Mee Har; Patrick Tay; Lim Hng Kiang; S. Iswaran	Member of Parliament for West Coast GRC; 2020–2025; Served alongside: Foo Mee Har, Desmond Lee, Rachel Ong, S. Iswaran	Constituency abolished
New constituency	Member of Parliament for West Coast–Jurong West GRC; 2025–present Served alongside: (2025-present): Cassandra Lee, Desmond Lee, Hamid Razak, Shawn Huang	Incumbent
