= Rahayu Mahzam =

Singaporean politician

The Honourable Rahayu Mahzam

Member of the Singapore Parliament for Jurong East–Bukit Batok GRC (Bukit Batok East Division)
- Incumbent
- Assumed office 3 May 2025
- Preceded by: Constituency created
- Majority: 69,350 (53.34%)

Member of the Singapore Parliament for Jurong GRC (Bukit Batok East Division)
- In office 11 September 2015 – 15 April 2025
- Preceded by: PAP held
- Succeeded by: Constituency abolished
- Majority: 2015: 70,359 (58.58%); 2020: 61,666 (55.37%)

Personal details
- Born: Rahayu binte Mahzam; 21 July 1980 (age 46) Singapore
- Party: People's Action Party
- Children: 1
- Education: National University of Singapore (LLB)
- Occupation: Politician; lawyer

Rahayu binte Mahzam (born 21 July 1980) is a Singaporean politician. A member of the governing People's Action Party (PAP), she has been serving as Minister of State for Health and Minister of State for Communications and Information concurrently since 2024. She was the Member of Parliament (MP) for the Bukit Batok East division of Jurong Group Representation Constituency (GRC) from 2015 to 2025 and then Bukit Batok East division of Jurong East–Bukit Batok GRC since 2025,

A lawyer by profession, Rahayu specialises in civil litigation and family law. She made her political debut in the 2015 general election as part of a five-member PAP team contesting in Jurong GRC and won 79.3% of the vote.

== Education ==
Rahayu studied at Raffles Girls' School and Raffles Junior College before she went to the National University of Singapore's Faculty of Law, where she completed a Bachelor of Laws in 2003 and was called to the Bar in 2004.

== Career ==
Rahayu joined Heng, Leong & Srinivasan LLC as a partner in January 2008, specialising in civil litigation and family law. In 2013, she left practice and served as Deputy Registrar at the Syariah Court of Singapore before returning to practice in August 2015. She is also an Associate Mediator accredited by the Singapore Mediation Centre.

=== Political career ===
In 2011, Rahayu was asked to stand for elections under the PAP. After discussing this with her then husband-to-be, she declined the offer, as she was planning to start a family.

In 2015, after being asked to stand for elections again, she raised the offer with her husband again. According to Rahayu, she accepted the offer on the understanding he agreed to her standing for office, but it subsequently emerged that "it was a misunderstanding on my part... I had thought that we already had that conversation. But actually, when it did happen, eventually I realised that he was not so comfortable with it".

Rahayu was announced as a PAP candidate on 20 August 2015 to join the five-member PAP team contesting in Jurong GRC during the 2015 general election. After the PAP team won with 79.29% of the vote against SingFirst, Rahayu became a Member of Parliament representing the Bukit Batok East ward of Jurong GRC. In 2017, she was part of the taskforce set up to implement tighter regulations on formula milk manufacturers.

During 2020 general election, Rahayu joined the five-member PAP team contesting in Jurong GRC again and they won with 74.62% of the vote against Red Dot United. Rahayu thus retained her parliamentary seat in Bukit Batok East and was appointed Parliamentary Secretary on 1 September 2020 at the Ministry of Health.

On 15 May 2021, she received an additional appointment as Parliamentary Secretary at the Ministry of Communications and Information. Rahayu was promoted to Senior Parliamentary Secretary at the Ministry of Health on 13 June 2022 with the Ministry of Law added to her portfolio while leaving her position at the Ministry of Communications and Information. In May 2024, during the appointment of the new Prime Minister of Singapore Lawrence Wong and his first Cabinet of Singapore, Rahayu was promoted to Minister of State in the Ministry of Health as well as the Ministry of Communications and Information, while relinquishing her appointment in the Ministry of Law.

== Personal life ==
Rahayu is the eldest of three children and her parents were a security officer and a civil servant.

Rahayu has been married to a civil servant since 2011. In 2015, it was reported that Rahayu and her husband had been trying for a child for a few years, and were undergoing IVF treatments to assist with this. On 7 April 2017, she gave birth to a son named Muhamad Ayden. It was subsequently reported that Ayden had Down Syndrome.

== Notes ==
Parliament of Singapore
Preceded by David Ong; Halimah Yacob; Ang Wei Neng; Desmond Lee; Tharman Shanmugaratnam	Member of Parliament for Jurong GRC; 2015–2025; Served alongside: (2015–2020): Tan Wu Meng, Ang Wei Neng, Desmond Lee, Tharman Shanmugaratnam (2020–2025): Tan Wu Meng, Xie Yao Quan, Shawn Huang, Tharman Shanmugaratnam	Constituency abolished
New constituency	Member of Parliament for Jurong East–Bukit Batok GRC; 2025–present Served alongside: (2025–present): Murali Pillai, David Hoe, Lee Hong Chuang, Grace Fu	Incumbent
