= Cassandra Lee =

Cassandra Lee may refer to:

- Cassandra Lee Morris, American voice actress
- Cassandra Lee (politician), Singaporean politician and lawyer
- Cassie Lee (gymnast), Canadian artistic gymnast
