= S. K. Ratnam =

Singaporean educator (1893–1994)

- Ratnam in his later years
- Born: Shanmugam Kanagaratnam; 1893; British Ceylon (present-day Sri Lanka)
- Died: 19 June 1994 (aged 101); Singapore
- Education: Methodist Boys' School, Kuala Lumpur
- Occupation: Educator
- Spouse: K. Achimuthu
- Children: 5; including Shanmugaratnam
- Relatives: Tharman Shanmugaratnam (grandson)

Shanmugam Kanagaratnam (1893 – 19 June 1994), better known as S. K. Ratnam, was a prominent educator who taught at the Anglo-Chinese Schools in Singapore, Penang, and Malacca, and at the Methodist Boys' School in Kuala Lumpur, where he served as headmaster. He was the father of academic K. Shanmugaratnam and the grandfather of the ninth president of Singapore Tharman Shanmugaratnam.

== Early life and education ==
Ratnam was born in Ceylon in 1893. He was the brother of S. Sivasampoo, who became a station master in Kuala Lumpur, and the nephew of Ampalavana Navalar, a disciple of Arumuka Navalar. He came to Malaya at the age of 15 and studied at the Methodist Boys' School in Kuala Lumpur. He did not go to university.

== Career ==
=== Teaching ===
On graduating in 1914, Ratnam decided to become a teacher. He taught in Kuala Lumpur, Malacca, Penang, and Singapore in this period. He was teaching at the Kuala Lumpur Methodist Boys' School by 1919. By 1921, he was a supervisor at the Anglo-Chinese School in Singapore. He was again a teacher at the Kuala Lumpur Methodist Boys' School by January 1932. In January 1936, he was transferred to Malacca to act as the principal of the Anglo-Chinese School there. He was also a teacher at the Anglo-Chinese School in Penang. During the Japanese occupation of Malaya, he was forced to teach in Japanese.

The British Malaya Administration, set up following the end of the Japanese occupation, authorised the reopening of the Kuala Lumpur Methodist Boys' School on 8 October 1945. However, the principal, Preston L. Peach, a missionary who had evacuated to America, had yet to return to Singapore, and Ratnam was instead appointed as the school's acting head as the school recovered from the occupation years until Peach finally returned in 1947. Ratnam was credited with the school's quick recovery. Additionally, he was also responsible for the preservation of 300 books from the school library, which was otherwise "totally destroyed".

He came to Singapore in 1950 and began teaching with the Anglo-Chinese School on Barker Road and at Coleman Street. He continued to teach there before retiring in 1959. In the last five years of his career, he worked under six principals who were previously students of his, including Thio Chan Bee. His students in this period included Tay Eng Soon, who would go on to become the Senior Minister of State for Education, and who recalled him as his favourite teacher. Tay remembered Ratnam as a "great storyteller" who "never followed the text strictly" and would often talk about his life experiences in class.

=== Clubs and associations ===
In 1922, Ratnam was elected the chairman of the literary department of the Singapore Ceylon Tamils Association (SCTA). He was also elected the chair of the Lanka Union. He was elected the honorary auditor of the SCTA in 1923. In 1929, Ratnam succeeded N. Alvapillay as a committee member of the Jaffnese Co-Operative Society on 31 January. However, he resigned from the post just six months later on 27 July, though he continued with the society as a member of its Committee of Management. He was elected to the committee of the Selangor Ceylon Tamil Association in 1930. In the 1930s, he served as the vice-president of the Tamilian Physical Cultural Association.

Ratnam was elected the treasurer of the Singapore Workers' Education Association in 1955. He was elected to the committee of the Tagore Society Singapore on its founding in 1956. He was also a founding member of the Ceylon Sports Club.

== Personal life and death ==
Ratnam was married to K. Achimuthu. They had five children; three sons and two daughters. One son and one daughter were born in Singapore, while the rest were born in Kuala Lumpur. His sons were pioneering pathologist K. Shanmugaratnam, diplomat K. Thamaratnam, and National University of Singapore dean K. J. Ratnam. His daughters were Gnanalakshmi Rajendram, the wife of Meteorological Service Singapore director K. Rajendram, and Vijaya Lakshmi Rajah, a singer and veena player who married judge and politician A. P. Rajah. Gnanalakshmi, Shanmugaratnam, and Thamaratnam were also musicians. Gnanalakshmi would also go on to be a teacher at the Anglo-Chinese School in Singapore after Ratnam had retired. His grandchildren included the ninth president of Singapore Tharman Shanmugaratnam and lawyer Chelva Retnam Rajah.

Ratnam died of natural causes on 19 June 1994. He had been bedridden for over a decade. The funeral was held on 21 June 1994 at Mount Vernon, where he was cremated.
