= Desmond Lee (Singaporean politician) =

Singaporean politician and lawyer (born 1976)

The Honourable Desmond Lee
- 李智陞
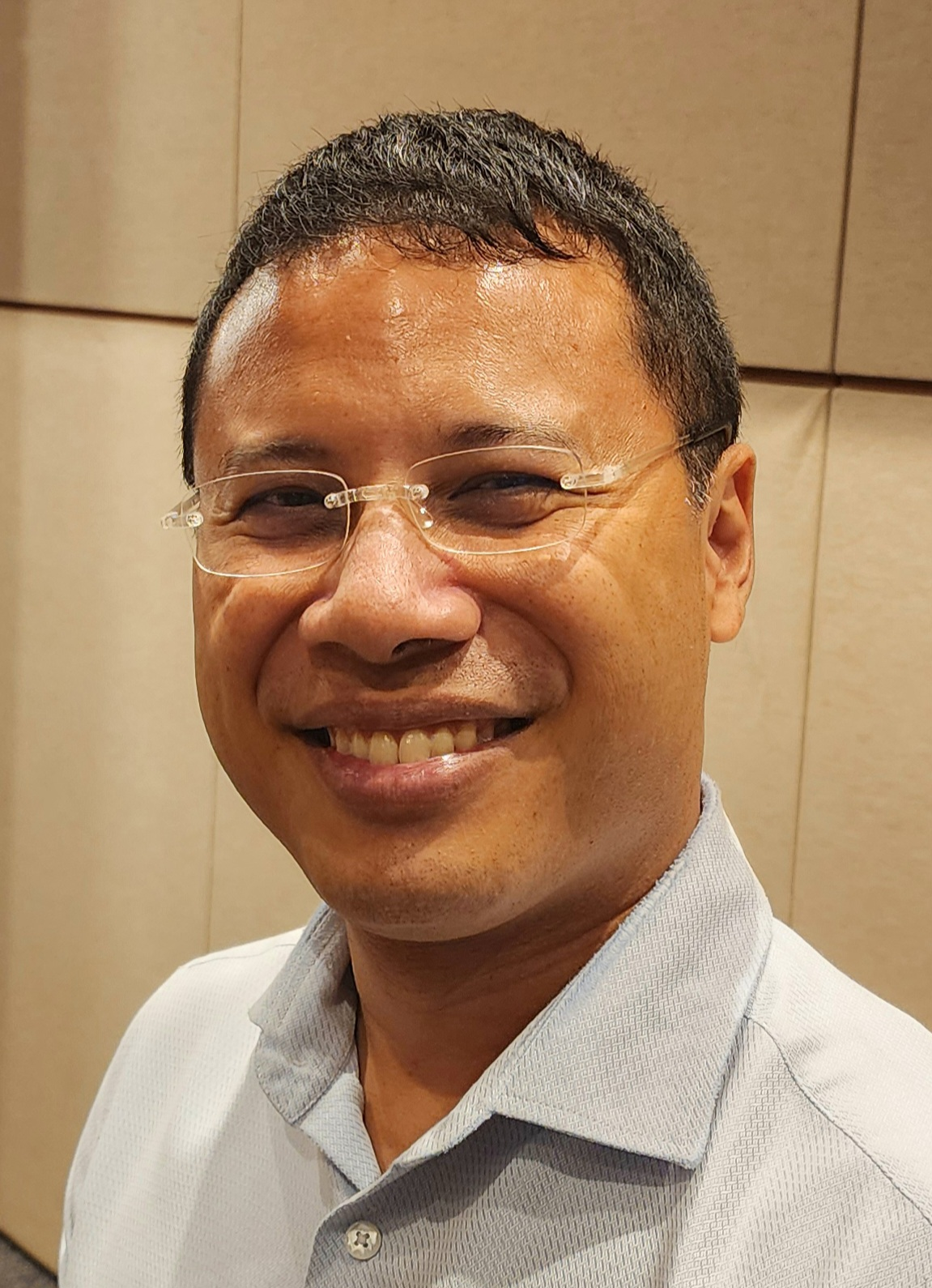
- Lee in 2025

Minister for Education
- Incumbent
- Assumed office 23 May 2025
- Prime Minister: Lawrence Wong
- Preceded by: Chan Chun Sing

Minister-in-charge of Social Services Integration
- Incumbent
- Assumed office 27 July 2020
- Prime Minister: Lee Hsien Loong; Lawrence Wong
- Preceded by: Office established

8th Chairman of the People's Action Party
- Incumbent
- Assumed office 29 May 2025
- Preceded by: Heng Swee Keat

Minister for National Development
- In office 27 July 2020 – 22 May 2025
- Prime Minister: Lee Hsien Loong; Lawrence Wong
- Second Minister: Indranee Rajah
- Preceded by: Lawrence Wong
- Succeeded by: Chee Hong Tat

Minister for Social and Family Development
- In office 11 September 2017 – 26 July 2020
- Prime Minister: Lee Hsien Loong
- Preceded by: Tan Chuan-Jin
- Succeeded by: Masagos Zulkifli

Minister in the Prime Minister's Office
- In office 1 May 2017 – 10 September 2017 Serving with Josephine Teo and Chan Chun Sing
- Prime Minister: Lee Hsien Loong

Second Minister for National Development
- In office 1 May 2017 – 26 July 2020
- Prime Minister: Lee Hsien Loong
- Minister: Lawrence Wong
- Preceded by: Lim Swee Say
- Succeeded by: Indranee Rajah

Second Minister for Home Affairs
- In office 1 May 2017 – 10 September 2017
- Prime Minister: Lee Hsien Loong
- Minister: K. Shanmugam
- Preceded by: S. Iswaran (2015); Masagos Zulkifli (2015)
- Succeeded by: Josephine Teo

8th Chairman of the People's Action Party
- Incumbent
- Assumed office 29 May 2025
- Preceded by: Heng Swee Keat

Deputy Leader of the House
- In office 1 October 2015 – 23 June 2020
- Prime Minister: Lee Hsien Loong
- Leader: Grace Fu
- Preceded by: Heng Chee How
- Succeeded by: Zaqy Mohamad

Member of the Singapore Parliament for West Coast–Jurong West GRC
- Incumbent
- Assumed office 3 May 2025
- Preceded by: Constituency established
- Majority: 29,509 (19.98%)

Member of the Singapore Parliament for West Coast GRC
- In office 10 July 2020 – 15 April 2025
- Preceded by: PAP held
- Succeeded by: Constituency abolished
- Majority: 4,662 (3.36%)

Member of the Singapore Parliament for Jurong GRC
- In office 7 May 2011 – 23 June 2020
- Preceded by: PAP held
- Succeeded by: PAP held
- Majority: 2011: 38,809 (33.92%); 2015: 70,359 (58.58%)

Personal details
- Born: Desmond Lee Ti-Seng; 15 July 1976 (age 50) Singapore
- Party: People's Action Party
- Children: 3
- Parent: Lee Yock Suan (father)
- Education: National University of Singapore (LLB); University of Oxford (BCL)
- Occupation: Politician

Desmond Lee Ti-Seng (Note: Chinese: 李智陞; Pe̍h-ōe-jī: Lí Tì-seng; pinyin: Lǐ Zhìshēng) (born 15 July 1976) is a Singaporean politician and lawyer who has served as the chairperson of the People's Action Party since 2025 and has been serving as Minister for Education since 2025 and Minister-in-charge of Social Services Integration since 2020. A member of the governing People's Action Party (PAP), he has been the Member of Parliament (MP) for the Boon Lay division of West Coast–Jurong West Group Representation Constituency (GRC) since 2025. He had previously represented the Boon Lay division of West Coast GRC from 2020 to 2025, and the Jurong Spring division of Jurong GRC from 2011 to 2020.

A lawyer by profession, Lee had worked at various public-sector institutions, including the Supreme Court, Attorney-General's Chambers, the Ministry of Law, the Ministry of Home Affairs before entering politics. He made his political debut in the 2011 general election as part of a five-member PAP team contesting in Jurong GRC and won with 66.96% of the vote. He had held various political positions in the Ministry of National Development and Ministry of Home Affairs before he was made full member of the Cabinet on 1 May 2017. He forms part of the new Cabinet selected by Lawrence Wong announced in May 2024.

== Early life and education ==
Lee's father is Lee Yock Suan, a former Member of Parliament and Cabinet minister. Of Hokkien ancestry from his father's side, Lee also has Peranakan ancestry from his mother's side.

Lee was educated at Anglo-Chinese School (Junior), Raffles Institution and Raffles Junior College before graduating from the National University of Singapore in 2001 with a Bachelor of Laws with first class honours degree. He subsequently went on to complete a Bachelor of Civil Law degree (a Masters-equivalent degree) at the University of Oxford.

== Legal career ==
Upon his graduation from the NUS Faculty of Law in 2001, Lee served as Justices' Law Clerk at the Supreme Court before serving as a deputy public prosecutor in the Criminal Justice Division of the Attorney-General's Chambers (AGC).

Lee then served as deputy director of the Legal Branch of the Ministry of Health (MOH) between 2005 and 2009 before being transferred to the Ministry of Law, where he served as deputy director of the Legal Policy Division until 2011.

In March 2011, Lee joined Temasek Holdings as an associate director in the Legal and Regulations Department.

== Political career ==
Lee made his political debut in the 2011 general election as part of a five-member People's Action Party (PAP) team contesting in Jurong GRC and won 66.96% of the vote. Lee was subsequently elected as the Member of Parliament representing the Jurong Spring division of Jurong GRC.

Following the 2011 general election, Lee served as a member of the Government Parliamentary Committees for Culture, Community and Youth, Home Affairs, Law, and Social and Family Development.

On 1 September 2013, Lee was appointed Minister of State for National Development and left Temasek Holdings to take on this role.

At the 2015 general election, Lee was re-elected as a Member of Parliament for Jurong GRC. The PAP team contesting in Jurong GRC won 79.3% of the vote. In October 2015, Lee was promoted to Senior Minister of State for National Development, and was appointed Senior Minister of State for Home Affairs. On 1 May 2017, he was appointed full minister and took up the portfolio of Minister in the Prime Minister's Office, Second Minister for Home Affairs and Second Minister for National Development. He was also Deputy Leader of the House from October 2015 to June 2020.

On 11 September 2017, Lee relinquished his portfolio at the Prime Minister's Office and Ministry of Home Affairs, and became Minister for Social and Family Development while retaining his portfolio as Second Minister for National Development after Tan Chuan-Jin was elected as Speaker of Parliament.

At the 2020 general election, Lee was part of the five-member PAP team contesting in West Coast GRC and won against the Progress Singapore Party (PSP) with 51.69% of the vote. He was subsequently elected as the Member of Parliament representing the Boon Lay division of West Coast GRC.

Following a Cabinet reshuffle on 27 July 2020, Lee succeeded Lawrence Wong as Minister for National Development and took on an additional newly created role of Minister-in-charge of Social Services Integration under the Ministry of Social and Family Development.

On 8 November 2020, Lee, along with Lawrence Wong, was elected to the PAP's Central Executive Committee (CEC) for the first time.

Lee stood for election in the 2025 general election, leading the PAP team, which defeated the PSP with 59.99% of the vote, in the redrawn West Coast–Jurong West GRC. He was appointed Minister of Education after the Cabinet was reshuffled by Prime Minister Lawrence Wong. On 29 May, Lee was appointed as the 8th Chairman of the People's Action Party following a reshuffle in the Party's Central Executive Committee, thus relinquishing his role as 2nd Assistant Secretary-General.

== Personal life ==
Lee is married with three children.

== Notes ==
Political offices
Preceded by Tan Chuan-Jin	Minister for Social and Family Development; 2017–2020	Succeeded by Masagos Zulkifli
Preceded by Lawrence Wong	Minister for National Development; 2020–2025	Succeeded by Chee Hong Tat
Preceded by Chan Chun Sing	Minister for Education; 2025–present	Incumbent
Parliament of Singapore
Preceded by Ong Chit Chung; Halimah Yacob; Lim Boon Heng; Tharman Shanmugaratnam; Grace Fu	Member of Parliament for Jurong GRC; 2011–2020; Served alongside: (2011-2015): David Ong, Halimah Yacob, Ang Wei Neng, Tharman Shanmugaratnam (2015-2020): Rahayu Mahzam, Tan Wu Meng, Ang Wei Neng, Tharman Shanmugaratnam	Succeeded by Rahayu Mahzam; Tan Wu Meng; Xie Yao Quan; Shawn Huang; Tharman Shanmugaratnam
Preceded by Foo Mee Har; Patrick Tay; Lim Hng Kiang; S. Iswaran	Member of Parliament for West Coast GRC; 2020–2025; Served alongside: Foo Mee Har, Ang Wei Neng, Rachel Ong, S. Iswaran	Constituency abolished
New constituency	Member of Parliament for West Coast–Jurong West GRC; 2025–present Served alongside: (2025-present): Cassandra Lee, Ang Wei Neng, Hamid Razak, Shawn Huang	Incumbent
