= National Jobs Council of Singapore =

Singaporean High Level Council

The National Jobs Council (NJC) is a 17-member high-level council aimed at job creation and training. Formed in 2020 by the Singapore Government, the mission of the National Jobs Council is to identify and develop job opportunities and skills training for Singaporeans during the COVID-19 pandemic; it supports the "whole-of-nation approach" to preserve existing jobs and match Singaporeans with job openings. The council is chaired by Tharman Shanmugaratnam.

== History ==
On 26 May 2020, Deputy Prime Minister Heng Swee Keat announced the plan to set up the National Jobs Council in his fourth Budget.
