= K. Shanmugaratnam =

Singaporean pathologist (1921–2018)

- கனகரத்தினம் சண்முகரத்தினம்
- Official portrait as Master of the Academy of Medicine, 1966–1968
- Born: 2 April 1921; Singapore, Straits Settlements
- Died: 28 July 2018 (aged 97); Singapore
- Education: King Edward VII College of Medicine; University of London
- Occupation: Pathologist
- Children: 3; including Tharman

Kanagaratnam Shanmugaratnam (Tamil: கனகரத்தினம் சண்முகரத்தினம்; 2 April 1921 – 28 July 2018), better known as K. Shanmugaratnam, was a Singaporean histopathologist considered Singapore's "father of pathology". He was known for his research on nasopharyngeal carcinoma and founded the Singapore Cancer Registry.

== Early life and education ==
Born in Singapore in 1921, Shanmugaratnam was one of five children, and was of Ceylonese Tamil Hindu descent. His father, S. K. Ratnam, was a teacher.

After his completing secondary school education at Victoria School, Shanmugaratnam enrolled into the King Edward VII College of Medicine in 1937, but his education was disrupted by World War II and the Japanese occupation. He eventually graduated in 1947.

As an undergraduate, Shanmugaratnam was noted as a well-rounded student who excelled in cricket, won various academic prizes and served as president of the medical school students' union.

Shanmugaratnam was awarded a fellowship and completed his doctorate at the University of London Postgraduate Medical School in 1957.

== Career ==
During the Japanese occupation, Shanmugaratnam worked as a laboratory technician to avoid being conscripted by the Japanese forces as a manual labourer. After obtaining his medical licence, he joined the Government Medical Service as a pathologist. In 1950, keen on observing local disease patterns, he started a simple card index of all histologically-diagnosed cancers in Singapore. At that time, the government's pathology department was responsible for the entire country's histology services.

In 1967, Shanmugaratnam spearheaded the founding of the Singapore Cancer Registry (SCR) in the University of Singapore's department of pathology with the financial backing of the International Agency for Research on Cancer and the Singapore Cancer Society. It was the first comprehensive, population-based cancer registry in Southeast Asia. At that time, his team consisted of another researcher and two secretaries. As the population of Singapore grew and the scale of the project expanded over the years, the SCR was transferred to the Ministry of Health in 2001 and is now administered by the National Registry of Diseases Office. As a researcher, his main area of expertise was in nasopharyngeal carcinoma, a type of cancer with high incidence rates in Southeast Asia and southern China, where a large percentage of the regional ethnic Chinese diaspora trace their ancestry to.

Shanmugaratnam was a contributor to the development of medical education in Singapore, specifically postgraduate training for licensed local doctors. During the late 1960s, then-Deputy Prime Minister Toh Chin Chye, a former academic at the University of Singapore, made local headlines for censuring the university's medical faculty over their failure to formalise postgraduate medical education and the awarding of local qualifications; he specifically requested Shanmugaratnam, then the Master of the Academy of Medicine, to chair a committee which would oversee this endeavour. This was achieved by 1970 and allowed local doctors to complete specialty training in domestic hospitals under the auspices of the university, with external validation from regulatory bodies in the United Kingdom and Australia, rather than the costlier option of spending several years abroad.

He was appointed Emeritus Professor by NUS in 1986 and continued to lecture and conduct seminars into his early nineties. Throughout the course of his career, he had been a member of various committees and bodies, such as the Academy of Medicine, the Singapore Medical Council and the Union for International Cancer Control.

== Personal life ==
Shanmugaratnam had three children, one of whom is statesman and economist Tharman Shanmugaratnam, who served as Deputy Prime Minister of Singapore between 2011 and 2019 and is the 9th and current president of Singapore.

He died on 28 July 2018, at the age of 97, at his home in Singapore.
