= Yip Hon Weng =

Singaporean politician (born 1977)

The Honourable Yip Hon Weng
- 叶汉荣
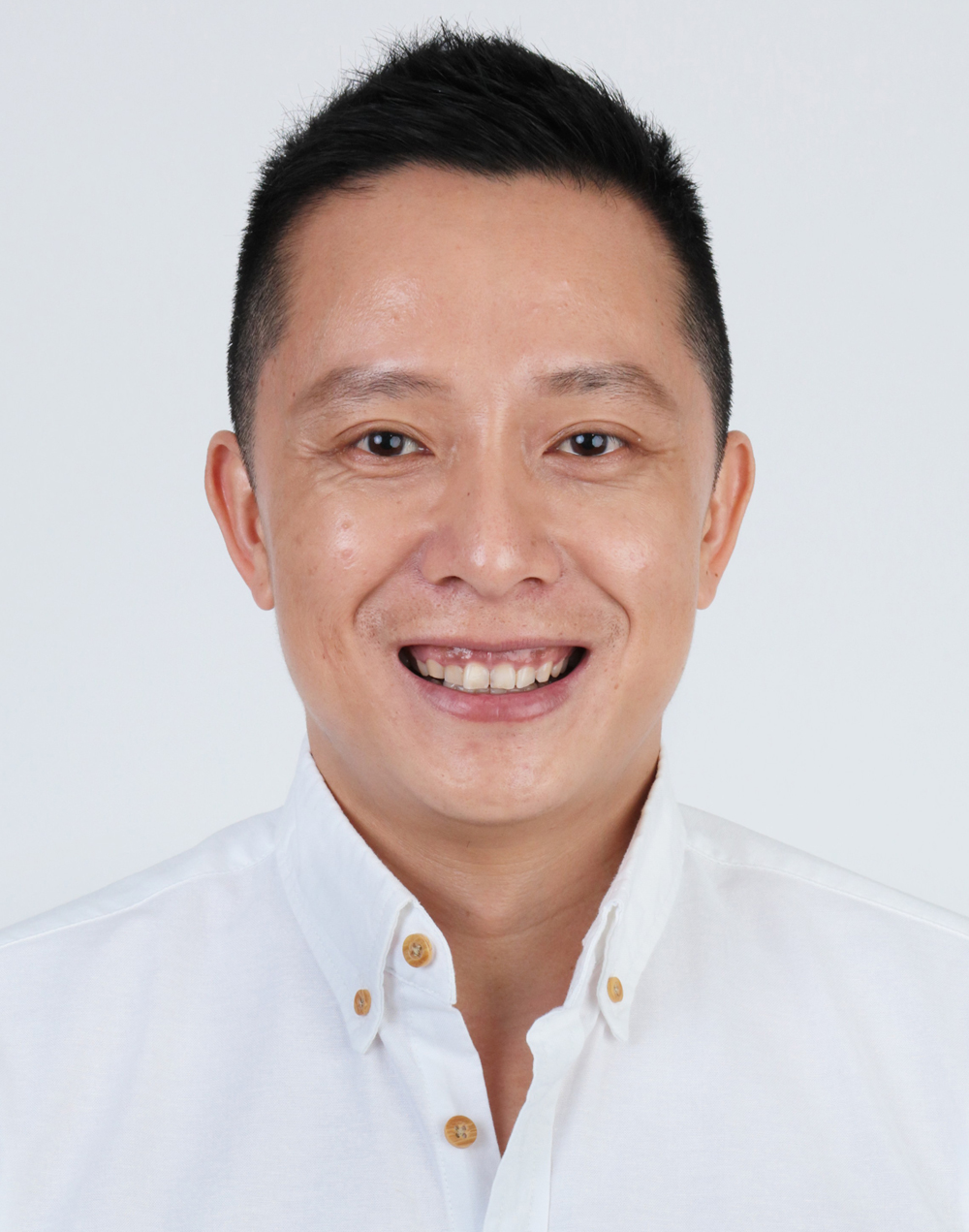
- Official portrait, 2021

Member of the Singapore Parliament for Yio Chu Kang SMC
- Incumbent
- Assumed office 11 July 2020
- Preceded by: Constituency established
- Majority: 2020: 14,775 (60.82%); 2025: 18,066 (78.75%)

Personal details
- Born: 1977 (age 48–49) Singapore
- Party: People's Action Party
- Education: Loughborough University; University of Exeter; Harvard University; National University of Singapore; Nanyang Technological University; Massachusetts Institute of Technology
- Occupation: Politician; civil servant; teacher

Yip Hon Weng (Note: Chinese: 叶汉荣; Jyutping: Jip^{6} Hon^{3} Wing^{4}) (born 1977) is a Singaporean politician. A member of the governing People's Action Party (PAP), he has been the Member of Parliament (MP) for Yio Chu Kang Single Member Constituency (SMC) since 2020.

== Education ==
Yip graduated from Loughborough University with a bachelor's degree with First class Honours in Physical Education, Sports Science and Mathematics under a Public Service Commission (PSC) overseas scholarship. He is also a Sloan Fellow and has a Master of Business Administration degree at the Massachusetts Institute of Technology under a Administrative Service Postgraduate Scholarship conferred by the Singaporean government.

== Political career ==
Yip was fielded in the 2020 general election as a solo PAP candidate contesting in Yio Chu Kang SMC against the Progress Singapore Party (PSP).

On 11 July 2020, Yip was declared an elected Member of Parliament (MP) representing Yio Chu Kang SMC in the 14th Parliament after garnering almost 61% of the vote against PSP's Kayla Low.

In the 2025 general election, Yip ran for reelection in Yio Chu Kang SMC against People's Alliance for Reform's candidate Michael Fang Amin.

On 4 May 2025, Yip was re-elected as a Member of Parliament (MP) representing Yio Chu Kang SMC in the 15th Parliament after garnering 78.75% of the vote against Fang's 21.25%.

== Personal life ==
Yip is married and has five children.

== Notes ==
Parliament of Singapore
New constituency	Member of Parliament for Yio Chu Kang SMC; 2020–present	Incumbent
