= Shawn Huang =

Singaporean politician (born 1982)

The Honourable Shawn Huang PBM
- 黄伟中
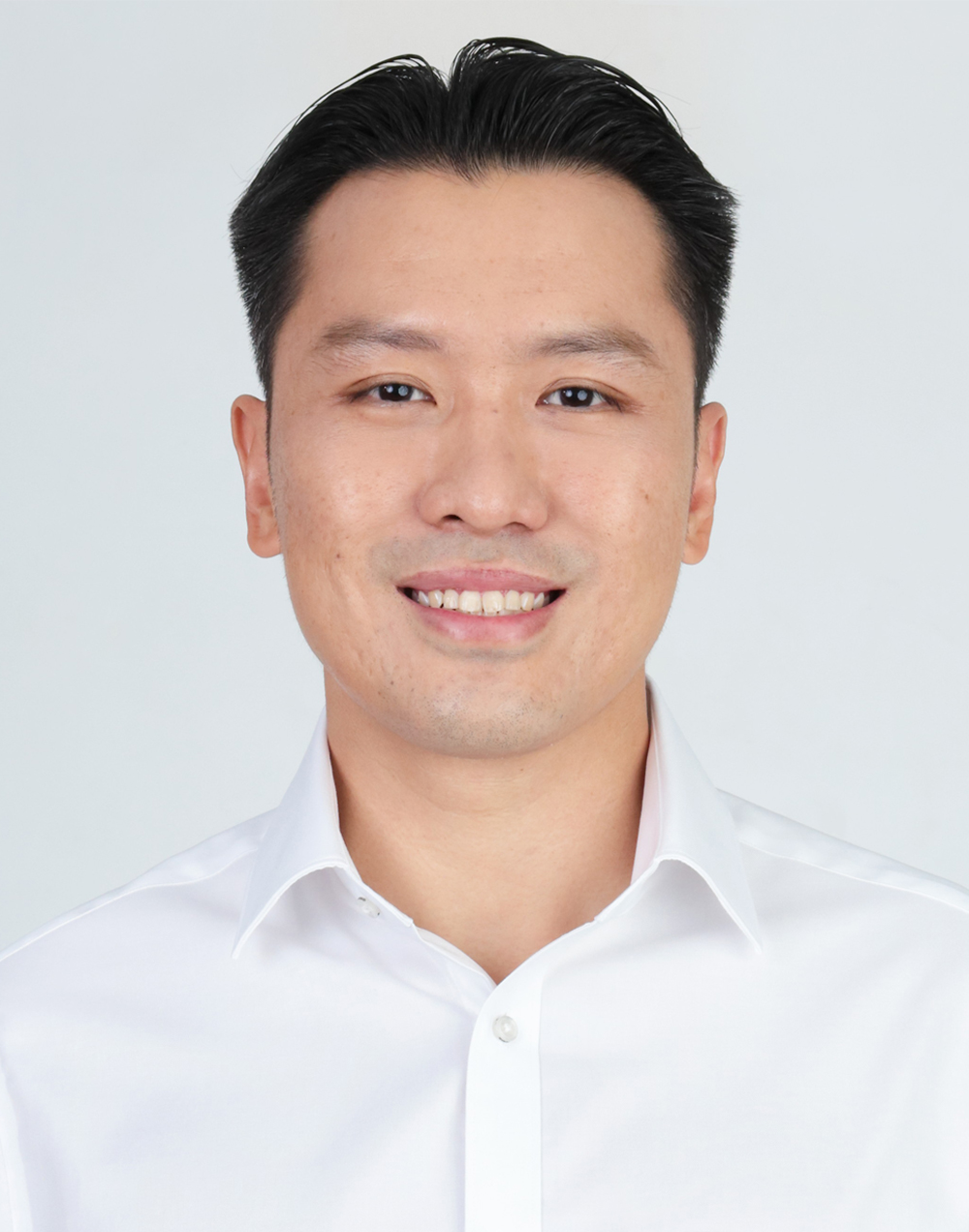
- Official portrait, 2021

Member of the Singapore Parliament for West Coast–Jurong West GRC
- Incumbent
- Assumed office 3 May 2025
- Preceded by: Constituency established
- Majority: 29,509 (19.98%)

Member of the Singapore Parliament for Jurong GRC
- In office 10 July 2020 – 15 April 2025
- Preceded by: PAP held
- Succeeded by: Constituency abolished
- Majority: 60,501 (49.24%)

Personal details
- Born: Shawn Wei Zhong Ingkiriwang; 19 July 1982 (age 44) Singapore
- Party: People's Action Party
- Children: 2
- Education: United States Air Force Academy (BS)
- Occupation: Politician; former fighter pilot

Military service
- Branch/service: Republic of Singapore Air Force
- Years of service: 2000–2018
- Rank: Lieutenant-Colonel

Shawn Huang Wei Zhong (Note: Chinese: 黄伟中; pinyin: Huáng Wěizhōng) PBM (né Ingkiriwang; born 19 July 1982) is a Singaporean politician. A member of the People's Action Party (PAP), he has been the Member of Parliament (MP) for the Taman Jurong division of West Coast–Jurong West Group Representation Constituency (GRC) since 2025. He had previously represented the Jurong Spring division of Jurong GRC between 2020 and 2025.

Huang has also been serving as Senior Parliamentary Secretary with the Ministry of Manpower and Ministry of Finance since 2025. Prior to entering politics, he served as an F-16 fighter pilot in the Singaporean Air Force (RSAF) between 2000 and 2018. He has also been a director at Tasek Jurong, a charity organisation, since 2014.

== Early life and education ==
Huang completed his Secondary school education at Catholic High School, Singapore. He graduated with a Bachelor of Science in aeronautical engineering from the United States Air Force Academy in 2006. In 2015, he was awarded the Lee Kuan Yew Scholarship.

== Career ==
=== Military career ===
Huang joined the Republic of Singapore Air Force as a pilot trainee in 2001 and has over 1,000 flying hours on the CT4B, S211, A-4 Super Skyhawk and F-16 Fighting Falcon. He held several staff and operational appointments and was the Commanding Officer of the 140 Squadron.

On 14 September 2017, Huang was the parade commander for President Halimah Yacob's inauguration ceremony held at the Istana.

On 9 August 2018, Huang was the parade commander for Singapore's 53rd National Day Parade, in conjunction with the Republic of Singapore Air Force's 50th anniversary.

=== Political career ===
Huang was fielded for the 2020 general election as one of five candidates representing the People's Action Party (PAP) in Jurong GRC. On 11 July 2020, Huang was declared an elected Member of the 14th Parliament.

On 13 May 2024, Huang was appointed as senior parliamentary secretary in the Ministry of Education and Ministry of Finance.

== Controversies ==
Public criticism arose over confusion surrounding Huang's change of surname prior to the 2020 Singaporean general election. Of Chinese Indonesian descent, Huang's birth name was Shawn Wei Zhong Ingkiriwang. According to Huang, his great-grandfather, an Indonesian Chinese, had changed the original Chinese surname "Huang" to the more Indonesian-sounding "Ingkiriwang", as Chinese Indonesians faced social and political pressure to adopt Indonesian-style names.

In 1989, Huang executed a deed poll in Singapore to revert to the original surname "Huang". However, due to what he described as administrative confusion, he continued to be publicly identified as "Ingkiriwang" as late as 2018, including when he served as parade commander for Singapore's 53rd National Day Parade (NDP). Another controversy emerged over Huang's conduct during that same NDP rehearsal, where reports alleged that he had thrown lunch boxes at a fellow military volunteer after not receiving his own. Huang later denied the allegation, stating that he had returned the lunch boxes politely, with two warrant officers (WOs) serving as witnesses.

Huang came under public scrutiny again during the campaign for the 2025 Singaporean general election, after grassroots volunteers from Taman Jurong, a ward under his charge, were reported to have attempted to disrupt and harass Progress Singapore Party (PSP) candidates conducting walkabouts. The incident followed the circulation online, on 30 April, of leaked WhatsApp messages from a group named "TJ PAP". On this occasion, Huang declined to comment and limited interactions on his social media platforms, while the group was later disbanded.

== Awards ==
In 2019, Huang was awarded the Public Service Medal.

== Personal life ==
Huang is married with two children.

== Notes ==
Parliament of Singapore
Preceded by Rahayu Mahzam; Tan Wu Meng; Ang Wei Neng; Desmond Lee; Tharman Shanmugaratnam	Member of Parliament for Jurong GRC; 2020–2025	Constituency abolished
New constituency	Member of Parliament for West Coast–Jurong West GRC; 2025–present Served alongside: (2025–present): Desmond Lee, Ang Wei Neng, Hamid Razak, Cassandra Lee	Incumbent
