= Hamid Razak =

Singaporean politician

The Honourable Hamid Razak
- ஹமீது ரசாக்

Member of the Singapore Parliament for West Coast–Jurong West GRC
- Incumbent
- Assumed office 3 May 2025
- Preceded by: Constituency established
- Majority: 29,509 (19.98%)

Personal details
- Born: Hamid Rahmatullah Abdul Razak; 1985 (age 40–41)
- Party: People's Action Party
- Education: National University of Singapore
- Occupation: Orthopaedic surgeon, politician

Hamid Rahmatullah Abdul Razak (Note: Tamil: ஹமீது ரஹ்மத்துல்லாஹ் அப்துல் ரசாக், romanized: Hamītu Rahmattullāh Aptul Racāk) (born 1985) is a Singaporean politician, orthopaedic surgeon, and academic. Hamid was elected to the Parliament of Singapore in the 2025 general election. He represents the Jurong Spring division in West Coast-Jurong West Group Representation Constituency as a member of the People's Action Party.

== Medical career ==
Hamid is known for his subspecialty expertise in knee preservation and orthopaedic sports surgery. He previously led the Sports and Joint Preserving Osteotomy Service at Sengkang General Hospital and served as Site Chief for SingHealth’s Sports & Exercise Medicine Centre.

He has published over 120 articles in peer-reviewed journals and is frequently invited to speak at international conferences. He also trains regional surgeons and serves on editorial boards including BMC Musculoskeletal Disorders and Arthroplasty.

== Political career ==
Hamid entered politics under the PAP and was elected in the 2025 Singaporean general election, representing Jurong Spring–Gek Poh in the newly formed West Coast–Jurong West GRC. He succeeded Shawn Huang who represented Taman Jurong. Hamid has served as the Chairman of the West Coast–Jurong West Town Council since 2025. His areas of focus include healthcare accessibility, health literacy, youth mentorship, and social mobility.

== Personal life ==
Hamid is married with three children.

== Notes ==
Parliament of Singapore
New constituency	Member of Parliament for West Coast–Jurong West GRC; 2025–present Served alongside: (2025–present): Desmond Lee, Ang Wei Neng, Cassandra Lee, Shawn Huang	Incumbent
