= Lim Boon Heng =

Singaporean politician

- 林文兴
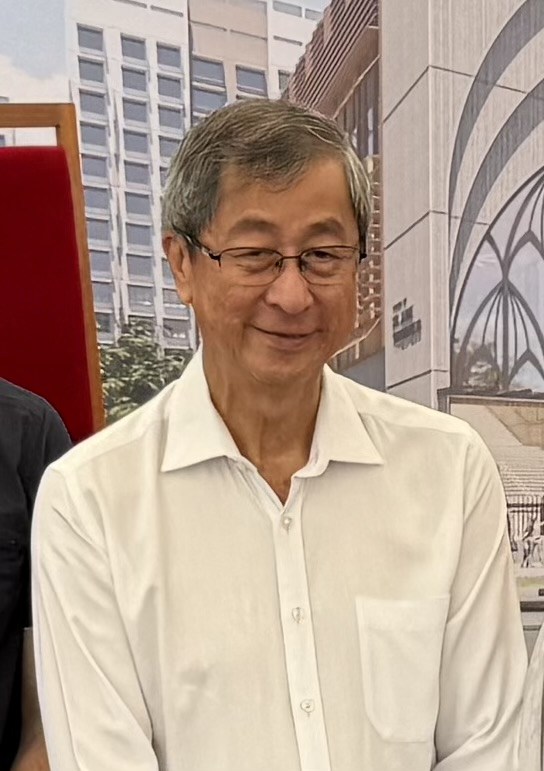
- Lim in 2025

4th Chairman of the People's Action Party
- In office 3 December 2004 – 31 May 2011
- Preceded by: Tony Tan
- Succeeded by: Khaw Boon Wan

Minister in the Prime Minister's Office
- In office 23 November 2001 – 20 May 2011
- Prime Minister: Goh Chok Tong; Lee Hsien Loong

Minister without portfolio
- In office 27 July 1993 – 22 November 2001
- Prime Minister: Goh Chok Tong

Secretary-General of the National Trades Union Congress
- In office 11 October 1993 – 31 December 2006
- Deputy: Heng Chee How
- Preceded by: Ong Teng Cheong
- Succeeded by: Lim Swee Say'

Second Minister for Trade and Industry
- In office 1 July 1993 – October 1993

Senior Minister of State for Trade and Industry
- In office 7 September 1991 – July 1993

Deputy Speaker of the Parliament of Singapore
- In office 16 January 1989 – 13 August 1991
- Preceded by: Tan Soo Khoon
- Succeeded by: Abdullah Tarmugi

Member of the Singapore Parliament for Jurong GRC (Jurong Central)
- In office 3 November 2001 – 7 May 2011
- Preceded by: Kenneth Chen Koon Lap
- Succeeded by: Ang Wei Neng

Member of the Singapore Parliament for Bukit Timah GRC (Ulu Pandan)
- In office 2 January 1997 – 3 November 2001
- Preceded by: Himself
- Succeeded by: Vivian Balakrishnan

Member of the Singapore Parliament for Ulu Pandan SMC
- In office 31 August 1991 – 2 January 1997
- Preceded by: Dixie Tan
- Succeeded by: Himself

Member of the Singapore Parliament for Kebun Baru SMC
- In office 23 December 1980 – 14 August 1991
- Preceded by: Constituency established
- Succeeded by: Constituency abolished

Personal details
- Born: Lim Boon Heng; 18 November 1947 (age 78) Colony of Singapore
- Party: People's Action Party (1980–2011)
- Spouse: Florence Chia
- Children: 2
- Education: Newcastle University

Lim Boon Heng (Note: Chinese: 林文兴; Pe̍h-ōe-jī: Lîm Bûn-heng; pinyin: Lín Wénxīng) (born 18 November 1947) is a Singaporean trade unionist and former politician. A former member of the governing People's Action Party (PAP), he was a Member of Parliament (MP) between 1980 and 2011, and had served in the Cabinet between 2001 and 2011. He served as Chairman of the People's Action Party between 2004 and 2011.

After retiring from politics, Lim has served as the chairman of Temasek Holdings and NTUC Enterprise Co-operative since 2013 and 2012 respectively, until his retirement in October 2025.

Lim had also served as Deputy Chairman of the Singapore Labour Foundation, Secretary-General of the National Trades Union Congress (NTUC) and Deputy Chairman of the People's Association.

== Early life and education ==
Lim grew up in a small farm in Punggol, Singapore. He studied at Montfort Junior School (1955–1960) and Montfort Secondary School (1961–1966). In 1967, Lim was awarded a Colombo Plan Scholarship to study naval architecture at the University of Newcastle-upon-Tyne.

In 1971, he was awarded a one-year NORAD (Norwegian) Fellowship for practical training in Oslo, leading to a diploma in international shipping inspection.

== Career ==
Upon graduation in 1970, Lim joined Neptune Orient Lines (NOL) as a naval architect. Lim was assigned overseas twice to supervise the construction of NOL's new ships - Denmark (1972–1974) and Japan (1976–1977). He was promoted to Manager of Corporate Planning in 1978, while concurrently holding the post of Manager of Liner Services.

=== Political career ===
Lim was approached by former NOL colleague Goh Chok Tong to contest in the 1980 general election. Lim contested in the Kebun Baru SMC and was later elected the Member of Parliament (MP) for Kebun Baru (1980–1991).

In 1984, Lim raised the concept of town council, and was appointed the chairman of Ang Mo Kio West Town Council, the first in the country, in 1986. He was the MP for the Ulu Pandan division of Bukit Timah GRC (1991–2001) and the Jurong Central division of Jurong GRC (2001–2011).

Lim was Chairman of the Government Parliamentary Committee (GPC) for Labour (1987–1991) and Deputy Speaker of Parliament (1989–1991).

Lim was appointed Senior Minister of State for the Ministry of Trade and Industry in 1991 and later became the Second Minister for the same ministry in 1993. In October, Lim was appointed as Minister without portfolio in October 1993 (later renamed as Minister in the Prime Minister's Office).

In 1996, he was the Treasurer of the PAP Central Executive Committee and went on to become the Chairman of the PAP Central Executive Committee in 2004. In 2007, Lim was appointed Chairman of the Ministerial Committee on Ageing to oversee issues related to Singapore's rapidly ageing population.

Lim announced his retirement from politics in 2011 before the general elections. Lim teared up while responding to the media on whether there was groupthink among PAP politicians. He recounted how the Cabinet was deeply split over whether to set up a casino in Singapore and his struggle with the decision.

=== Trade union career ===
Lim has a long career with the trade union in Singapore. He spent 26 years at the National Trades Union Congress, with the last 13 as its Secretary-General. He rose from the position of Deputy Director (1981–1983) to Assistant Secretary-General (1983–1987) and Deputy Secretary-General (1987–1991). Thereafter, he had a two-year stint at the Ministry of Trade and Industry (1991–1993). Upon his return to the NTUC, he was elected Secretary-General and served for another four terms until he stepped down in December 2006 to make way for Lim Swee Say.

Lim is Chairman of NTUC Eldercare since 2000 and Deputy Chairman of Singapore Labour Foundation since 1997. Following his retirement from NTUC, Lim helps to oversee the labour movement's network of nine cooperatives. He is currently Chairman of the Social Enterprises Development Council.

Lim served as a member on the National Wages Council from 1981 to 1991. Lim was instrumental in pushing for a flexible wage system to help older workers keep their jobs and to preserve jobs during difficult economic times.

Lim was able to persuade union leaders to support the Central Provident Fund (CPF) cuts and reform during the 1998 recession. He also rallied union leaders and workers to support the restructuring of key companies like PSA International and Singapore Airlines (SIA).

Aware of the many criticisms of his wearing the two hats - that of NTUC chief and Minister in the Cabinet, Lim argued that this arrangement gave labour a place to influence public policy-making at the highest level. He opined that both trade unions and government have the same objective - to better the lives of workers.

Lim was also the Executive Secretary of SMMWU (1981–1991) and advisor to 11 unions affiliated to the NTUC. He was also Chairman of NTUC Pasir Ris Resort Management Committee (1988–1992), Chairman of NTUC Club (1993–2006) and Appointing Governor of the Ong Teng Cheong Institute of Labour Studies (OTC-ILS) (1993–2006).

In 2007, the NTUC honoured Lim with the Distinguished Comrade of Labour for his contributions to the trade union movement. The NTUC recognises Lim as having played a key role in building trust among tripartite partners in the tumultuous 1990s when Singapore was rocked by recessions, job losses, and economic restructuring.

In 2013, the Lim Boon Heng Scholarship was launched to help Singaporean students who are residents of Jurong Central and Jurong Spring constituencies who have applied for admission into or are pursuing higher education in Singapore universities.

=== Other appointments ===
Lim was Chairman of the National Productivity Board (1991–2003), later known as the Productivity and Standards Board and subsequently the Standards, Productivity and Innovation Board (SPRING Singapore). Lim was also Chairman of the Skills Development Council (1999–2002).

Lim was the Chairman of the Cost Review Committee to look into cost of living in Singapore. (CRC1993 and CRC1996).

After Lim's retirement from politics in 2011, he joined Temasek Holdings as a director in June 2012. In July 2013, the investment company announced his appointment as chairman to replace outgoing chairman S. Dhanabalan.

Lim was also appointed as the chairman of NTUC Enterprise Co-operative in 2012.

Lim served as the deputy chairman of the Singapore Labour Foundation.

In 2017, Lim urged Singaporeans to work as long as they can, as working longer can offer health benefits and give them a sense of purpose.

"We should work for as long as we are able to work, and want to work, although we should not expect the same pay."

On 6 June 2025, Temasek Holdings announces that Lim will step down from his chairman role on 9 October with Teo Chee Hean as his successor.

On 30 October, Lim retired from his role as chairman of NTUC Enterprise Co-operative, with Tan Hee Teck as his successor, citing that he takes 'ultimate responsibility' for failed Income-Allianz deal.

== Honours ==
In August 1996, Lim was conferred the honorary Doctor of Business from the Royal Melbourne Institute of Technology for his role in developing and fostering tripartite relationship among government, employers and workers in Singapore.

In November, Lim received the honorary Doctorate of Civil Law from his alma mater, the University of Newcastle Upon Tyne for his "combined academic distinction, business acumen, political commitment and social concern".

== Notes ==
Political offices
Preceded by ?	Senior Minister of State (Trade & Industry); 1991 - 1993	Succeeded by ?
Preceded by ?	Second Minister For Trade & Industry; 1993	Succeeded by ?
Preceded by Post created	Minister, Without Portfolio; 1993 – 2001	Succeeded by himself (Post Renamed as Minister in the Prime Minister's Office)
Preceded by himself (Post created from Minister, Without Portfolio	Minister in the Prime Minister's Office; 2001 - 2011	Succeeded by Lim Swee Say and S. Iswaran
Party political offices
Preceded by Tony Tan	Chairman, People's Action Party; 2004 - 2011	Succeeded by Khaw Boon Wan
Trade union offices
Preceded by Ong Teng Cheong	Secretary-General, National Trades Union Congress; 1993 - 2006	Succeeded by Lim Swee Say
