= Cassandra Lee (politician) =

Singaporean politician

The Honourable Cassandra Lee
- 吕思憓
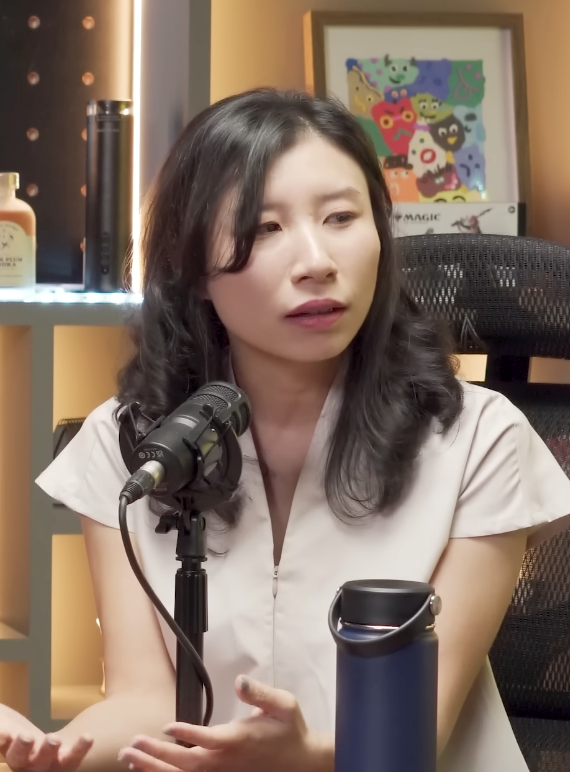
- Lee in 2025

Member of the Singapore Parliament for West Coast–Jurong West GRC
- Incumbent
- Assumed office 3 May 2025
- Preceded by: Constituency established
- Majority: 29,509 (19.98%)

Personal details
- Born: Cassandra Lee Shi Wee; 1991 or 1992 (age 34–35)
- Party: People's Action Party
- Education: National University of Singapore
- Occupation: Politician; lawyer

Cassandra Lee Shi Wee (Note: Chinese: 吕思憓; pinyin: Lǚ Sīhuì) is a Singaporean politician and lawyer. A member of the governing People's Action Party (PAP), she has been the Member of Parliament (MP) for the Ayer Rajah division of West Coast–Jurong West Group Representation Constituency (GRC) since 2025.

== Education ==
Lee graduated from the National University of Singapore (NUS) with honours degrees in law and economics.

== Career ==
Lee is a lawyer. She first worked for Enterprise Singapore, a statutory board, serving on its negotiation team for free trade agreements and as a representative for Singapore at ASEAN and APEC. She subsequently worked in the Attorney General’s Chambers (AGC) as a state counsel and deputy public prosecutor. She is currently an assistant director at the legal counsel of EY Singapore, which she joined in 2023.

=== Political career ===
Lee began volunteering with the PAP in 2009 at the party's Yuhua branch. In that capacity, she led schemes to support young parents in their balance of work and caregiving, as well as improve barrier-free access for the elderly.

In the lead-up to the 2025 general election, Lee and David Hoe joined Jurong–Clementi Town Council as volunteers, signalling that they would likely be fielded in Jurong East–Bukit Batok GRC, which had been created to replace the defunct Jurong GRC. However, she was instead fielded in West Coast–Jurong West GRC, having been absent from the PAP team for Jurong East–Bukit Batok GRC when it was officially introduced.

Lee became an MP for West Coast–Jurong West GRC after the PAP team defeated the Progress Singapore Party (PSP) with 59.99% of the vote.

Lee faced criticism following her maiden parliamentary speech on 24 September 2025, in which she stated that it was the "best time to start and raise a family" in Singapore. Her remarks were widely regarded as out of touch. Lee has served as the Vice-Chairman of the West Coast–Jurong West Town Council since 2025.

== Personal life ==
Lee is married and has a son. When she was 23, her father was diagnosed with cancer, which he subsequently died of.

== Notes ==
Parliament of Singapore
New constituency	Member of Parliament for West Coast–Jurong West GRC; 2025–present Served alongside: Desmond Lee, Ang Wei Neng, Hamid Razak, Shawn Huang	Incumbent
