= Jurong Central Single Member Constituency =

Electoral division in Singapore

Jurong Central
- Single-member constituency for the Parliament of Singapore
- Region: West Region, Singapore
- Electorate: 29,667

Current constituency
- Created: 2025; 1 year ago
- Seats: 1
- Party: People's Action Party
- Member: Xie Yao Quan
- Town Council: Jurong–Clementi–Bukit Batok
- Created from: Jurong GRC; Yuhua SMC

The Jurong Central Single Member Constituency (Note: Malay: Kawasan Undi Perseorangan Jurong Central; Chinese: 裕廊中单选区; Tamil: ஜூரோங் சென்ட்ரல் தனித்தொகுதியில்) is a single-member constituency (SMC) situated in western Singapore. It is managed by Jurong–Clementi–Bukit Batok Town Council (JRBBTC). The current Member of Parliament (MP) is Xie Yao Quan from the People's Action Party (PAP).

== History ==
Jurong Central SMC was created prior to the 2025 general election, having been split from Jurong Group Representation Constituency (GRC), the constituency with the best performance for the governing PAP during the 2015 and 2020 general elections. The SMC was officially created to ensure that the newly created Jurong East–Bukit Batok GRC (which itself was created from the split of Jurong GRC) remained represented by five MPs. At creation, Jurong Central SMC had a total of 29,620 registered voters, with 25,668 from Jurong GRC and the remaining from Yuhua SMC.

The PAP fielded Xie, the incumbent MP for the Jurong Central division in Jurong GRC, to stand for reelection in the SMC. He defeated Kala Manickam from Red Dot United (RDU) with 80.51% of the vote.

== Member of Parliament ==
Interactive map of Jurong Central SMC as of the 2025 general election

Year	Member	Party
Formation
2025	Xie Yao Quan	PAP

== Electoral results ==
Note: The Elections Department does not include rejected votes when calculating the vote shares of candidates. Hence, all candidates' vote shares will total to 100% at any given election (may not appear so in multi-way contests due to rounding).

=== Elections in 2020s ===
General Election 2025
Party	Candidate	Votes	%
PAP	Xie Yao Quan	21,947	80.51
RDU	Kala Manickam	5,313	19.49
Majority		16,634	61.02
Total valid votes		27,260	98.09
Rejected ballots		531	1.91
Turnout		27,791	93.68
Registered electors		29,667	
PAP win (new seat)			
