= Jurong Group Representation Constituency =

Former constituency in Singapore

Jurong
- Former group representation constituency for the Parliament of Singapore
- Region: West Region, Singapore
- Electorate: 131,058

Former constituency
- Created: 2001; 25 years ago
- Abolished: 2025; 1 year ago
- Seats: 5
- Member: Constituency abolished
- Town Council: Jurong–Clementi
- Created from: Bukit Gombak SMC; Bukit Timah GRC; Hong Kah GRC
- Replaced by: Holland–Bukit Timah GRC (Bukit Timah Hill District); Jurong Central SMC; Jurong East–Bukit Batok GRC (Bukit Batok East, Clementi); West Coast–Jurong West GRC (Jurong Spring, Taman Jurong)

The Jurong Group Representation Constituency was a five-member group representation constituency (GRC) in western Singapore. At abolition, it had five divisions: Bukit Batok East, Clementi, Jurong Central, Jurong Spring and Taman Jurong, managed by Jurong–Clementi Town Council.

== History ==
=== 2001–2011: Creation and first three elections ===
Jurong GRC was created prior to the 2001 general election with five seats in Parliament. It comprised the majority of the defunct Bukit Timah GRC, as well as parts of Hong Kah GRC and the defunct Bukit Gombak Single Member Constituency (SMC). The governing People's Action Party (PAP) defeated the Singapore Democratic Party (SDP) with 79.75% of the vote.

During the 2006 general election, the PAP team for Jurong GRC won unopposed. During the 2011 general election, it defeated the National Solidarity Party (NSP) with 66.96% of the vote.

==== 2008: Death of Ong Chit Chung ====
In 2008, incumbent MP Ong Chit Chung died of heart cancer. A by-election was not called to fill his vacated seat. Ong's death led to Nominated MPs Thio Li-ann and Loo Choon Yong to file a motion to update the electoral system to have a compulsory by-election if the vacated seat is held by a minority MP in the GRC, half or more elected GRC members vacated their seats, or the MP of a SMC vacated their seat. Prime Minister Lee Hsien Loong rejected the motion, saying "The vacancy does not affect the mandate of the government, nor its ability to deliver on its programmes and promises. The government's mandate continues to run until the next General Election is called, when the incumbent team will render account to the electorate."

=== 2015 general election ===
During the 2015 general election, Jurong GRC lost its Bukit Batok division, which became Bukit Batok SMC; in return, it absorbed the Clementi division of West Coast GRC, maintaining its five seats. Led by Tharman Shanmugaratnam, the PAP defeated Singaporeans First (SingFirst) with 79.29% of the vote.

=== 2020 general election ===
During the 2020 general election, Desmond Lee and Ang Wei Neng, both incumbents for Jurong GRC, were redeployed to West Coast GRC. Xie Yao Quan was nominated as a PAP candidate for the former constituency, replacing Ivan Lim, a general manager at Keppel, who had withdrawn 3 days after his electoral introduction. Lim had been accused online of past arrogance and elitism, as well as involvement in Keppel's then-active bribery case in Brazil. The PAP team included former fighter pilot Shawn Huang. Led again by Tharman, the PAP team for Jurong GRC defeated Red Dot United (RDU), with 74.61% of the vote.

==== 2023: Resignation of Tharman Shanmugaratnam ====
In July 2023, to stand as a candidate in the presidential election in the same year, Tharman resigned from Parliament, his ministerial positions and the PAP.

=== 2025: Abolition ===
Jurong GRC was dissolved prior to the 2025 general election. 2,776 voters were absorbed into Holland–Bukit Timah GRC; the remaining majority of the electorate was split between Jurong East–Bukit Batok GRC, Jurong Central SMC, and West Coast–Jurong West GRC.

== Members of Parliament ==
Year	Division	Members of Parliament	Party
Formation
2001	Bukit Batok; Bukit Batok East; Jurong Central; Taman Jurong; Yuhua	Ong Chit Chung; Halimah Yacob; Lim Boon Heng; Tharman Shanmugaratnam; Yu-Foo Yee Shoon	PAP
2006	Bukit Batok; Bukit Batok East; Jurong Central; Taman Jurong; Yuhua	Ong Chit Chung (2006–2008)^{1}; Halimah Yacob; Lim Boon Heng; Tharman Shanmugaratnam; Grace Fu	PAP
2011	Bukit Batok; Bukit Batok East; Jurong Central; Jurong Spring; Taman Jurong	David Ong; Halimah Yacob; Ang Wei Neng; Desmond Lee; Tharman Shanmugaratnam	PAP
2015	Bukit Batok East; Clementi; Jurong Central; Jurong Spring; Taman Jurong	Rahayu Mahzam; Tan Wu Meng; Ang Wei Neng; Desmond Lee; Tharman Shanmugaratnam	PAP
2020	Bukit Batok East; Clementi; Jurong Central; Jurong Spring / Bukit Timah Hill District; Taman Jurong	Rahayu Mahzam; Tan Wu Meng; Xie Yao Quan; Shawn Huang; Tharman Shanmugaratnam (2020–2023)^{2}	PAP
Constituency abolished (2025)

== Electoral results ==
Note: The Elections Department does not include rejected votes when calculating the vote shares of candidates. Hence, all candidates' vote shares will total to 100% at any given election (may not appear so in multi-way contests due to rounding).

=== Elections in 2000s ===
General Election 2001
Party	Candidate	Votes	%
PAP	Halimah Yacob Ong Chit Chung Lim Boon Heng Tharman Shanmugaratnam Yu-Foo Yee Shoon	84,472	79.75
SDP	Chee Soon Juan Chee Siok Chin Gandhi s/o Karuppiah Ambalam Mohamed Isa Bin Abdul Aziz Vincent Yeo	21,511	20.25
Majority		62,961	59.50
Total valid votes		106,253	97.30
Rejected ballots		2,945	2.70
Turnout		109,198	94.86
Registered electors		115,113	
PAP win (new seat)			

General Election 2006
Party	Candidate	Votes	%	±%
PAP	Grace Fu; Halimah Yacob; Ong Chit Chung; Lim Boon Heng; Tharman Shanmugaratnam	Unopposed		
Registered electors		116,573		▲1.27
PAP hold				

=== Elections in 2010s ===
General Election 2011
Party	Candidate	Votes	%	±%
PAP	Ang Wei Neng David Ong Desmond Lee Halimah Yacob Tharman Shanmugaratnam	76,595	66.96	N/A
NSP	Abdul Rasheed Cristopher Neo Elvin Ong Noraini Yunus Ong Hock Siong	37,786	33.04	N/A
Majority		38,809	33.92	N/A
Total valid votes		114,381	97.69	N/A
Rejected ballots		2,706	2.31	N/A
Turnout		117,087	93.46	N/A
Registered electors		125,276		▲7.47
PAP hold		Swing	N/A	

General Election 2015
Party	Candidate	Votes	%	±%
PAP	Ang Wei Neng Desmond Lee Rahayu Mahzam Tan Wu Meng Tharman Shanmugaratnam	95,228	79.29	▲12.33
SingFirst	David Foo Ming Jin Sukdeu Singh Tan Peng Ann Wong Chee Wai Wong Soon Hong	24,869	20.71	N/A
Majority		70,359	58.58	▲24.66
Total valid votes		120,097	98.01	▲0.32
Rejected ballots		2,436	1.99	▼0.32
Turnout		122,533	93.90	▲0.44
Registered electors		130,498		▲4.17
PAP hold		Swing	▲12.33	

=== Elections in 2020s ===
General Election 2020
Party	Candidate	Votes	%	±%
PAP	Rahayu Mahzam Shawn Huang Tan Wu Meng Tharman Shanmugaratnam Xie Yao Quan	91,846	74.61	▼4.67
RDU	Alec Tok Liyana Dhamirah Michelle Lee Juen Nicholas Tang Ravi Philemon	31,260	25.39	N/A
Majority		60,586	49.22	▼9.36
Total valid votes		123,106	97.99	▼0.02
Rejected ballots		2,519	2.01	▲0.02
Turnout		125,625	95.85	▲1.95
Registered electors		131,058		▲0.43
PAP hold		Swing	▼4.67	
