= West Coast–Jurong West Group Representation Constituency =

Electoral division in Singapore

West Coast–Jurong West
- Group Representation constituency for the Parliament of Singapore
- Region: West Region, Singapore
- Electorate: 158,836

Current constituency
- Created: 2025; 1 year ago
- Seats: 5
- Party: People's Action Party
- Members: Ang Wei Neng; Cassandra Lee; Desmond Lee; Hamid Razak; Shawn Huang
- Town Council: West Coast–Jurong West
- Created from: Jurong GRC (Jurong Spring, Taman Jurong); West Coast GRC

The West Coast–Jurong West Group Representation Constituency is a five-member group representation constituency (GRC) in the western region of Singapore. It has six divisions: Ayer Rajah, Boon Lay, Nanyang, Jurong Spring–Gek Poh, Taman Jurong, and West Coast, (Note: Jointly overseen by two MPs, Desmond Lee (also MP for Boon Lay) and Cassandra Lee (also MP for Ayer Rajah).) managed by West Coast–Jurong West Town Council. The current Members of Parliament (MPs) for the constituency are Ang Wei Neng, Cassandra Lee, Minister-in-charge of Social Service Integration and Minister of Education Desmond Lee, Hamid Razak and Shawn Huang from the governing People's Action Party (PAP).

== History ==
Prior to the 2025 general election, West Coast–Jurong West GRC was created after West Coast GRC, which had absorbed the Jurong Spring and Taman Jurong divisions of Jurong GRC, was renamed. In the process of redrawing, the defunct GRC had its estates in Telok Blangah and Dover shifted to Tanjong Pagar GRC, while its easternmost polling district, comprising estates in HarbourFront and on the offshore island of Sentosa, was shifted to Radin Mas Single Member Constituency (SMC).

The PAP stood for reelection with a team led by Desmond Lee against the reconfigured A-team of the Progress Singapore Party (PSP), which, having narrowly lost in West Coast GRC, had received both of the non-constituency MP (NCMP) seats offered after the 2020 general election. The PAP won an improved 59.99% of the vote in the new GRC; the PSP, in contrast, lost its NCMP seats.

== Members of Parliament ==
Divisions or wards of West Coast–Jurong West GRC as of the 2025 general election:
1 Ayer Rajah (includes Tuas and the Western Islands)
2 Boon Lay
3 Jurong Spring–Gek Poh
4 Nanyang
5 Taman Jurong
6 West Coast

Election	Divisions	Members of Parliament	Party
Formation
2025	Ayer Rajah; Boon Lay; Jurong Spring–Gek Poh; Nanyang; Taman Jurong; West Coast	Cassandra Lee; Desmond Lee; Hamid Razak; Ang Wei Neng; Shawn Huang	PAP

== Electoral results ==
Note: The Elections Department does not include rejected votes when calculating the vote shares of candidates. Hence, all candidates' vote shares will total to 100% at any given election (may not appear so in multi-way contests due to rounding).

=== Elections in 2020s ===
General Election 2025
Party	Candidate	Votes	%
PAP	Ang Wei Neng Cassandra Lee Desmond Lee Hamid Razak Shawn Huang	88,587	59.99
PSP	Hazel Poa Leong Mun Wai Sani Ismail Sumarleki Amjah Tan Cheng Bock	59,078	40.01
Majority		29,509	19.98
Total valid votes		147,665	99.04
Rejected ballots		1,438	0.96
Turnout		149,103	93.87
Registered electors		158,836	
PAP win (new seat)			
