= Tan Wu Meng =

Singaporean politician

- 陈有明
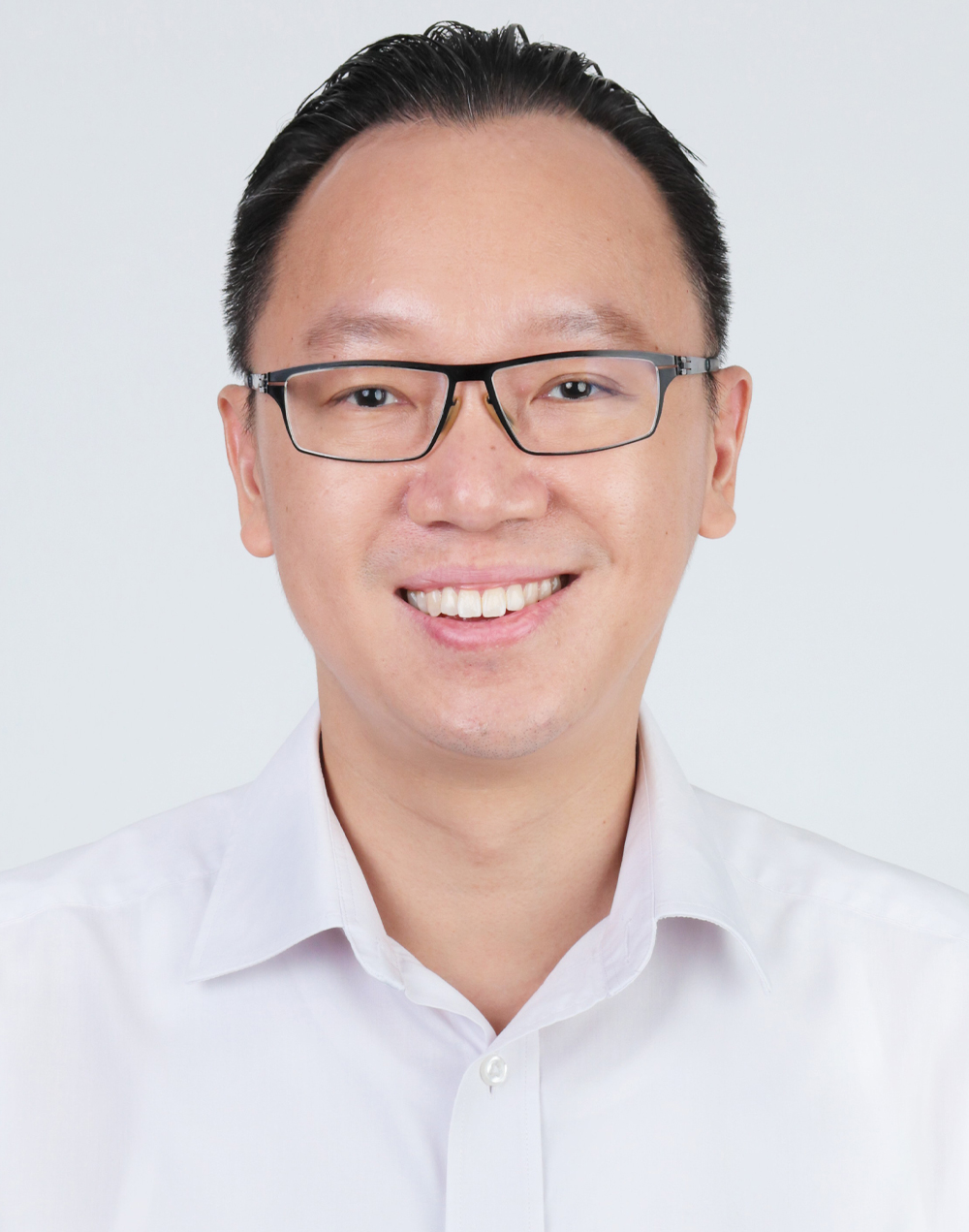
- Official portrait, 2021

Senior Parliamentary Secretary for Foreign Affairs
- In office 1 May 2018 – 26 July 2020
- Minister: Vivian Balakrishnan

Senior Parliamentary Secretary for Trade and Industry
- In office 1 May 2018 – 26 July 2020
- Minister: Chan Chun Sing

Member of Parliament for Jurong GRC
- In office 11 September 2015 – 15 April 2025
- Preceded by: Arthur Fong
- Succeeded by: Constituency abolished

Personal details
- Born: 1975 (age 50–51) Singapore
- Party: People's Action Party
- Children: 2
- Education: Trinity College, Cambridge; National University of Singapore
- Occupation: Politician; oncologist

Tan Wu Meng (Chinese: 陈有明; pinyin: Chén Yǒumíng; born 1975) is a Singaporean oncologist and retired politician who served as Senior Parliamentary Secretary for Foreign Affairs and Senior Parliamentary Secretary for Trade and Industry concurrently between 2018 and 2020. A member of the governing People's Action Party (PAP), he was the Member of Parliament (MP) as part of the team representing Jurong Group Representation Constituency from 2015 to 2025.

== Education ==
Tan was educated at Raffles Institution and Hwa Chong Junior College before he went to the University of Cambridge, where he studied medicine at Trinity College. He was the recipient of an A*STAR International Fellowship and a Cambridge MB BS-PhD programme scholarship, allowing him to train as a doctor and complete a research doctorate at the Medical Research Council Laboratory of Molecular Biology. Tan also holds a Master of Medicine in internal medicine from the National University of Singapore and a Fellowship of the Academy of Medicine, Singapore, in medical oncology.

While at university, Tan was the President of the Cambridge Union Society in 2001. He represented Cambridge as a debater, reaching the Grand Final of the World Universities Debating Championships in Stellenbosch in 2003 where he was ranked the Best Individual Speaker of the tournament.

== Career ==
Tan began his medical career as a specialist in medical oncology at the National Cancer Centre at the Singapore General Hospital. He served as the Director of Outpatient Care for the Division of Medical Oncology. He was also a Pro-Tem Committee Member for the Sengkang Hospital Project and a member of the SingHealth Specialist Outpatient Clinic Task Force. He was a member of the Executive Committee of the Singapore Society of Oncology from 2012 to 2014.

=== Political career ===
From 2006 to 2009, Tan served with the North West Community Development Council as a Councillor and Vice-Chair of the Youth Works Sub-Committee. He was a member of the Senja-Cashew Youth Executive Committee 2007 to 2011 and also sat on the Senja-Cashew Citizens' Consultative Committee from 2010 to 2013.

In 2008, at the age of 33, Tan was elected the Organising Secretary of the PAP's youth wing, the Young PAP. He was the first person to hold the role of elected Young PAP Organising Secretary after it was created and served in the role until 2010.

During the 2015 general election, Tan was a member of the People's Action Party (PAP) team contesting in Jurong GRC. Tan was elected to Parliament when the five-member PAP team in Jurong GRC defeated the SingFirst team by 95,080 votes (79.3%) to 24,848 (20.7%).

Tan served as a backbencher in Parliament until May 2018 when he was appointed as a Senior Parliamentary Secretary to the Ministry of Foreign Affairs and Ministry of Trade and Industry.

Tan was re-elected as an MP for Jurong GRC at the 2020 general election. Following the election, it was announced that Tan would be standing down from the role of Parliamentary Secretary and would continue to serve in Parliament as a backbencher. He was then appointed Chair of the Government Parliamentary Committee (GPC) for Health in the 14th Parliament.

During the 2025 election, Tan stood down from politics and did not contest the election.

== Personal life ==
Tan's wife is an infectious diseases doctor. The couple have two daughters, born in 2011 and 2017.

Parliament of Singapore
Preceded by Arthur Fong as MP for West Coast GRC (Clementi)	Member of Parliament for Jurong GRC (Clementi); 2015 – 2025	Succeeded by David Hoe as MP for Jurong East–Bukit Batok GRC (Clementi)
