= Substitute (elections) =

A substitute is a political candidate who is not directly elected, but who succeeds a politician holding an elected office after that person ceases to hold the office due to, for example, resignation or death. This system can be used to fill casual vacancies instead of holding by-elections or special elections to fill the vacant office. Substitutes are nominated, not at the time the vacancy arises but, rather, before the election for the information of voters. In voting systems which use electoral lists, the candidates on a given list who are not among those initially elected may become the substitutes for those who are. In other systems, individual candidates may have substitutes.

== Belgium ==
In Belgian federal parliamentary elections, each electoral list has both a list of "effective" candidates and a list of "substitutes" (Dutch: opvolgers; French: suppléants). The system was introduced as part of the law of 29 December 1899 introducing proportional representation. Before that, by-elections were held to succeed members.

For municipal and provincial elections, as well as those for the Parliament of the Brussels-Capital Region since 2019, there is only one list, and substitutes are designated, according to various systems from one region to another, on the basis of their own preferential votes, weighted or not with list votes, i.e. not for one or several specific candidate(s).

== France ==
In the elections for the French National Assembly, each candidate is on a ticket with a substitute (French: Suppléant), who assumes the functions of the elected deputy under specific conditions. The substitute assumes the functions of the deputy if the deputy dies, enters the executive government, is appointed by the Government to an assignment of more than six months' duration, or is appointed to the Constitutional Council or Defender of Rights (Défenseur des droits).

If the deputy resigns, or their election is determined to be invalid, a by-election (French: élections legislatives partielles) is held instead.

The Electoral Code does not provide for any age restriction to be appointed alternate. For the Fourteenth Legislature (2012 - 2017), the youngest Deputy-Substitute in France was Nicolas Brien, born in 1989, who was elected in Allier's 2nd constituency.

=== Examples ===
2017

- Élise Fajgeles replaced Benjamin Griveaux when he was appointed Secretary of State to the Minister of the Economy and Finance on 22 July 2017.
- Grégory Galbadon replaced Stéphane Travert when he was appointed Minister of Agriculture on 22 July 2017.

2018

- Jean-Louis Thiériot replaced Yves Jégo in Seine-et-Marne's 3rd constituency.

2019

- Stéphanie Atger replaced Amélie de Montchalin when she was appointed Minister of Europe and Foreign Affairs.

2020

- Sandra Boëlle replaced Claude Goasguen in Paris's 14th constituency when he died.
- Nicolas Meizonnet replaced Gilbert Collard in Gard's 2nd constituency when he was elected to the European Parliament.

2021

- Maud Gatel replaced Marielle de Sarnez in Paris's 11th constituency when she died

2025

- Christelle Minard replaced Olivier Marleix upon his suicide.

== Philippines ==
In the Philippines, a substitute is a person who replaces the candidate up to midday of election day. The Commission on Elections only allows substitution for certain reasons and on certain periods, if the original candidate dies, withdraws or is disqualified; after a certain date, substitution via withdrawal is prohibited, and a candidate can only be substituted by someone who has the same surname as the original candidate. Furthermore, only candidates who were nominated by a political party can be substituted.

If a vacancy occurs after the term of office begins, substitutes do not replace the original candidate:

- For executive offices (president, governor, mayor), the deputy (vice president, vice governor, vice mayor, as the case may be) replaces the original officeholder
- For the vice president, the president nominates a new officeholder, which is then confirmed by Congress.
- For members of Congress, a special election (called as "by-elections" elsewhere) is held, except for members elected under the party-list system, where the next person on the list takes their place.
- For deputies of local executive offices (vice governor, vice mayor), the candidate with the highest number of votes in the local legislature (Sangguniang Panlalawigan and Sangguniang Panlungsod or Sangguniang Bayan, as the case may be) replaces the original officeholder
- For members of local legislatures, the political party nominates a new officeholder; if the vacating officeholder is an independent, the chief executive (president, governor, mayor, as the case may be) appoints a replacement.

=== Examples ===
- Magnolia Antonino substituted for her husband Gaudencio Antonino in the 1967 Philippine Senate election after the latter died on election eve. Magnolia eventually won.
- Edna Sanchez substituted for her husband Armando Sanchez in 2010 Batangas gubernatorial election after the latter died. Edna eventually lost.
- Rodrigo Duterte substituted for Martin Diño in the 2016 Philippine presidential election after the latter withdrew. Duterte eventually won.
- Sara Duterte substituted for Lyle Fernando Uy in the 2022 Philippine vice presidential election after the latter withdrew. Duterte eventually won.
- Bong Go substituted for Grepor Belgica in the 2022 Philippine presidential election after the latter withdrew. Go eventually withdrew himself.

== Singapore ==
In Singapore, substitutes of candidates occasionally occurs where candidates either withdrew prior to the nomination day of the election, but in terms on Group Representation Constituency (GRC), a team must comply ethnic minority requirements by constitution. Such cases of substitutions occurred within the following years:

- In the 2011 election, Tanjong Pagar GRC People's Action Party (PAP) MP Baey Yam Keng was moved to Tampines GRC after potential candidate Steve Tan Peng Hoe withdrew hours prior to nomination day, citing allegations against his former colleagues. The PAP found its standby candidate Chia Shi-Lu as its substitute for Baey on time. However, Chia and his Tanjong Pagar GRC was elected via walkover.. According to a statement by then-Defence Minister Ng Eng Hen, who oversees the process of candidate recruitment, he told on media that PAP had four substitutes in that election and Chia was among the first in-line for its substitution.
- In the 2015 election, Ang Mo Kio GRC MP Yeo Guat Kwang substituted Serangoon division representative Chan Hui Yuh as part of the five-member Aljunied GRC PAP team, as she withdrew due to her personal reasons. Chan would later make her debut in the 2020 election.
- In the 2020 election, Ivan Lim was originally fielded to Jurong GRC, but Lim shortly withdrew from the contest just three days later amid online backlash and controversies surrounding personal life and his behaviour and conduct as a military officer. PAP shortly announced Xie Yao Quan as Lim's replacement, while also announced that they would defer handling Lim's matter until the elections conclude. As in the 2011's case, then-Senior Minister Tharman Shanmugaratnam, who was anchoring Jurong GRC, told on media that PAP has more than enough reserve substitutions in situations like these being occurred. Similarly, then-Deputy Prime Minister Heng Swee Keat, then the MP of Tampines GRC, made an eleventh-hour substitution during nomination day on contesting East Coast GRC after its incumbent Lim Swee Say retired, to fend off a fierce challenge against the WP.

If a vacancy occurs after the term of office begins, substitutes do not immediately replace the original candidate in case of GRCs, where under constitution a by-election may be called only when an entire team of MPs had vacated their seats. Calling by-elections does not impose a required time limit within which a by-election had to be called, although Article 49(1) does not specify the time limit, and it is the Prime Minister's discretion on deciding on doing so. In cases of GRCs, MPs who fell vacant may be substituted by fellow neigbouring MPs from the same GRCs while a second grassroots advisor (in the case of PAP team) may be substituted for the grassroots activities.

- The most recent case occurred on 20 July 2026, where Marine Parade-Braddell Heights GRC MP Muhammad Faishal Ibrahim resigned from the seat amid misconduct in handling communication against a member of public. The PAP announced that the four MPs for said GRCs will act as interim MPs for Faishal's Kembangan division, and on 28 August, the PAP announced Firdaus Daud as its replacement in the grassroots management for Kembangan.
- The most recent case for an opposition party MP occurred on 19 July 2023 where a video showing intimate actions between Aljunied GRC MP Leon Perera and WP member Nicole Seah surfaced online; both people subsequently resigned from the party afterwards. WP announced that the remaining four MPs of Aljunied GRC would act as interim MPs for Perera's Serangoon division. As because Aljunied is an opposition-held ward, the grassroots advisor was not replaced. Perera was later succeeded by Kenneth Tiong in 2025.
- Two days before Perera's case surfaced, on 17 July 2023, two seats held by the PAP fell vacant due to an extramarital affair between Marine Parade GRC MP and Speaker Tan Chuan-Jin and Tampines GRC MP Cheng Li Hui. As with Faishal and Perera's resignation, both divisions were overseen by their respective GRC MPs on interim, while its grassroots advisors were replaced by eventual MPs Choo Pei Ling and Charlene Chen, respectively.
- The recent by-election was called in 2016 following former PAP Bukit Batok SMC MP David Ong resigned amidst revelations of an extramarital affair against a grassroots volunteer. Between the time of resignation until the by-election, fellow Jurong GRC MP and Senior Minister of State Desmond Lee acted as interim MP for Bukit Batok. Ong was succeeded by Murali Pillai, who was also a former branch secretary for Bukit Batok prior to his 2015 debut, after the by-election.

== United States of America ==
Until the 20th century, the Vice President was mostly a substitute for the President.

=== Examples ===
- Andrew Johnson replaced Abraham Lincoln after his assassination.
- Harry Truman replaced Franklin Roosevelt after his death.
