= List of Singaporean Community Development Councils (2011–2015) =

The following is a list of Singaporean Community Development Councils from 2011 to 2015.

As of 2011, there are still five Community Development Councils throughout Singapore. However, the composition of constituencies within each CDC were changed on 27 May 2011 to reflect the changes in constituencies during the 2011 Singaporean general election.

Community Development Council	Constituencies	Electorate (2011)	
Community Development Council	Constituencies	Constituency	CDC
Central Singapore	Ang Mo Kio GRC	179,071	608,456
Central Singapore	Bishan–Toa Payoh GRC	122,492	608,456
Central Singapore	Moulmein–Kallang GRC	87,595	608,456
Central Singapore	Tanjong Pagar GRC	139,771	608,456
Central Singapore	Radin Mas SMC	31,014	608,456
Central Singapore	Sengkang West SMC	26,882	608,456
Central Singapore	Whampoa SMC	21,631	608,456
North East	Aljunied GRC	143,148	507,492
North East	Pasir Ris–Punggol GRC	168,971	507,492
North East	Tampines GRC	137,532	507,492
North East	Hougang SMC	24,560	507,492
North East	Punggol East SMC	33,281	507,492
North West	Holland–Bukit Timah GRC	91,607	415,409
North West	Nee Soon GRC	148,290	415,409
North West	Sembawang GRC	142,459	415,409
North West	Bukit Panjang SMC	33,053	415,409
South East	East Coast GRC	120,324	337,902
South East	Marine Parade GRC	154,451	337,902
South East	Joo Chiat SMC	22,069	337,902
South East	Mountbatten SMC	23,731	337,902
South East	Potong Pasir SMC	17,327	337,902
South West	Chua Chu Kang GRC	158,648	481,614
South West	Jurong GRC	125,276	481,614
South West	West Coast GRC	121,045	481,614
South West	Hong Kah North SMC	27,701	481,614
South West	Pioneer SMC	25,745	481,614
South West	Yuhua SMC	23,199	481,614
