= 2015 Singaporean general election =

- 11 September 2015

All 89 directly elected seats in Parliament (and up to 9 NCMPs)
- Registered: 2,462,926
- Turnout: 93.70% (▲0.52pp)
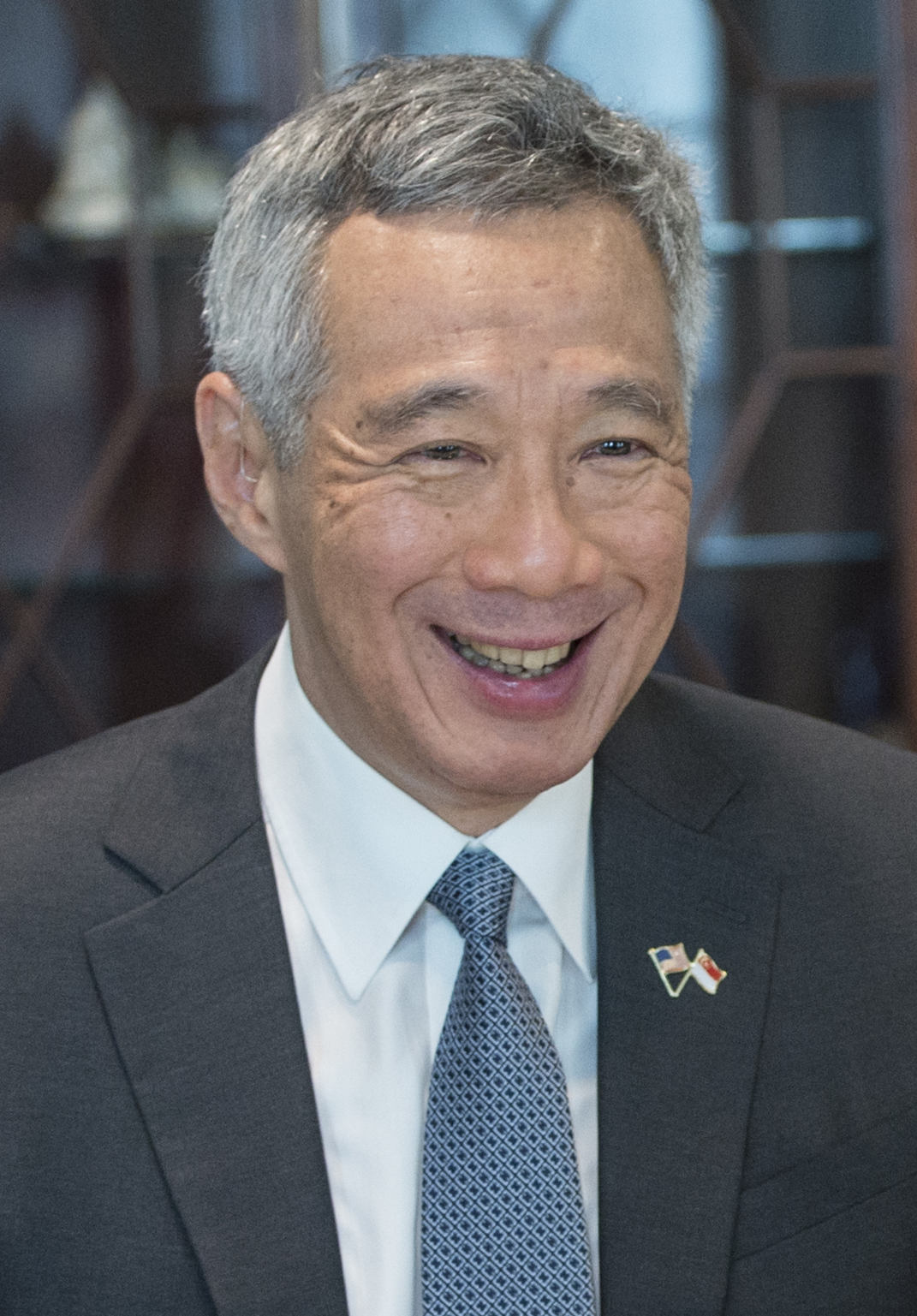

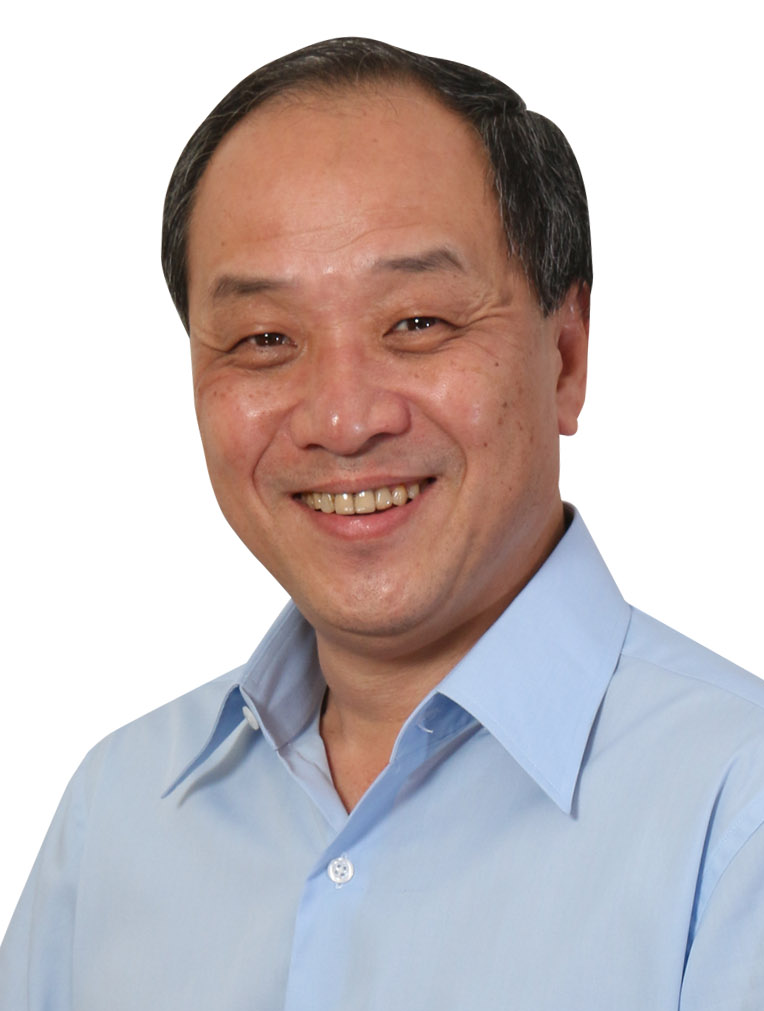
	First party	Second party
Leader	Lee Hsien Loong	Low Thia Khiang
Party	PAP	WP
Leader's seat	Ang Mo Kio GRC	Aljunied GRC
Last election	60.14%, 81 seats	12.83%, 8 seats
Seats won	83	9
Seat change	▲2	▲1
Popular vote	1,579,183	282,143
Percentage	69.86%	12.48%
Swing	▲9.72pp	▼0.35pp
- Results by constituency
Prime Minister before election
Lee Hsien Loong
PAP
Prime Minister after election
Lee Hsien Loong
PAP

General elections were held in Singapore on 11 September 2015 to elect members of Parliament. They were the fourteenth general elections since the introduction of self-government in 1959 and the twelfth since independence in 1965. President Tony Tan dissolved parliament on 25 August on the advice of Prime Minister Lee Hsien Loong three weeks before the election. The number of elected seats was increased from 87 to 89 from the previous election. This was the third election contested by Lee as prime minister.

The elections were held a few months after the death of Lee Kuan Yew in March, who was a founding father of the country and a key figure in its development as a nation. His passing was widely seen as strengthening public support for the governing People's Action Party (PAP) as the national mood of remembrance and unity grew. The government also focused heavily on SG50 celebrations, which marked Singapore's golden jubilee of independence and stirred strong feelings of patriotism. Lee called a snap election by dissolving the 12th Parliament a year earlier than the intended October 2016 timeline, thus making it the shortest term since the 7th Parliament (1989–1991).

For the first time since 1963, and its first in post-independence Singapore in particular, all constituencies were contested and no PAP MPs were elected via walkovers, especially its first contest in Tanjong Pagar GRC, the only uncontested walkover in the last election. The PAP achieved a landslide victory in the election, retaining its supermajority and increasing its popular vote share by almost 10 percentage points to 69.86%, its best result since 2001. The party won 83 seats while the opposition Workers' Party (WP) won six, retaining Aljunied Group Representation Constituency (GRC) and Hougang Single Member Constituency (SMC) with reduced majorities. The WP's overall vote share fell by about 7% across the 28 seats it contested. Three non-constituency seats (NCMPs) were also allocated to the WP, resulting in the 13th Parliament being the first in which only two political parties were represented, whether through elected MPs or NCMPs.

== Background ==
The maximum term of a Singaporean parliament is five years, within which it must be dissolved by the President and elections held within three months, as stated in the Constitution. As like the previous elections since 1959, voting is compulsory and results are based on the first-past-the-post system. Elections are conducted by the Elections Department, which is under the jurisdiction of the Prime Minister's Office.

During the previous general election in 2011, the governing People's Action Party (PAP) had secured their 13th consecutive term in office since 1959. This was the PAP's third election with Lee Hsien Loong as its Secretary-General, and the country's first election after the death of its founding Prime Minister Lee Kuan Yew. Prior to the election, some analysts suggested that an early election to garner "sympathy votes" might backfire.

The Returning Officer for this election was the chief executive director of the Energy Market Authority, Ng Wai Choong.

=== Political parties ===
The governing People's Action Party (PAP) has been in power since 1959 and is currently led by the Prime Minister Lee Hsien Loong. The leading Opposition party is The Worker's Party, led by Low Thia Khiang, with seven elected seats and two NCMP seats. The Singapore People's Party led by Chiam See Tong has one NCMP seat. A total of eight Opposition parties challenged the ruling party in this election.

Party	Leader	Slogan	Votes in GE2011	Seats won	Remarks
People's Action Party	Lee Hsien Loong	"With You, For You, For Singapore"	60.14%	81 / 87	79 seats at time of dissolution.
Workers' Party	Low Thia Khiang	"Empower Your Future"	12.83%	6 / 87	Received two Non-constituency MPs. Seven seats at time of dissolution.
National Solidarity Party	Lim Tean	"Singaporeans Deserve Better"	12.04%	0 / 87	
Singapore Democratic Party	Chee Soon Juan	"Your Voice in Parliament"	4.83%	0 / 87	
Reform Party	Kenneth Jeyaretnam	"A Brighter Future Tomorrow, Today"	4.28%	0 / 87	
Singapore People's Party	Lina Loh	"We Hear You, We Speak For You"	3.11%	0 / 87	Including one Non-constituency MP.
Singapore Democratic Alliance	Desmond Lim Bak Chuan	"Singapore for Singaporeans"	2.78%	0 / 87	Alliance with Singapore Justice Party and Singapore Malay National Organisation parties.
People's Power Party	Goh Meng Seng	"Securing Our Future"	Did not exist		
Singaporeans First	Tan Jee Say	"Restore Our Nation"	Did not exist		

=== Electoral divisions ===
The Electoral Boundaries Review Committee is convened before every general election to review electoral boundaries in view of population growth and shifts. The committee is appointed by the prime minister.

	2011	2015
Seats	87	89
Electoral divisions	27	29
Group representation constituencies	15	16
Four-Member GRCs	2	6
Five-Member GRCs	11	8
Six-Member GRCs	2	2
Single member constituencies	12	13
Average GRC size	5.00	4.75
Voters	2,347,198	2,458,058
Voters (overseas votes inclusive)	2,350,873	2,462,926
Average electorate per seat	27,022	27,673

Singapore electoral boundaries, released in July 2015

The electoral boundaries were published on 24 July 2015, with about one-fifth of the existing electorate having redistricted to new constituencies. It comprises 13 Single Member Constituencies and 16 group representation constituencies, up by one of each, bringing the total number of seats to 89, up from 87 in the last general election.

Bishan–Toa Payoh GRC's boundaries were changed for the first time ever since the formation in 1997; the Moulmein–Kallang GRC, created in the last election, was removed in this election and revert back to its former original name of Jalan Besar GRC. A new four-seat Marsiling–Yew Tee GRC was created from the western portions of Woodlands and Yew Tee. Bukit Batok, Fengshan and MacPherson SMCs reappeared in the map for the first time since their last appearances in 1991, 1988 and 2006, respectively, while Joo Chiat and Whampoa SMCs were subsumed into their neigbouring GRCs. Hong Kah North and Sengkang West SMCs had boundary changes in that election. The remaining eight SMCs, as well as Aljunied and Tampines GRCs, were left intact.

The changes of the GRCs boundaries (and any SMCs, if applicable), were as follows:

Name of GRC	Changes
Ang Mo Kio GRC	Absorbed Punggol South division from Pasir Ris–Punggol GRC (renamed to Sengkang South) and Western portions of Fernvale from Sengkang West SMC; Carved out a majority of Kebun Baru division to Nee Soon GRC, while the Southern portion merged with Yio Chu Kang division
Bishan–Toa Payoh GRC	Absorbed northern portions of Moulmein division (Balestier, MacRitchie Reservoir and Novena) from Moulmein–Kallang GRC; Divisions for Bishan East, Toa Payoh East and Toa Payoh West were renamed Bishan East-Thomson, Toa Payoh East-Novena and Toa Payoh West-Balestier, respectively
Chua Chu Kang GRC	Ward downsized to four members Carved out eastern portions of Yew Tee division to Marsiling–Yew Tee GRC, while Lim Chu Kang and western portions of Yew Tee was transferred to Nanyang Division
East Coast GRC	Ward downsized to four members Carved out Fengshan division into SMC, and Coney Island to Pasir Ris–Punggol GRC
Holland–Bukit Timah GRC	Absorbed a portion of West Coast GRC and parts of Moulmein division (Adam Road) from Moulmein–Kallang GRC
Jalan Besar GRC	New Constituency; Formed from Moulmein–Kallang GRC (and a small portion of Moulmein division), Kreta Ayer–Kim Seng division from Tanjong Pagar GRC, and Whampoa SMC; Merged Jalan Besar division into Kampong Glam division.
Jurong GRC	Absorbed Clementi division from West Coast GRC; Carved out Bukit Batok division into SMC
Marine Parade GRC	Absorbed Joo Chiat SMC; Carved out MacPherson division into SMC
Marsiling–Yew Tee GRC	New Constituency; Formed with Yew Tee division (and carving out Limbang division) from Chua Chu Kang GRC, and Marsiling and Woodgrove divisions from Sembawang GRC
Nee Soon GRC	Absorbed Kebun Baru division from Ang Mo Kio GRC; Carved out Canberra and eastern and northern Yishun portions to Sembawang GRC
Pasir Ris–Punggol GRC	Carved out Punggol South division to Ang Mo Kio GRC; Northern portions of Punggol North and Punggol West were carved to form Punggol Coast division
Sembawang GRC	Absorbed Canberra division and portions of Chong Pang, Nee Soon East and Nee Soon South divisions from Nee Soon GRC (forming Gambas division); Carved out Marsiling and Woodgrove divisions to Marsiling–Yew Tee GRC
Tanjong Pagar GRC	Absorbed a majority of Moulmein division from Moulmein–Kallang GRC; Carved out Kreta Ayer–Kim Seng division to Jalan Besar GRC
West Coast GRC	Ward downsized to four members Carved out Clementi division (and Faber private estate from Ayer Rajah division) to Jurong GRC

== Political developments ==
Following the preceding election, a presidential election was held three months after the parliamentary election. Former Deputy Prime Minister Tony Tan narrowly won the election by a plurality against three other candidates, with Tan Cheng Bock, who would form the Progress Singapore Party in 2019, finishing second. Observers seen that both elections in 2011 were "watershed" due to the divide between the ruling People's Action Party and the oppositions, after the former party's support was waning at the time.

In the aftermath of the general election, both Minister Mentor Lee Kuan Yew and Senior Minister Goh Chok Tong stepped down from the cabinet and become backbenchers citing renewal process, with the latter being conferred as "emeritus"; as a result the Senior Minister post would be vacant until 2019. The four incumbents from the former PAP team for Aljunied GRC, including former Foreign Minister George Yeo and cabinet minister Lim Hwee Hua, subsequently retired from politics, and the former also declined to contest in that year's presidential election. Ong Ye Kung, a new fifth candidate who was also part of their PAP's Aljunied GRC team, was fielded instead to Sembawang GRC; Ang Mo Kio GRC incumbent Yeo Guat Kwang (whose ward was redrawn from Aljunied in 2011) replaced Ong as their lead.

Towards the end of the term, founding Prime Minister of Singapore and member-of-parliament for Tanjong Pagar GRC Lee Kuan Yew died of pneumonia on 23 March 2015, about 60 years after serving the constituency; then-Senior Minister of State Indranee Rajah acted as interim MP for Lee's Tanjong Pagar-Tiong Bahru division.

=== Opposition and extraparliamentary parties ===
Opposition parties had also seen several renewals, including Singapore Democratic Party where secretary-general Chee Soon Juan was formally discharged from bankruptcy by the court on 22 November 2012, rendering him eligible again to stand for elections for the first time since 2001. Former SDP members Tan Jee Say and Ang Yong Guan formed its new Singaporeans First party in May 2014.

The other party besides the leading opposition party of Workers' Party to represent in the 12th Parliament was Singapore People's Party, which consist of only Lina Loh as a Non-Constituency Member of Parliament. Secretary-general and Loh's spouse, Chiam See Tong, announced that he would not contest the election for the first time since his debut in 1976, citing health reasons. The party was further strengthened by Democratic Progressive Party with Mohamad Hamim bin Aliyas and Benjamin Pwee resigning from the latter party to join the former. This marked DPP's first electoral contest since 2001 after DPP became active again in December 2012 following a 10-year hiatus.

National Solidarity Party secretary-general Goh Meng Seng subsequently resigned from the party after the election, and formed its new People's Power Party early in 2015, with applications approved on July, nearly two months before the election. NSP had also met with several party changes including the introduction of Lim Tean who would later found Peoples Voice; while former NSP members such as Hazel Poa, Nicole Seah and Jeanette Chong-Aruldoss have left the party ahead of the election. However, NSP suffered a blunder on 19 August by making their controversial decision to contest MacPherson SMC after they initially decided not to challenge the ward; their proposed candidate, former Non-Constituency Member of Parliament Steve Chia, responded in protest that he would not contest this election after online outcry, and brought out reference about his nude photography scandal in December 2003, and commented that "the trolls have won". Their eventual candidate, former MP Cheo Chai Chen, was criticized during campaigning on 3 September through a Facebook post citing PAP candidate Tin Pei Ling's role as a mother (who she gave birth to her first child on 5 August) as a weakness and later claimed as a joke.

=== Events in Singapore ===
The parliament had responded to the signals of the electorate and tweaked its policies to cool escalating housing prices, enhance transport services, reward the nation's elderly pioneers and impose a significant cut to the salaries of certain office-holders. 2013 had also met with several incidents, most notably the 2013 Southeast Asian haze, the Population White Paper, the 2013 Little India riots, and controversies surrounding Aljunied-Hougang Town Council. 2014 also saw certain policy changes and certain debates addressing concerns for immigration, Central Provident Fund and retirement, its LGBT rights in Singapore, and its impact in its culture after three books are pulled from its shelves and destroyed according to National Library Board. All of these events became general topics that were discussed during the hustings.

=== By-elections in Singapore ===
A series of two by-elections within eight months were held during the term, marking it the first occurrence of such since 1992, with both involving a member-of-parliament vacating in their respective SMCs in 2012 pertaining to extramarital affairs. On February 14, Hougang SMC MP Yaw Shin Leong was also expelled from the Workers' Party following the party's CEC decision to expel him on misconduct. Ten months later on December 12, Punggol East SMC PAP MP and Speaker of the Parliament of Singapore Michael Palmer resigned from all the posts and the party.

In both of the ensuing by-elections, the WP candidates, Png Eng Huat and Lee Li Lian, respectively won both the May and January by-elections, the latter also resulted in the first time since the 1981 Anson by-election where PAP lost a seat during the term. In a follow-up statement by Prime Minister Lee Hsien Loong, he respected the results for both by-elections and encouraged alternative voices.

Following the success of both by-elections, WP announced that both Lee and Png, alongside the entire Aljunied GRC team, would remain in their respective constituencies this election.

=== Battleground constituencies ===
As with preceding elections, many media outlets named the following constituencies as its "hotspots" for the election:

- Aljunied GRC: the first GRC to be won by any opposition party in the last general election. The PAP team would be led by Yeo Guat Kwang and was backed by fellow PAP stalwarts such as Lim Boon Heng, claiming it as they are "no suicide squad". Serangoon division representative Chan Hui Yuh, however, did not participate in that election.
- Bishan-Toa Payoh GRC and Potong Pasir SMC: both contested by the SPP, with the latter being unseated by the PAP with a narrow 1% margin resulting in Lina Loh winning an NCMP seat.
- East Coast GRC and Fengshan SMC: both wards were part of the former GRC in the 2011 and being the narrowest PAP-win for a GRC in that election. The WP team at the time include NCMP Gerald Giam and Png Eng Huat, who later elected in Hougang SMC after the 2012 by-election.
- Holland-Bukit Timah GRC: the SDP's A-team led by leaders Chee Soon Juan and chairman Paul Tambyah.
- MacPherson SMC: a three-cornered contest between WP and NSP.
- Marine Parade GRC: the WP, led by NCMP Yee Jenn Jong, would contest that GRC for the first time after an unsuccessful nomination bid back in 1992; that ward also include Joo Chiat SMC, which Yee from the WP had narrowly defeated in the last election.
- Punggol East SMC: the ward won by WP in the 2013 by-election and sitting MP Charles Chong was fielded in attempt to unseat incumbent Lee Li Lian.
- Tampines GRC: fielded by the NSP's A-team which led by Lim Tean.
- Tanjong Pagar GRC: Tanjong Pagar faced its first-ever contest since its formation in 1991, and their incumbent PAP do not have Lee Kuan Yew; their opposing team was led by SingFirst Secretary-General Tan Jee Say (also a 2011 Presidential candidate).

=== Other constitution changes ===
Election Department raised the cap for their election expenses to S$4 per voter in a constituency divided by number of seats, up from S$3.50 previously which was first raised in the previous election. The ballot paper will also be printed to include passport photographs of candidates for better identification; these changes were first enacted on the 2011 Presidential election. ELD also published a 67-page handbook, advising candidates against "negative campaigning practices", and drones are banned in rallies.

While the campaign and election were held during the seventh lunar month, Singapore Police Force issued a notice whereas political activities must be separate from Getai activities.

In an election's first, sample counts were released by the Elections Department to prevent speculation and misinformation from unofficial sources while counting is underway. All sample counts were released at 10PM, about two hours after polling ended, where counts were within a 4% error margin at a 95% confidence rate. Sample counts works differently to exit polls, where they are illegal under the Parliamentary Elections Act due to privacy concerns, as it was last occurred during the 2013 Punggol East by-election where an exit poll was attempted.

== Timeline ==
Date	Event
24 July	Publication of Electoral Boundaries report
27 July	Certification of Registers of Electors
25 August	Dissolution of 12th Parliament; Writ of Election issued
28 August	Deadline of Submission of Political Donation Certificates
1 September	Nomination Day/Live Forum Broadcast
1–9 September	Campaigning Period
3 September	First Live Political Party Broadcast
10 September	Cooling-off Day/Second Live Political Party Broadcast
11 September	Polling Day
15 September	Overseas Votes Counting
16 September	Candidates revealed for Non-Constituency Member of Parliament
1 October	13th Parliament assembled
15 January 2016	Opening of 13th Parliament

=== Nomination centres ===
Nominations by various opposition parties as on nomination day on 1 September 2015. Banded shading indicates constituencies with three-cornered contests. (People's Action Party is not included in the map as the party is contesting in all seats).

The Elections Department issued the following information upon the issuance of the writ of election

- Date: 1 September 2015
- Time: 11:00 a.m. to 12.00 p.m.
- Returning Officer: Ng Wai Choong
- Election Deposit: S$14,500 (down from S$16,000 in 2011)

Nomination centre	Electoral division(s)
Assumption Pathway School	Bukit Panjang SMC; Holland–Bukit Timah GRC^{IO}
Bendemeer Primary School	Jalan Besar GRC^{M} Radin Mas SMC; Tanjong Pagar GRC^{IO}
Chua Chu Kang Primary School	Chua Chu Kang GRC^{M} Hong Kah North SMC; Pioneer SMC
Fengshan Primary School	East Coast GRC^{M} Fengshan SMC; Pasir Ris–Punggol GRC^{M} Punggol East SMC
Keming Primary School	Bukit Batok SMC; Jurong GRC^{IO} West Coast GRC^{IO} Yuhua SMC
Kong Hwa School	MacPherson SMC; Marine Parade GRC^{M} Mountbatten SMC; Potong Pasir SMC
Poi Ching School	Hougang SMC; Tampines GRC^{M}
Raffles Institution	Aljunied GRC^{M} Ang Mo Kio GRC^{IO} Bishan–Toa Payoh GRC^{M} Sengkang West SMC
Yishun Primary School	Marsiling–Yew Tee GRC^{M} Nee Soon GRC^{IO} Sembawang GRC^{M}

- A ^{M} indicates a GRC requires a Malay/Muslim minority candidate, while ^{IO} indicates a GRC requires an Indian or other minority candidate

=== Nomination day and campaigning events ===
Campaigning began from 1 September and ended on 9 September to canvass votes through physical rallies and stream on various media platforms. A live debate was held on 1 September in English and Chinese channel platforms, followed by two party political broadcasts airing on 3 and 10 September. The eve of polling day, known as cooling-off day, prohibits party from campaigning except for party political broadcasts.

=== Outgoing incumbents and incoming candidates ===
A total of 72 candidates made their political debut this election, among which the PAP team include former Second Permanent Secretary Chee Hong Tat, former Chief of Defence Force Ng Chee Meng, alongside a former MediaCorp television personality, a former police assistant commissioner, a founder of an organisation focusing animal welfare, a son and a nephew of former cabinet ministers among others. Opposition figures debuting in this election include founders of future opposition parties Lim Tean and Ravi Philemon, SDP with Paul Tambyah, and lawyer M Ravi standing under the RP banner.

14 MPs from the 12th Parliament stepped down this election, including former Deputy Prime Minister Wong Kan Seng and other cabinet ministers Raymond Lim, Lui Tuck Yew and Mah Bow Tan. One MP died during the term in office on 23 March this year, which is former Minister Mentor and first Prime Minister of Singapore Lee Kuan Yew, who served the Tanjong Pagar division for a record 60 years, the longest tenure for any elected MPs; in turn, this was also the first election where none of the MPs from either the original Parliament or pre-independent Legislature to represent this election.

== Results ==
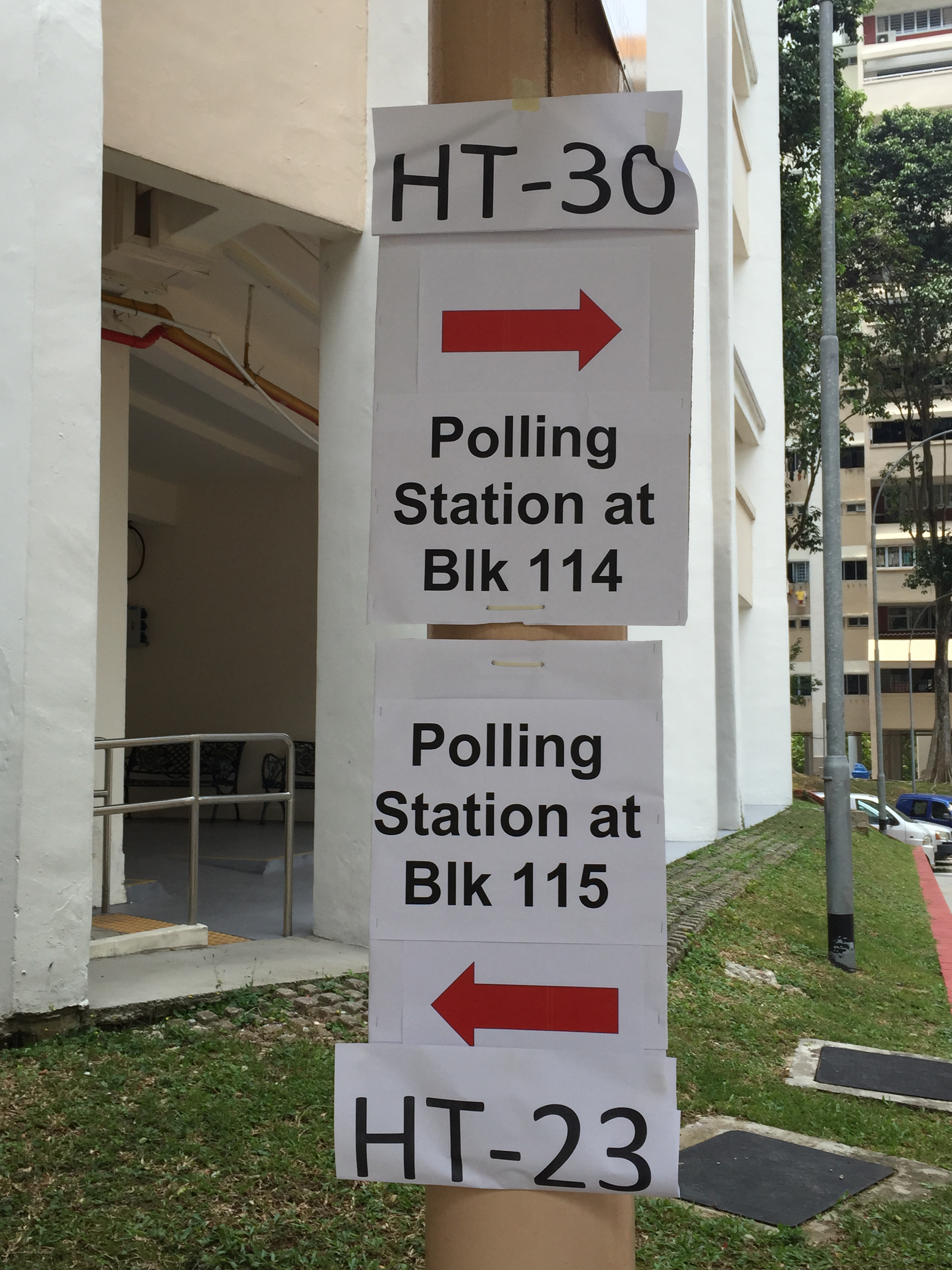
Signs pointing to polling stations in Clementi, in Holland–Bukit Timah GRC

Vote counting commenced after voting closed at 8pm. The results were announced by returning officer Ng Wai Choong, chief executive director of the Energy Market Authority. At 11.31pm (SGT), Sengkang West SMC, which re-elected PAP incumbent Lam Pin Min, was the first constituency to be called. All results were called by 3.10am, with the WP team in Aljunied GRC being re-elected within a 2% margin following an election recount.

Contrary to expectations of a tougher contest as there are no walkovers this election, PAP had one of its best results since 2001, increasing their vote share by a tenth to 69.86%. Many of the constituencies had swings towards the PAP, with the biggest swing being the Bishan–Toa Payoh GRC, with 16.66% followed by Potong Pasir SMC with 16.05%. The best-performing constituency for the PAP in the election was Jurong GRC, where it received 79.28% of the vote; it was also the first election where a GRC was the best-performing constituency as the top scorers in past elections were all SMCs. The WP had their vote shares greatly reduced, and while they are able to retain Aljunied GRC and Hougang SMC, they lost Punggol East SMC after gaining it in a 2013-by-election.

A poll held by the Institute of Policy Studies among 2,000 voters found that 79 percent believed "The whole election system is fair to all political parties,” up from 61 percent in 2011.

Voter turnout for the election was 93.7%, with 2,307,746 votes cast. Three candidates, Cheo Chai Chen from the NSP, and independent candidates Han Hui Hui and Samir Salim Neji, had their $14,500 election deposits forfeited. Cheo was the first previously-elected opposition MP to have its deposit forfeited, while Samir set a record for the worst result in any general election, garnering a vote share of only 0.60% of the vote, or 150 votes, surpassing the previous record in 1984 of Teo Kim Hoe's 0.81%. (Note: If counting by-elections, the SDA's Desmond Lim's 0.57% share attained in a 2013 by-election still holds the record-low score at the time of the election in post-independence Singapore until 2025.)

Popular vote
1. PAP (69.9%)
2. WP (12.5%)
3. SDP (3.76%)
4. NSP (3.53%)
5. RP (2.63%)
6. Others (7.73%)
Elected seats won
1. 83 seats (PAP) (93.3%)
2. 6 seats (WP) (6.74%)

Party	Votes	%	Seats	+/–
People's Action Party	1,579,183	69.86	83	+2
Workers' Party	282,143	12.48	9	0
Singapore Democratic Party	84,931	3.76	0	0
National Solidarity Party	79,826	3.53	0	0
Reform Party	59,517	2.63	0	0
Singaporeans First	50,867	2.25	0	New
Singapore People's Party	49,107	2.17	0	0
Singapore Democratic Alliance	46,550	2.06	0	0
People's Power Party	25,475	1.13	0	New
Independents	2,780	0.12	0	New
Total	2,260,379	100.00	92	+2
Valid votes	2,260,379	97.95		
Invalid/blank votes	47,367	2.05		
Total votes	2,307,746	100.00		
Registered voters/turnout	2,462,926	93.70		
Source: Singapore Elections

Opposition parties contested vote
Party	Votes
WP	39.75%
SDP	31.23%
SDA	27.11%
SPP	27.08%
NSP	25.27%
PPP	23.09%
SingFirst	21.49%
RP	20.60%
Independents	5.43%

=== By constituency ===
Candidates and results of 2015 Singaporean general election
Division	Seats	Voters	Party	Candidate(s)	Votes	Votes %	Sample counts	Overseas vote difference	Swing	Margins
Bukit Batok SMC	1	27,077	People's Action Party	David Ong	18,234	73.02 / 100	74 / 100	▲0.03	N/A	46.64%
Bukit Batok SMC	1	27,077	Singapore Democratic Party	Sadasivam Veriyah	6,588	26.38 / 100	26 / 100	▼0.02	N/A	46.64%
Bukit Batok SMC	1	27,077	Independent (Loses $14,500 deposit)	Samir Salim Neji	150	0.60 / 100	0 / 100	Steady	N/A	46.64%
Bukit Panjang SMC	1	34,317	People's Action Party	Teo Ho Pin	21,954	68.38 / 100	69 / 100	Steady	▲2.11	36.76%
Bukit Panjang SMC	1	34,317	Singapore Democratic Party	Khung Wai Yeen	10,152	31.62 / 100	31 / 100	Steady	▼2.11	36.76%
Fengshan SMC	1	23,427	People's Action Party	Cheryl Chan	12,417	57.50 / 100	57 / 100	▼0.02	N/A	5.00%
Fengshan SMC	1	23,427	Workers' Party	Dennis Tan (Note: Elected as NCMP.)	9,176	42.50 / 100	43 / 100	▲0.02	N/A	5.00%
Hong Kah North SMC	1	28,145	People's Action Party	Amy Khor	19,628	74.76 / 100	74 / 100	Steady	▲4.15	49.52%
Hong Kah North SMC	1	28,145	Singapore People's Party	Ravi Philemon	6,627	25.24 / 100	26 / 100	Steady	▼4.15	49.52%
Hougang SMC	1	24,097	Workers' Party	Png Eng Huat	13,027	57.66 / 100	58 / 100	▲0.03	▼7.14	15.32%
Hougang SMC	1	24,097	People's Action Party	Lee Hong Chuang	9,565	42.34 / 100	42 / 100	▼0.03	▲7.14	15.32%
MacPherson SMC	1	28,511	People's Action Party	Tin Pei Ling	17,251	65.60 / 100	63 / 100	▲0.02	N/A	32.01%
MacPherson SMC	1	28,511	Workers' Party	Bernard Chen	8,833	33.59 / 100	36 / 100	▼0.02	N/A	32.01%
MacPherson SMC	1	28,511	National Solidarity Party (Loses $14,500 deposit)	Cheo Chai Chen	215	0.82 / 100	1 / 100	Steady	N/A	32.01%
Mountbatten SMC	1	24,143	People's Action Party	Lim Biow Chuan	15,331	71.86 / 100	72 / 100	▲0.02	▲13.24	43.72%
Mountbatten SMC	1	24,143	Singapore People's Party	Jeannette Chong-Aruldoss	6,004	28.14 / 100	28 / 100	▼0.02	▼13.24	43.72%
Pioneer SMC	1	25,458	People's Action Party	Cedric Foo	18,017	76.35 / 100	78 / 100	▲0.01	▲15.62	53.70%
Pioneer SMC	1	25,458	National Solidarity Party	Elvin Ong	5,581	23.65 / 100	22 / 100	▼0.01	▼15.62	53.70%
Potong Pasir SMC	1	17,407	People's Action Party	Sitoh Yih Pin	10,602	66.39 / 100	68 / 100	▼0.02	▲16.03	32.78%
Potong Pasir SMC	1	17,407	Singapore People's Party	Lina Loh	5,368	33.61 / 100	32 / 100	▲0.02	▼16.03	32.78%
Punggol East SMC	1	34,466	People's Action Party	Charles Chong	16,977	51.77 / 100	51 / 100	▲0.01	▼2.77	3.54%
Punggol East SMC	1	34,466	Workers' Party	Lee Li Lian	15,818	48.23 / 100	49 / 100	▼0.01	▲7.22	3.54%
Radin Mas SMC	1	28,906	People's Action Party	Sam Tan	20,246	77.25 / 100	77 / 100	Steady	▲10.15	64.53%
Radin Mas SMC	1	28,906	Reform Party	Kumar Appavoo	3,333	12.72 / 100	14 / 100	▲0.01	▼20.18	64.53%
Radin Mas SMC	1	28,906	Independent (Loses $14,500 deposit)	Han Hui Hui	2,630	10.03 / 100	9 / 100	▼0.01	N/A	64.53%
Sengkang West SMC	1	30,119	People's Action Party	Lam Pin Min	17,586	62.13 / 100	63 / 100	▲0.02	▲4.02	24.26%
Sengkang West SMC	1	30,119	Workers' Party	Koh Choong Yong	10,721	37.87 / 100	37 / 100	▼0.02	▼4.02	24.26%
Yuhua SMC	1	22,617	People's Action Party	Grace Fu	15,324	73.55 / 100	72 / 100	▲0.01	▲6.69	47.10%
Yuhua SMC	1	22,617	Singapore Democratic Party	Jaslyn Go	5,512	26.45 / 100	28 / 100	▼0.01	▼6.69	47.10%
Chua Chu Kang GRC	4	119,931	People's Action Party	Gan Kim Yong; Low Yen Ling; Yee Chia Hsing; Zaqy Mohamad	84,850	76.91 / 100	76 / 100	▲0.02	▲15.71	53.82%
Chua Chu Kang GRC	4	119,931	People's Power Party	Goh Meng Seng; Lee Tze Shih; Low Wai Choo; Syafarin Bin Sarif	25,475	23.09 / 100	24 / 100	▼0.02	▼15.71	53.82%
East Coast GRC	4	99,118	People's Action Party	Lee Yi Shyan; Lim Swee Say; Mohd Maliki Bin Osman; Jessica Tan	55,093	60.73 / 100	61 / 100	Steady	▲5.90	21.46%
East Coast GRC	4	99,118	Workers' Party	Daniel Goh; Gerald Giam; Leon Perera; Mohamed Fairoz Bin Shariff	35,622	39.27 / 100	39 / 100	Steady	▼5.90	21.46%
Holland–Bukit Timah GRC	4	104,491	People's Action Party	Vivian Balakrishnan; Christopher de Souza; Liang Eng Hwa; Sim Ann	62,786	66.60 / 100	66 / 100	▼0.02	▲6.52	33.20%
Holland–Bukit Timah GRC	4	104,491	Singapore Democratic Party	Chee Soon Juan; Paul Tambyah; Chong Wai Fung; Sidek Mallek Sidek	31,494	33.40 / 100	34 / 100	▲0.02	▼6.52	33.20%
Jalan Besar GRC	4	102,540	People's Action Party	Lily Neo; Heng Chee How; Denise Phua; Yaacob Ibrahim	63,644	67.75 / 100	67 / 100	▲0.02	N/A	35.50%
Jalan Besar GRC	4	102,540	Workers' Party	Frieda Chan; L Somasundaram; Redzwan Hafidz Abdul Razak; Adrian Sim	30,302	32.25 / 100	33 / 100	▼0.02	N/A	35.50%
Marsiling–Yew Tee GRC	4	107,599	People's Action Party	Halimah Yacob; Ong Teng Koon; Alex Yam; Lawrence Wong	68,546	68.73 / 100	69 / 100	Steady	N/A	37.46%
Marsiling–Yew Tee GRC	4	107,599	Singapore Democratic Party	Damanhuri Bin Abas; Bryan Lim; John Tan; Wong Souk Yee	31,185	31.27 / 100	31 / 100	Steady	N/A	37.46%
West Coast GRC	4	99,300	People's Action Party	Foo Mee Har; Lim Hng Kiang; S. Iswaran; Patrick Tay	71,214	78.57 / 100	78 / 100	Steady	▲12.00	57.14%
West Coast GRC	4	99,300	Reform Party	Kenneth Jeyaretnam; Noraini Yunus; Darren Soh; Andy Zhu	19,426	21.43 / 100	22 / 100	Steady	▼12.00	57.14%
Aljunied GRC	5	148,142	Workers' Party	Low Thia Khiang; Pritam Singh; Sylvia Lim; Faisal Manap; Chen Show Mao	70,050	50.96 / 100	52 / 100	▲0.01	▼3.76	1.92%
Aljunied GRC	5	148,142	People's Action Party	Yeo Guat Kwang; Victor Lye; Shamsul Kamar bin Mohamed Razali; Chua Eng Leong; Murali Pillai	67,424	49.04 / 100	48 / 100	▼0.01	▲3.76	1.92%
Bishan–Toa Payoh GRC	5	129,975	People's Action Party	Ng Eng Hen; Josephine Teo; Chee Hong Tat; Chong Kee Hiong; Saktiandi Supaat	86,701	73.59 / 100	74 / 100	Steady	▲16.66	47.18%
Bishan–Toa Payoh GRC	5	129,975	Singapore People's Party	Benjamin Pwee; Law Kim Hwee; Bryan Long; Mohamad Abdillah Bin Zamzuri; Mohamad Hamim Aliyas	31,108	26.41 / 100	26 / 100	Steady	▼16.66	47.18%
Jurong GRC	5	130,498	People's Action Party	Tharman Shanmugaratnam; Ang Wei Neng; Desmond Lee; Rahayu Mahzam; Tan Wu Meng	95,228	79.29 / 100	78 / 100	▲0.01	▲12.33	58.58%
Jurong GRC	5	130,498	Singaporeans First	David Foo; Sukdeu Singh; Ann Tan Peng; Wong Chee Wai; Wong Soon Hong	24,869	20.71 / 100	22 / 100	▼0.01	▼12.33	58.58%
Marine Parade GRC	5	146,244	People's Action Party	Goh Chok Tong; Fatimah Lateef; Seah Kian Peng; Tan Chuan-Jin; Edwin Tong	85,138	64.07 / 100	65 / 100	Steady	▲7.43	28.14%
Marine Parade GRC	5	146,244	Workers' Party	Yee Jenn Jong; He Ting Ru; Firuz Khan; Dylan Ng; Terence Tan	47,753	35.93 / 100	35 / 100	Steady	▼7.43	28.14%
Nee Soon GRC	5	132,289	People's Action Party	K. Shanmugam; Henry Kwek; Lee Bee Wah; Muhammad Faishal Ibrahim; Louis Ng	82,287	66.83 / 100	67 / 100	Steady	▲8.43	33.76%
Nee Soon GRC	5	132,289	Workers' Party	Kenneth Foo; Gurmit Singh Sadhu Singh; Luke Koh; Cheryl Loh; Ron Tan	40,841	33.17 / 100	33 / 100	Steady	▼8.43	33.76%
Sembawang GRC	5	144,672	People's Action Party	Khaw Boon Wan; Lim Wee Kiak; Amrin Amin; Ong Ye Kung; Vikram Nair	96,718	72.28 / 100	72 / 100	Steady	▲8.38	44.56%
Sembawang GRC	5	144,672	National Solidarity Party	Abdul Rasheed Abdul Kuthus; Kevryn Lim; Spencer Ng; Yadzeth Bin Haris; Eugene Yeo	37,087	27.72 / 100	28 / 100	Steady	▼8.38	44.56%
Tampines GRC	5	143,518	People's Action Party	Heng Swee Keat; Baey Yam Keng; Cheng Li Hui; Desmond Choo; Masagos Zulkifli	95,305	72.07 / 100	72 / 100	▲0.01	▲14.85	44.14%
Tampines GRC	5	143,518	National Solidarity Party	Lim Tean; Choong Hon Heng; Fong Chin Leong; Nor Lella; Sebastian Teo	36,943	27.93 / 100	28 / 100	▼0.01	▼14.85	44.14%
Tanjong Pagar GRC	5	130,752	People's Action Party	Chan Chun Sing; Chia Shi-Lu; Indranee Rajah; Joan Pereira; Melvin Yong	90,635	77.71 / 100	78 / 100	Steady	N/A	55.42%
Tanjong Pagar GRC	5	130,752	Singaporeans First	Tan Jee Say; Ang Yong Guan; Chirag Praful Desai; Melvyn Chiu; Mohamad Fahmi Bin Ahmad Rais	25,998	22.29 / 100	22 / 100	Steady	N/A	55.42%
Ang Mo Kio GRC	6	187,771	People's Action Party	Lee Hsien Loong; Ang Hin Kee; Darryl David; Gan Thiam Poh; Intan Azura Mokhtar; Koh Poh Koon	135,316	78.64 / 100	78 / 100	▲0.01	▲9.31	57.28%
Ang Mo Kio GRC	6	187,771	Reform Party	Gilbert Goh; Jesse Loo; Roy Ngerng; Osman Sulaiman; M Ravi; Siva Chandran	36,758	21.36 / 100	22 / 100	▼0.01	▼9.31	57.28%
Pasir Ris–Punggol GRC	6	187,396	People's Action Party	Teo Chee Hean; Janil Puthucheary; Ng Chee Meng; Sun Xueling; Teo Ser Luck; Zainal Sapari	125,166	72.89 / 100	73 / 100	Steady	▲8.10	45.78%
Pasir Ris–Punggol GRC	6	187,396	Singapore Democratic Alliance	Abu Mohamed; Harminder Pal Singh; Desmond Lim; Arthero Lim; Ong Teik Seng; Wong Way Weng	46,550	27.11 / 100	27 / 100	Steady	▼8.10	45.78%

=== By Community Development Council ===
Being the first post-independence Singapore election without uncontested walkovers, percentages across various parties have been fluctuated between WP and non-WP opposition parties across CDCs, with WP prevailing in the east, and non-WP on the west and central regions. Roughly one-third of the 89 seats fall under the eastern regions; excluding in the South West CDC, where WP fielded none of them, this brings the total cumulative seats to 72, of which WP fielded around 39% of them in that election.

Despite the WP being able to elect six seats, both being in the North East CDC, South East CDC outperformed the contested vote as compared to the North East CDC, largely attributing to the East Coast GRC and Fengshan SMC results which netted WP NCMP seats. Probably as a result, WP would limit their candidates by not fielding candidates in the North West or Central CDCs in subsequent elections, despite that all WP contests polled within the opposition national average of 30.14%. South East CDC also have the lowest PAP contested vote share by region, narrowly edging out North East CDC by 0.04%.

In addition to the ten WP-contested constituencies, four other constituencies that were not contested by the WP polled within the national average, namely Holland-Bukit Timah GRC, Marsiling-Yew Tee GRC, Potong Pasir SMC and Bukit Panjang SMC. The South West CDC is the only CDC where all seven constituencies polled above the PAP's national average, with six (except for Bukit Batok SMC) polling among the top ten performers by the PAP. Incidentally, South West CDC also holds the highest PAP vote share by CDC.

==== Votes polled ====
CDC			
CDC	PAP	WP	Others
Central	74.39%	7.19%	18.42%
Northeast	63.29%	19.91%	16.81%
Northwest	68.79%	8.45%	22.75%
Southeast	63.25%	34.62%	2.12%
Southwest	77.39%		22.61%
TOTAL	69.86%	12.48%	17.65%

==== Seats won ====
CDC	Seats			
CDC	Seats	PAP	WP	Others
Central	23	23	0	0
Northeast	18	12	6	0
Northwest	19	19	0	0
Southeast	12	12	0	0
Southwest	17	17		0
TOTAL	89	83	6	0

=== Analysis ===
- Constituencies with no comparison to 2011 were either due to them being new constituencies or the constituencies experiencing walkovers in the last election, unless otherwise stated.

==== Top 10 PAP performers ====
#	Constituency	People's Action Party			Opposition			
#	Constituency	Votes	%	Swing		Votes	%	Swing
1	Jurong GRC	95,080	79.28	▲12.32	Singaporeans First	24,848	20.72	▼12.32
2	Ang Mo Kio GRC	135,115	78.63	▲9.3	Reform Party	36,711	21.37	▼9.3
3	West Coast GRC	71,091	78.57	▲12	Reform Party	19,392	21.43	▼12
4	Tanjong Pagar GRC	90,635	77.71	Walkover	Singaporeans First	25,998	22.29	Walkover
5	Radin Mas SMC	20,230	77.25	▲10.15	Reform Party	3,329	12.71	▼10.15
5	Radin Mas SMC	20,230	77.25	▲10.15	Independent	2,629	10.04	▼10.15
6	Chua Chu Kang GRC	84,731	76.89	▲15.69	People's Power Party	25,460	23.11	▼15.69
7	Pioneer SMC	17,994	76.34	▲15.61	National Solidarity Party	5,578	23.66	▼15.61
8	Hong Kah North SMC	19,612	74.76	▲4.15	Singapore People's Party	6,621	25.24	▼4.15
9	Bishan–Toa Payoh GRC	86,514	73.59	▲16.66	Singapore People's Party	31,049	26.41	▼16.66
10	Yuhua SMC	15,298	73.54	▲6.68	Singapore Democratic Party	5,505	26.46	▼6.68

==== Top 10 opposition performers ====
#	Constituency	Opposition				People's Action Party		
#	Constituency	Party	Votes	%	Swing	Votes	%	Swing
1	Hougang SMC (Note: The WP retained Hougang SMC with a 62.08% vote share to PAP 37.92% during the 2012 by-election, which would saw a swing of 4.42% if the by-election result is compared to this election.)	Workers' Party	13,012	57.66	▼7.14	9,543	42.34	▲7.14
2	Aljunied GRC	Workers' Party	69,929	50.95	▼3.77	67,317	49.05	▲3.77
3	Punggol East SMC (Note: The WP gained Punggol East SMC with a 54.50% vote share to PAP 43.73% during the 2013 by-election, which would saw a swing of -6.26% and 8.03% respectively if the by-election result is compared to this election.)	Workers' Party	15,801	48.24	▲2.78	16,957	51.76	▼2.78
4	Fengshan SMC	Workers' Party	9,158	42.48	New	12,398	57.52	New
5	East Coast GRC	Workers' Party	35,547	39.27	▼5.9	54,981	60.73	▲5.9
6	Sengkang West SMC	Workers' Party	10,716	37.89	▼4	17,564	62.11	▲4
7	Marine Parade GRC	Workers' Party	47,629	35.93	▼7.43	84,939	64.07	▲7.43
8	MacPherson SMC (Note: The National Solidarity Party's candidate Cheo Chai Chen garnered only 215 votes (0.82%), but the score was unlisted from the table. If the opposition parties for MacPherson SMC were to sum up, the opposition won 9,041 votes (34.42%), which would still place it eighth in the table below.)	Workers' Party	8,826	33.60	New	17,227	65.58	New
9	Potong Pasir SMC	Singapore People's Party	5,353	33.59	▼16.05	10,581	66.41	▲16.05
10	Holland–Bukit Timah GRC	Singapore Democratic Party	31,380	33.38	▼6.54	62,630	66.62	▲6.54

==== Top 10 PAP Vote Swings ====
- Only the following constituencies may be compared with 2011 results as they existed in both elections, although most had changes in their electoral boundaries. (Note: The exception in this list Jalan Besar GRC, which is a reformation of Moulmein-Kallang GRC in the 2011 election. If the constituency is considered as an existing one, then Jalan Besar GRC would receive a 9.20% swing, which would still not have make it on the list.)

#	Constituency	2011 %	2015 %	Swing
1	Bishan–Toa Payoh GRC	56.93%	73.59%	▲16.66%
2	Potong Pasir SMC	50.36%	66.41%	▲16.05%
3	Chua Chu Kang GRC	61.20%	76.89%	▲15.69%
4	Pioneer SMC	60.73%	76.35%	▲15.62%
5	Tampines GRC	57.22%	72.06%	▲14.84%
6	Mountbatten SMC	15,290	71.84%	▲13.22%
7	Jurong GRC	66.96%	79.28%	▲12.32%
8	West Coast GRC	66.57%	78.57%	▲12.00%
9	Radin Mas SMC	67.10%	77.25%	▲10.15%
10	Ang Mo Kio GRC	69.33%	78.63%	▲9.30%

==== Top 10 opposition party swings ====
- The list will contain only the opposition parties that have challenged the same constituency in the 2015 election, and may be compared with 2015 results as they existed in both elections, although most had changes in their electoral boundaries. (Note: Mountbatten SPP's candidate Jeannette Chong-Aruldoss is not listed in the table as she contested in that same constituency under the National Solidarity Party banner in the 2011 election. If her result is considered, her swing of -13.24% would have placed her fifth in this table.) (Note: If the Hougang and Punggol East SMCs are excluded in the table due to different swings after the by-elections, it would have been replaced with the results for Yuhua SMC (-6.69% swing) and Holland–Bukit Timah GRC (-6.52% swing), respectively.)

#	Party	Constituency	2011 %	2015 %	Swing
1	Singapore People's Party	Bishan–Toa Payoh GRC	43.07%	26.41%	▼16.66%
2	Singapore People's Party	Potong Pasir SMC	40.64%	33.59%	▼16.05%
3	National Solidarity Party	Pioneer SMC	39.27%	23.65%	▼15.62%
4	National Solidarity Party	Tampines GRC	42.78%	27.93%	▼14.84%
5	Reform Party	West Coast GRC	33.43%	21.43%	▼12.00%
6	Reform Party	Ang Mo Kio GRC	30.67%	21.36%	▼9.31%
7	Workers' Party	Nee Soon GRC	41.60%	33.17%	▼8.43%
8	Singapore Democratic Alliance	Pasir Ris-Punggol GRC	35.21%	27.11%	▼8.10%
9	Workers' Party	Punggol East SMC	41.01%	48.23%	▲7.22%
10	Workers' Party	Hougang SMC	64.80%	57.66%	▼7.14%

==== Sample count accuracies ====
- Vote counts below are for votes cast in Singapore only and exclude votes cast overseas.

#	Constituency	People's Action Party			Opposition			
#	Constituency	Actual %	Sample %	Accuracy	Party	Actual %	Sample %	Accuracy
1	Tampines GRC	72.06%	72%	▲0.06%	National Solidarity Party	27.94%	28%	▼0.06%
2	Pasir Ris-Punggol GRC	72.89%	73%	▼0.11%	Singapore Democratic Alliance	27.11%	27%	▲0.11%
3	Mountbatten SMC	71.84%	72%	▼0.16%	Singapore People's Party	28.16%	28%	▲0.16%
4	Nee Soon GRC	66.83%	67%	▼0.17%	Workers' Party	33.17%	33%	▲0.17%
5	Radin Mas SMC	77.25%	77%	▲0.25%	Reform Party	12.71%	14%	▼1.29%
5	Radin Mas SMC	77.25%	77%	▲0.25%	Independent	10.04%	9%	▲1.04%
6	East Coast GRC	60.73%	61%	▼0.27%	Workers' Party	39.27%	39%	▲0.27%
7	Marsiling–Yew Tee GRC	68.73%	69%	▼0.27%	Singapore Democratic Party	31.27%	31%	▲0.27%
8	Sembawang GRC	72.28%	72%	▲0.28%	National Solidarity Party	27.72%	28%	▼0.28%
9	Tanjong Pagar GRC	77.71%	78%	▼0.29%	Singaporeans First	22.29%	22%	▲0.29%
10	Hougang SMC	42.31%	42%	▲0.31%	Workers' Party	57.69%	58%	▼0.31%
11	Bishan–Toa Payoh GRC	73.59%	74%	▼0.41%	Singapore People's Party	26.41%	26%	▲0.41%
12	Fengshan SMC	57.52%	57%	▲0.42%	Workers' Party	42.48%	42%	▼0.42%
13	West Coast GRC	78.57%	78%	▲0.57%	Reform Party	21.43%	22%	▼0.57%
14	Bukit Panjang SMC	68.38%	69%	▼0.62%	Singapore Democratic Party	31.62%	31%	▲0.62%
15	Holland–Bukit Timah GRC	66.62%	66%	▲0.62%	Singapore Democratic Party	33.38%	34%	▼0.62%
16	Ang Mo Kio GRC	78.63%	78%	▲0.63%	Reform Party	21.37%	22%	▼0.63%
17	Jalan Besar GRC	67.73%	67%	▲0.73%	Workers' Party	32.27%	33%	▼0.73%
18	Hong Kah North SMC	74.76%	74%	▲0.76%	Singapore People's Party	25.24%	26%	▼0.76%
19	Punggol East SMC	51.76%	51%	▲0.76%	Workers' Party	48.24%	49%	▼0.76%
20	Chua Chu Kang GRC	76.89%	76%	▲0.89%	People's Power Party	23.11%	24%	▼0.89%
21	Sengkang West SMC	62.11%	63%	▼0.89%	Workers' Party	37.89%	37%	▲0.89%
22	Marine Parade GRC	64.07%	65%	▼0.93%	Workers' Party	35.93%	35%	▲0.93%
23	Bukit Batok SMC	73.00%	74%	▼1%	Singapore Democratic Party	26.40%	26%	▲0.4%
23	Bukit Batok SMC	73.00%	74%	▼1%	Independent	0.60%	0%	▼0.6%
24	Aljunied GRC	49.05%	48%	▲1.05%	Workers' Party	50.95%	52%	▼1.05%
25	Jurong GRC	79.28%	78%	▲1.28%	Singaporeans First	20.72%	22%	▼1.28%
26	Yuhua SMC	73.54%	72%	▲1.54%	Singapore Democratic Party	26.46%	28%	▼1.54%
27	Potong Pasir SMC	66.41%	68%	▼1.59%	Singapore People's Party	33.59%	32%	▲1.59%
28	Pioneer SMC	76.34%	78%	▼1.66%	National Solidarity Party	23.66%	22%	▲1.66%
29	MacPherson SMC	65.58%	63%	▲2.58%	Workers' Party	33.60%	36%	▼2.4%
29	MacPherson SMC	65.58%	63%	▲2.58%	National Solidarity Party	0.82	1%	▼0.18%

== Post-election ==
=== PAP's response and government ===
In their post-election conference by Lee Hsien Loong, Lee told that the results are an endorsement and was "deeply humbled" on a strong mandate, with younger voters called it as an "important conclusion" from the polls. Lee also added that the election is a showing of "a strong signal of confidence" after his father Kuan Yew's death, and vowed to make a strong government announcing the cabinet reshuffle at due course. Lee also vowed to wrestle back Aljunied GRC and Hougang SMC at the next election, while also supported diverse voices as well. Deputy Prime Minister Tharman Shanmugaratnam, being aware about the nationwide swing and his ward being the best-performing ward this election, felt that it did not read any fine differences due to an overlap between opposition proposals and PAP policies, but he also told that it "basically it's the same agenda".

Two weeks after the election concluded, Lee announced that two existing MPs and five fresh MPs were included in his fourth Cabinet. They were Parliamentary secretaries Amrin Amin and Baey Yam Keng, Ministers of State Chee Hong Tat, Janil Puthucheary and Koh Poh Koon, and acting Education ministers Ng Chee Meng and Ong Ye Kung. It was also announced that two new Coordinating Minister portfolios will be created, bringing that number to three, which were Transport minister Khaw Boon Wan (for Infrastructure) and Deputy Prime Ministers Teo Chee Hean (for National Security) and Tharman Shanmugaratnam (for Economic and Social Policies). Six existing minister's portfolios are also reassigned, with the most notable being Heng Swee Keat who now assumed the role of Finance. Lee Yi Shyan was the only office holder to step down from the office and returned to a backbencher. The cabinet was sworn on 1 October, and the 13th Parliament commenced on 15 January the following year.

=== WP's response ===
Workers' Party's leader Low Thia Khiang stated on media at Hougang Stadium that they have "withstand" the nationwide swing and acknowledged the defeat of Punggol East SMC and those other constituencies they contested, and Low reminded the PAP government to "build trust" and "act fairly" to every Singaporeans. Punggol East SMC MP Lee Li Lian stated on media that she was "humbled" about her brief two-year tenure while thanking their supporters and volunteers. Hougang SMC MP Png Eng Huat, who was re-elected for another term, while pledged that he would continue to serve his residents and represent in Parliament, he however disagreed that the vote swing may have been attributed to the ongoing Aljunied-Hougang-Punggol East Town Council funding scandals, which began in 2012. In the following morning, chairwoman Sylvia Lim suggested on an interview that their swing either may have been attributed to PAP's strong mandate and concerned that the voters would felt that the government might be "dislodged" due to the opposition's presence, or the competition where every seats are being contested which she described it as a "pushback".

The Elections Department revealed in a recount for Aljunied GRC that WP won out three out of the five divisions by a difference of at least thousands of votes; the other two divisions, Paya Lebar's Murali Pillai (who would later elect in Bukit Batok SMC eight months later) and Serangoon's Yeo Guat Kwang, were voted in favour to PAP by hundreds of votes. This marked the first known instance since the creation of the Group Representation Constituency in 1988 where the winning team didn't win all the divisions, as the GRC is elected on a general ticket and winner-take-all system.

Under the current constitution, there are a minimum nine opposition members to serve in the upcoming Parliament (which was later raised to 12 when the Parliament opens and the amendment was made on 27 January 2016), and while WP managed to elect six MPs, WP gained an additional three seats of Non-constituency Member of Parliament, with the best losers given to Lee, Fengshan SMC's Dennis Tan, and one seat for East Coast GRC, given to Leon Perera. On 16 September 2015, Lee declined the position, making her the first candidate since 1984 to formally do so, while Tan and Perera took up. On 18 January 2016, WP filled a motion to allow Daniel Goh to take her place as NCMP. The motion was passed by the legislature, and Goh was later sworn in on 5 February 2016. With these allocation, the 13th Parliament marked the first time since 1986 where there are only two parties represented the Parliament; it also marked the end of the presence of Singapore People's Party since their debut in 1997 and the presence of the Chiam's family since 1984.

Following the election, Aljunied-Hougang-Punggol East Town Council was renamed back to Aljunied-Hougang. Responding to Charles Chong's allegations of missing town council funds, vice-chairman of the AHTC Png asked Chong about the missing money, in which Chong replied but without any proper explaination. In February 2018, Png in a Facebook post, said Aljunied-Hougang Town Council (AHTC which had managed Punggol East SMC from 2013 to 2015) had resolved all its accounting lapses and $22.8 million to $26.3 million attributed to Punggol East is in its every financial statement since 2013. Pasir Ris-Punggol Town Council also had an unqualified financial statement for the 2016/2017 financial year which "means there was no such missing money else the accounts would be qualified". While interviewed by The Straits Times, Chong said the AHTC's financial statements were all qualified by their own auditors and questioned about an ongoing court case by AHTC against its town councillors.

By 11 October 2019, towards the end of the term, the High Court of Singapore found WP members and town councillors, and FMSS, guilty for breaching their duties and were liable for damages, citing that their leaders had "put political interests above that" of AHTC and residents; and on 5 November, they had since lodged a successful appeal following a fundraiser in 2017 and were awarded costs for their appeals in 2023.

=== Other opposition responses ===
While Singapore Democratic Party was among the first parties to launch their campaigns dating back in January with alternative policies, their party's refreshed image, and the return of Chee Soon Juan, their party still unable to win any seats since their last win dated back in 1991. Chee told on their media after the election cited that their party came from a "deep trough" and told they have seen a "good trajectory" given they have taken advantage on using internet and social media. Chee also noted that their task ahead is not just winning the voter's hearts and minds but encouraged open policies as well. In another interview on 13 September, Chee raised his possibility on working with WP in the future. Likewise, Reform Party's chief Kenneth Jeyaretnam respected the outcome, added that the voters "got the government they deserve" and reminded he will not "want to hear any more complaints".

=== Overseas votes ===
Overseas votes were counted on 15 September, four days after the elections. ELD announced that the turnout was 3,415 (out of 4,868), and 52 votes have been rejected overall. All but two of the constituencies had voted in line with PAP-winning candidates (there were 2,399 votes), except for Aljunied GRC (which WP won the overseas vote) and Hougang SMC (which PAP won the overseas vote despite its loss), and the final popular vote for the PAP was untouched at 69.86%. All but 11 constituencies had a final percentage adjusted by no more than 0.04%, with the exceptions being Bishan-Toa Payoh GRC, Bukit Panjang SMC, East Coast GRC, Hong Kah North SMC, Marine Parade GRC, Marsiling-Yew Tee GRC, Nee Soon GRC, Pasir Ris-Punggol GRC, Sembawang GRC, Tanjong Pagar GRC and West Coast GRC, and one candidate for each of the three-cornered contests (Independent candidate Samir Salim Neji in Bukit Batok SMC, NSP's Cheo Chai Chen in MacPherson SMC, and PAP's Sam Tan in Radin Mas SMC). ELD also added that Samir and Cheo received none of the overseas votes. The counting was held at the ELD Training Centre in Victoria Street under witness of several candidates such as Yee Jenn Jong.

== See also ==
- Elections in Singapore
- 2016 Bukit Batok by-election – the only by-election held within a year after the election
