= Lee Hong Chuang =

Singaporean politician (born 1971)

The Honourable Lee Hong Chuang PBM BBM
- 李宏壮

Member of the Singapore Parliament for Jurong East–Bukit Batok GRC
- Incumbent
- Assumed office 3 May 2025
- Preceded by: Constituency established
- Majority: 69,350 (53.34%)

Personal details
- Born: 25 April 1971 (age 55) Singapore
- Party: People's Action Party
- Occupation: Politician; businessman

Lee Hong Chuang (Note: Chinese: 李宏壮; pinyin: Lǐ Hóngzhuàng) PBM BBM (born 25 April 1971) is a Singaporean politician and business executive. A member of the governing People's Action Party (PAP), he has been the Member of Parliament (MP) for the Hong Kah North division of Jurong East–Bukit Batok Group Representation Constituency (GRC) since 2025.

== Career ==
Lee works in information technology. He is also a former national gymnast, and the vice-president of the Singapore Wushu Dragon and Lion Dance Federation. Lee helped organise the 2010 Summer Youth Olympics and 2015 SEA Games.

Lee received the Pingat Bakti Masyarakat (PBM) (Note: Malay: Public Service Medal) in 2005. In 2013, he received the Bintang Bakti Masyarakat (BBM) (Note: Malay: Public Service Star) as the chairperson of the T-Net Advisory Council under the People's Association (PA).

=== Political career ===
Lee began volunteering for the PAP in 1989 and became a PAP activist at the party's Teck Ghee branch in 2004.

In September 2014, Lee replaced Desmond Choo as the grassroots advisor (Note: An individual appointed for "grassroots engagement and outreach" in a GRC division or SMC who, according to the PA, has to be aligned with the "Government of the day"; in practice, they are a member of the PAP. They do not need to be the elected MP for the area.) for Hougang Single Member Constituency (SMC), a stronghold for the Workers' Party (WP). He was later revealed to be the PAP candidate for the constituency in the leadup to the 2015 general election. He was defeated by incumbent Png Eng Huat, obtaining 42.34% of the vote.

During the 2020 general election, Lee was fielded again in Hougang SMC; he was defeated by WP candidate Dennis Tan, receiving a decreased 38.79% of the vote.

In October 2023, Lee was replaced by Jackson Lam as the grassroots advisor for Hougang SMC.

During the 2025 general election, Lee was announced as a member of the PAP team for the newly created Jurong East–Bukit Batok GRC and assigned to the Hong Kah North division. He became an MP after the team defeated Red Dot United (RDU) with 76.67% of the vote. Lee has served as the Vice-Chairman of the Jurong East–Bukit Batok Town Council since 2025.

== Personal life ==
Lee was raised in western Singapore and has two children. He can speak Teochew.

== Notes ==
Parliament of Singapore
New constituency	Member of Parliament for Jurong East–Bukit Batok GRC; 2025–present Served alongside: Grace Fu, David Hoe, Murali Pillai, Rahayu Mahzam	Incumbent
