= David Hoe =

Singaporean politician

The Honourable David Hoe
- 许德财
- David Hoe in September 2026

Member of Parliament for Jurong East–Bukit Batok GRC
- Incumbent
- Assumed office 3 May 2025
- Preceded by: Constituency created
- Majority: 69,350 (53.34%)

Personal details
- Born: David Hoe Teck Chye; 31 December 1987 (age 38) Singapore
- Party: People's Action Party
- Children: 2
- Education: National University of Singapore; Singapore Management University
- Occupation: Politician; charity director

David Hoe Teck Chye (Note: Chinese: 许德财; pinyin: Xǔ Décái; Pe̍h-ōe-jī: Khó͘ Tek-châi) (born 31 December 1987) is a Singaporean politician, charity director, and former educator. A member of the governing People's Action Party (PAP), he has served as a Member of Parliament (MP) for the Jurong East–Bukit Batok Group Representation Constituency since 2025.

Hoe is a District Councillor with the Central Singapore Community Development Council and the co-chair of the Education Roundtable at Advisory Singapore, a youth-led non-profit organisation. He is recognised as a community leader for his efforts in youth empowerment and advocacy for equal access to opportunities. He is also a Philip Yeo Initiative (PYI) Fellow, a former educator at Eunoia Junior College, and a former council member of the National Youth Council.

== Education ==
Hoe attended Beatty Secondary School, where he was placed in the Normal (Technical) stream after scoring 110 on the Primary School Leaving Examination (PSLE), having come from the EM3 stream in primary school.

After completing his GCE 'N' Levels, he received the Lee Kuan Yew Award for Outstanding Normal Course students in 2005. He later wrote to then-Minister for Education Tharman Shanmugaratnam and was granted permission to repeat Secondary 3 and 4 in the Express stream to qualify for entry into the teaching profession.

Hoe subsequently attended Catholic Junior College, and received a teaching scholarship from the Ministry of Education.

He earned a Bachelor of Social Sciences in Economics from the National University of Singapore (NUS), where he was part of the Tembusu College residential programme. He later obtained a Postgraduate Diploma in Education (PGDE) from Nanyang Technological University and a Master of Science in Applied Economics from Singapore Management University.

== Career ==
Hoe began his career teaching Economics at Eunoia Junior College, where he also served as Deputy Head for Student Leadership and Talent Management. He subsequently joined the Ministry of Education’s UPLIFT Programme Office, working on initiatives supporting students from disadvantaged backgrounds.

In 2021, he joined YTL PowerSeraya as a business analyst and was appointed Principal Business Architect in 2022. In 2025, Hoe joined The Majurity Trust, a philanthropic organisation focused on community impact in Singapore, as Director of Philanthropy.

Ahead of the 2025 Singaporean general election, Hoe was announced as a candidate for the People's Action Party (PAP). He was elected to the Parliament of Singapore on 3 May 2025, representing the newly created Jurong East–Bukit Batok GRC. Hoe has served as the Vice-Chairman of the Jurong East–Bukit Batok Town Council since 2025.

== Awards ==
- 2005: Lee Kuan Yew Award for Outstanding Normal Course students.
- 2015: Finalist, inaugural The Straits Times Singaporean of the Year award.
- 2022: ASEAN Plus Youth Volunteer Award for contributions to community initiatives.

== Personal life ==
Hoe is married and has two children, a daughter and a son. During his early years, following his parents’ divorce and his mother’s loss of eyesight, he sold tissues in hawker centres and on the streets. His mother died from a stroke when he was 12, after which he lived with his father and older brother.

== Notes ==
Parliament of Singapore
New constituency	Member of Parliament for Jurong East–Bukit Batok GRC; 2025–present Served alongside: (2025–present): Murali Pillai, Rahayu Mahzam, Lee Hong Chuang, Grace Fu	Incumbent
