= Jurong East–Bukit Batok Group Representation Constituency =

Electoral division in Singapore

Jurong East–Bukit Batok
- Group representation constituency for the Parliament of Singapore
- Region: West Region, Singapore
- Electorate: 142,753

Current constituency
- Created: 2025; 1 year ago
- Seats: 5
- Party: People's Action Party
- Members: Grace Fu (Yuhua); David Hoe (Clementi); Lee Hong Chuang (Hong Kah North); Murali Pillai (Bukit Batok); Rahayu Mahzam (Bukit Batok East)
- Town Council: Jurong–Clementi–Bukit Batok
- Created from: Bukit Batok SMC; Hong Kah North SMC (Bukit Batok West); Jurong GRC (Bukit Batok East, Clementi); Yuhua SMC

The Jurong East–Bukit Batok Group Representation Constituency is a five-member group representation constituency (GRC) in the western region of Singapore. It has five divisions: Bukit Batok, Bukit Batok East, Clementi, Hong Kah North and Yuhua, managed by Jurong–Clementi–Bukit Batok Town Council. The current Members of Parliament (MPs) for the constituency are Minister for Sustainability and the Environment and Minister-in-charge of Trade Relations Grace Fu, David Hoe, Lee Hong Chuang, Murali Pillai and Rahayu Mahzam from the People's Action Party (PAP).

== Electoral history ==
Jurong East–Bukit Batok GRC was created for the 2025 general election by merging parts of Hong Kah North Single Member Constituency (SMC) and Jurong GRC with the whole of Bukit Batok SMC and part of Yuhua SMC. Jurong Central SMC was created from Jurong GRC and the remainder of Yuhua SMC, while the Jurong Spring and Taman Jurong divisions of Jurong GRC were reassigned to West Coast–Jurong West GRC.

The PAP announced that Grace Fu, incumbent MP for Yuhua SMC, would lead a team comprising fellow incumbents Murali Pillai (Bukit Batok SMC) and Rahayu Mahzam (Bukit Batok East), Lee Hong Chuang, a former branch chairperson (Note: Another name for a "grassroots advisor", an individual appointed for "grassroots engagement and outreach" in a GRC division or SMC who, according to the People's Association (PA), has to be aligned with the "Government of the day"; in practice, they are a member of the PAP. They do not need to be the elected MP for the area.) for Hougang SMC, and political newcomer David Hoe. They defeated a team from Red Dot United (RDU) with 76.67% of the vote.

== Members of Parliament ==
Divisions or wards of Jurong East–Bukit Batok GRC as of the 2025 general election:
1 Bukit Batok
2 Bukit Batok East
3 Clementi
4 Hong Kah North
5 Yuhua

Year	Division	Members of Parliament	Party
Formation
2025	Bukit Batok; Bukit Batok East; Clementi; Hong Kah North; Yuhua	Murali Pillai; Rahayu Mahzam; David Hoe; Lee Hong Chuang; Grace Fu	PAP

== Electoral results ==
Note: The Elections Department does not include rejected votes when calculating the vote shares of candidates. Hence, all candidates' vote shares will total to 100% at any given election (may not appear so in multi-way contests due to rounding).

=== Elections in 2020s ===
General Election 2025
Party	Candidate	Votes	%
PAP	Grace Fu David Hoe Lee Hong Chuang Murali Pillai Rahayu Mahzam	99,692	76.67
RDU	Ben Puah Harish Mohanadas Osman Sulaiman Liyana Dhamirah Marcus Neo	30,342	23.33
Majority		69,350	53.34
Total valid votes		130,034	97.60
Rejected ballots		3,198	2.40
Turnout		133,232	93.33
Registered electors		142,753	
PAP win (new seat)			
