= Grace Fu =

Singaporean politician (born 1964)

The Honourable Grace Fu DCMG
- 傅海燕
- Fu in 2026

Minister for Sustainability and the Environment
- Incumbent
- Assumed office 27 July 2020
- Prime Minister: Lee Hsien Loong; Lawrence Wong
- Preceded by: Masagos Zulkifli (as Minister for the Environment and Water Resources)

Organising Secretary of the People's Action Party
- Incumbent
- Assumed office 26 November 2022 Serving with Edwin Tong
- Prime Minister: Lawrence Wong
- Preceded by: Chan Chun Sing; Ng Eng Hen

Minister for Culture, Community and Youth
- In office 1 October 2015 – 26 July 2020
- Prime Minister: Lee Hsien Loong
- Preceded by: Lawrence Wong
- Succeeded by: Edwin Tong

Leader of the House
- In office 1 October 2015 – 23 August 2020
- Prime Minister: Lee Hsien Loong
- Deputy: Desmond Lee
- Preceded by: Ng Eng Hen
- Succeeded by: Indranee Rajah

Minister in the Prime Minister's Office
- In office 1 August 2012 – 30 September 2015
- Prime Minister: Lee Hsien Loong
- Preceded by: Lim Hwee Hua

Second Minister for the Environment and Water Resources
- In office 1 August 2012 – 30 September 2015
- Prime Minister: Lee Hsien Loong
- Minister: Vivian Balakrishnan

Second Minister for Foreign Affairs
- In office 1 August 2012 – 30 September 2015
- Prime Minister: Lee Hsien Loong
- Minister: K. Shanmugam
- Preceded by: Lui Tuck Yew
- Succeeded by: Josephine Teo (2017)

Member of Parliament for Jurong East–Bukit Batok GRC (Yuhua Division)
- Incumbent
- Assumed office 3 May 2025
- Preceded by: Constituency established
- Majority: 69,350 (53.34%)

Member of Parliament for Yuhua SMC
- In office 21 May 2011 – 15 April 2025
- Preceded by: Constituency established
- Succeeded by: Constituency abolished
- Majority: 2011: 7,107 (33.8%); 2015: 9,812 (47.10%); 2020: 8,230 (41.08%)

Member of Parliament for Jurong GRC (Yuhua Division)
- In office 27 April 2006 – 18 April 2011
- Preceded by: PAP held
- Succeeded by: Constituency abolished

Personal details
- Born: Grace Fu Hai Yien; 29 March 1964 (age 62) Singapore, Malaysia
- Party: People's Action Party
- Spouse: Ivan Lee
- Children: 3
- Education: National University of Singapore (BAcy, MBA)

Grace Fu Hai Yien (Note: Chinese: 傅海燕; pinyin: Fù Hǎiyàn) DCMG (born 29 March 1964) is a Singaporean accountant and politician who has served as the Organising Secretaries of the People's Action Party since 2025 and has been serving as Minister for Sustainability and the Environment since 2020, and Minister-in-charge of Trade Relations since 2024. A member of the governing People's Action Party (PAP), she has been the Member of Parliament (MP) for the Yuhua division of Jurong East–Bukit Batok Group Representation Constituency (GRC) since 2025. She had previously represented the Yuhua division of Jurong GRC between 2006 and 2011 and Yuhua Single Member Constituency (SMC) between 2011 and 2025.

An accountant by profession, Fu worked at Overseas Union Bank, Haw Par Group, and PSA Corporation before entering politics. She made her political debut in the 2006 general election as part of the five-member PAP team for Jurong GRC and won. After Yuhua SMC was carved from Jurong GRC, she won reelection there in the 2011 general election and would do so until 2025. Following the redrawing of electoral boundaries in the 2025 general election, Yuhua SMC was absorbed into Jurong East–Bukit Batok GRC, where she won reelection as part of a five-member PAP team.

Before her appointment as the Minister of Sustainability and the Environment, Fu served as Senior Minister of State for National Development and Education between 2008 and 2011, for the Environment and Water Resources and for the Information, Communications and the Arts between 2011 and 2012, Second Minister for Foreign Affairs between 2012 and 2015, Leader of the House and Minister for Culture, Community and Youth between 2015 and 2020.

== Early life and education ==
Fu was born on 29 March 1964 in Singapore, then a state in Malaysia. She was educated at Nanyang Girls' High School and Hwa Chong Junior College before graduating from the National University of Singapore in 1985 with a Bachelor of Accountancy with honours degree in 1985. She subsequently completed a Master of Business Administration degree at the NUS Business School in 1991.

== Career ==
Fu started her career at the Overseas Union Bank as an auditor from 1985 to 1988. She then joined the Haw Par Group, where she worked in corporate planning, financial control and business development from 1991 to 1995.

In October 1995, Fu joined PSA Corporation as Assistant Director (Finance). She took on additional responsibility as Vice-President (Marketing), and assumed the position of Financial Controller in October 1998. She was promoted to Executive Vice-President (Finance) in January 1999. In April 2003, Fu was appointed CEO of Singapore Terminals. In 2004, she became CEO of PSA South East Asia and Japan, where she was responsible for the business performance of PSA's flagship terminals in Singapore, Thailand, Brunei, and Japan.

Fu has been a non-practising member of the Institute of Singapore Chartered Accountants since 1992.

On 5 January 2024, Fu was elected as the President of the Singapore National Olympic Council. Tan Chuan-Jin, the previous president and Speaker of Parliament, had resigned after an extramarital affair with fellow PAP MP Cheng Li Hui.

== Political career ==
Fu made her political debut in the 2006 general election as part of the five-member PAP team contesting in Jurong GRC and won. Fu was subsequently elected as the Member of Parliament (MP) representing the Yuhua division of Jurong GRC in June 2006. She was one of 24 new PAP candidates introduced ahead of the general election.

On 1 August 2006, Fu was appointed Minister of State for National Development.

On 1 April 2008, Fu was promoted to Senior Minister of State for National Development, and appointed Senior Minister of State for Education concurrently.

At the 2011 general election, Fu contested in the newly created Yuhua SMC and won with 66.9% of the vote. Following the election, Fu was appointed Senior Minister of State for Information, Communications and the Arts, and Senior Minister of State for the Environment and Water Resources concurrently.

In January 2012, Fu expressed concerns over the planned 36–37% income cuts for ministers, saying that if ministerial pay was further reduced in the future, it would "make it harder for anyone considering political office". Her comments contributed to the public debate over the compensation and motivation of public officials, and were criticised by Singaporean netizens. Others defended her remark as fair, supporting her position that the loss of privacy and public scrutiny added to a large personal cost to working in public positions not found in the private sector.

On 31 July 2012, Fu was made full minister, becoming the second woman in Singapore's history, after Lim Hwee Hua, to become a full minister in the Cabinet. She served as Minister in the Prime Minister's Office, Second Minister for the Environment and Water Resources, and Second Minister for Foreign Affairs from 2012 to 2015.

In 2014, as the Minister in the Prime Minister's Office, Fu was in charge of the Municipal Services Office.

In 2015, Fu was appointed Minister for Culture, Community and Youth, becoming the first female minister in Singapore to head a ministry.

Following the 2020 general election, Fu became Organising Secretary of the PAP's Central Executive Committee (CEC).

Fu served as Leader of the House from 2015 to 2020, before being appointed Minister for Sustainability and the Environment in 2020.

She has also been a member of the Global Leaders Group on Antimicrobial Resistance, co-chaired by Prime Minister of Bangladesh Sheikh Hasina, and Prime Minister of Barbados Mia Mottley, since 2020.

On 14 January 2024, Fu became Minister-in-charge of Trade Relations after a cabinet reshuffle. S. Iswaran had previously held the position, as well as the ministership for transport, before he resigned in response to being prosecuted on 27 charges of corruption.

In 2025, Time named her to its Time100 Climate 2025 list. She earned the honor for, in part, planting trees so that Singapore could avoid overheating during hot weather. She also led efforts to utilize more renewable energy. "Climate mitigation and adaptation go hand in hand. To prepare for the effects of climate change, Singapore is currently developing our inaugural National Adaptation Plan (NAP), which is a long-term strategy that outlines actions that we will take with Singaporeans to strengthen our climate resilience," she is quoted in the article as saying.

== Personal life ==
Fu's father, James Fu, was a former leftist journalist who became press secretary to Prime Minister Lee Kuan Yew. Her mother was a nurse. Her grandmother, Liew Yuen Sien, was the principal of Nanyang Girls' High School from 1927 to 1966.

Fu is married to Ivan Lee, a technology entrepreneur; they have three sons.

== Notes ==
Political offices
Preceded by Lim Swee Say; S. Iswaran	Minister in the Prime Minister's Office; 1 August 2012 – 30 September 2015; Served alongside: Lim Swee Say, S. Iswaran, Masagos Zulkifli, Chan Chun Sing	Succeeded by Chan Chun Sing
New office	Minister-in-charge of the Municipal Services Office; 1 October 2014 – present	Incumbent
Preceded by Lawrence Wong	Minister for Community, Culture and Youth; 1 October 2015 – 26 July 2020	Succeeded by Edwin Tong
Preceded by Masagos Zulkifli as Minister for the Environment and Water Resources	Minister for Sustainability and the Environment; 27 July 2020 – present	Incumbent
Preceded by S. Iswaran	Minister-in-charge of Trade Relations; 18 January 2024 – present	Incumbent
Parliament of Singapore
Preceded by Ong Chit Chung; Halimah Yacob; Lim Boon Heng; Tharman Shanmugaratnam; Yu-Foo Yee Shoon	Member of Parliament for Jurong GRC; 2006 – 2011; Served alongside: Ong Chit Chung, Halimah Yacob, Lim Boon Heng, Tharman Shanmugaratnam	Succeeded by David Ong; Halimah Yacob; Ang Wei Neng; Desmond Lee; Tharman Shanmugaratnam
New constituency	Member of Parliament for Yuhua SMC; 2011 – present	Constituency abolished
New constituency	Member of Parliament for Jurong East–Bukit Batok GRC; 2025–present Served alongside: (2025–present): Murali Pillai, David Hoe, Rahayu Mahzam, Lee Hong Chuang	Incumbent
Preceded by Ng Eng Hen	Leader of the House; 1 October 2015 – 23 August 2020	Succeeded by Indranee Rajah
