= 2016 Bukit Batok by-election =

Parliamentary by-election in Singapore

- 7 May 2016
- Registered: 25,727
- Turnout: 24,224 (94.16%) ▼0.08%
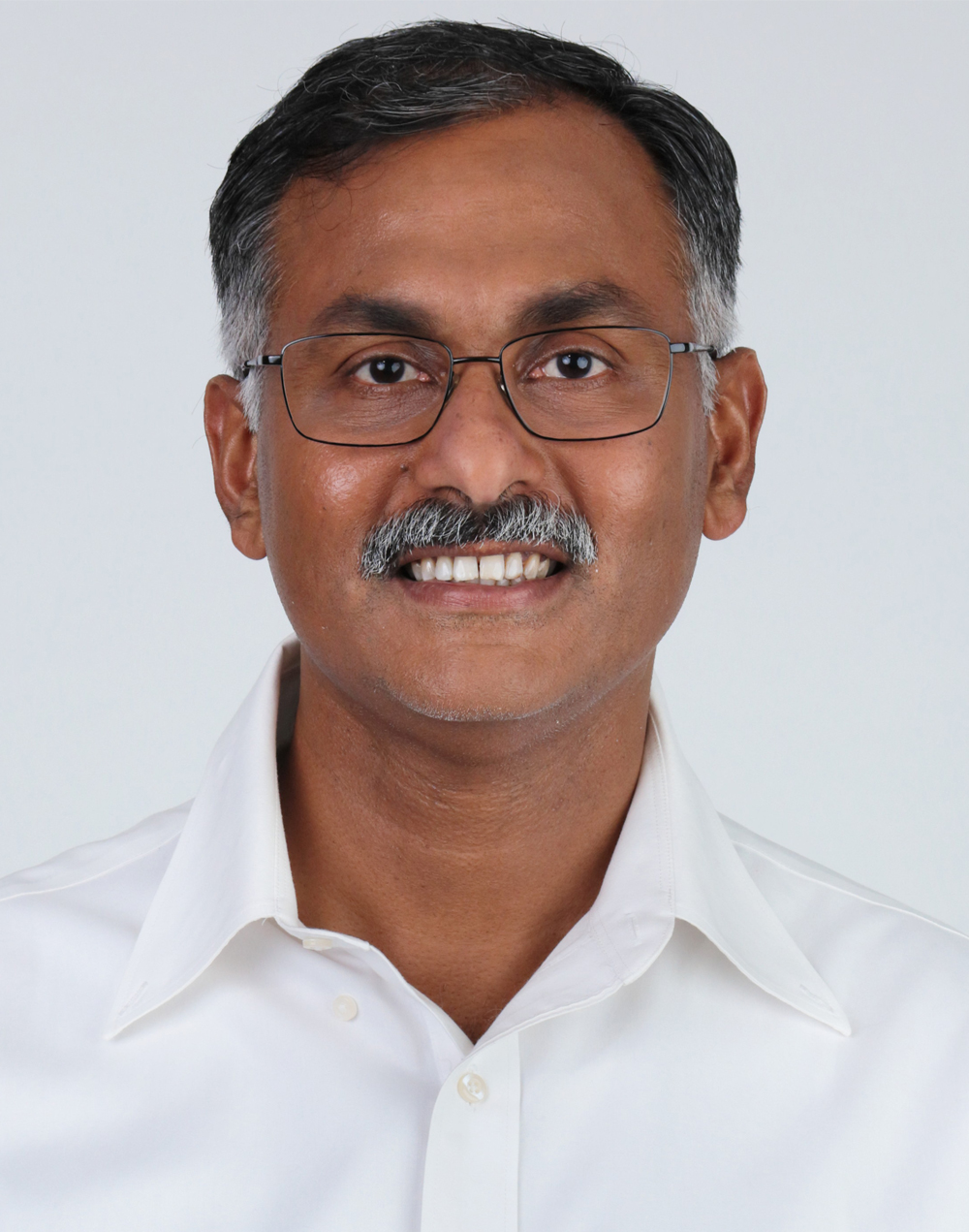

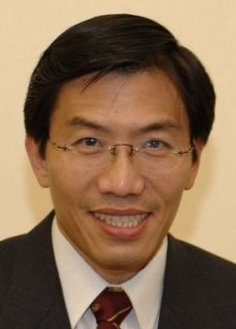
	First party	Second party
Candidate	Murali Pillai	Chee Soon Juan
Party	PAP	SDP
Popular vote	14,428	9,142
Percentage	61.23%	38.77%
Swing	▼11.79%	▲12.39%
MP before election
David Ong
PAP
Elected MP
Murali Pillai
PAP

On 7 May 2016 in Singapore, a parliamentary by-election was held in Bukit Batok Single Member Constituency (SMC) to replace David Ong, the previous Member of Parliament (MP) for the constituency, after he resigned from Parliament and the governing People's Action Party (PAP) following revelations of his extramarital affair. This by-election was the third of its kind in less than five years; two had previously occurred in 2012 and 2013.

On polling day, PAP candidate Murali Pillai defeated Chee Soon Juan, candidate for the Singapore Democratic Party (SDP) with 61.23% of the vote, a negative swing of almost 12%. Murali become the second ethnic minority MP to be elected in an SMC since the GRC's scheme began in 1988, with former Punggol East SMC MP Michael Palmer being its first. Murali was sworn into Parliament two days later. As of the recent general election in 2025, this was the latest by-election being held in Singapore.

== Background ==
On 12 March 2016, David Ong, the incumbent PAP MP for Bukit Batok SMC, suddenly resigned from Parliament and the PAP, citing "personal reasons" and admitting to a "personal indiscretion". His resignation was accepted by Lee Hsien Loong, then-Prime Minister and secretary-general of the PAP. Then-PAP whip Chan Chun Sing stated that the party took "very decisive action" in "a very short time" once it heard of the "indiscretion", due to "standards that the party also [wanted] to uphold". Ong sent a personal letter of apology to Bukit Batok residents in early April 2016.

The Singaporean media stated that Ong had been having an extramarital affair with Wendy Lim, a 41-year-old PAP member and grassroots volunteer. The affair had happened for nearly six months before going public after Lim's husband lodged a complaint; Lim subsequently left the PAP three days later on 15 March while also taking leave from her full-time job as a sales director.

Ong's resignation led to the third by-election within a span of four years, which coincidentally involving an MP resigning over extramaritial affairs. Prior to Ong's case, two other MPs in 2012 also resigned their respective seats for the same reasons and precipated its respective by-elections: the first happened in February with the resignation of Yaw Shin Leong, then-Workers' Party (WP) MP for Hougang SMC, and a by-election was held three months later; the other occurred in December that same year following the resignation of Michael Palmer, then-Speaker of Parliament and PAP MP for Punggol East SMC, which saw a second by-election being held a month later.

Ong's responsibilities as MP for Bukit Batok SMC were tentatively fulfilled by Desmond Lee, incumbent MP for Jurong Group Representation Constituency (GRC) and Senior Minister of State, pending the election of a new MP. Ang Wei Neng, another MP for Jurong GRC, fulfilled his responsibilities as chairperson of Jurong–Clementi Town Council.

=== Calling of by-election ===
After the annual Budget Statement for 2016 was passed, on 20 April, as Prime Minister Lee Hsien Loong was on a working visit to the Middle East at the time, the Deputy Prime Minister Teo Chee Hean, as Acting Prime Minister, advised President Tony Tan to issue the writ of election. The writ was issued, adjourning nominations to 27 April at Keming Primary School (Note: Keming Primary School was coincidentally also the nomination centre for Bukit Batok SMC along with the neighbouring Jurong GRC, West Coast GRC, and Yuhua SMC, in the 2015 general election.) and voting to 7 May.

=== Bukit Batok SMC ===

As of 21 April 2016, there were 25,727 registered voters. They accounted for 56% of the total resident population of Bukit Batok SMC. Approximately 96% of the resident population lived in public housing. Bukit Batok have nine polling stations across the constituency, and ballot boxes were sent to either one of the two counting centers, Keming Primary School and Bukit Batok Secondary School.

== Candidates ==
Two candidates were successfully nominated for this election:

Candidates	Party	Background
Murali Pillai	Peoples Action Party	A member of the PAP, Pillai was the branch secretary for the Bukit Batok division of Jurong GRC under the late MP Ong Chit Chung. Having been the unelected PAP branch chairperson (Note: Another name for a "grassroots advisor", an individual appointed for "grassroots engagement and outreach" in a GRC division or SMC who, according to the People's Association (PA), has to be aligned with the "Government of the day". They do not need to be the elected MP for the area.) for the Paya Lebar division of Aljunied GRC since May 2012, he was part of the five-member PAP team in the 2015 general election that narrowly lost to the WP in said GRC. On 21 March, the PAP announced that Pillai had been nominated as its candidate for Bukit Batok SMC; he was thus appointed branch chairperson there. Outside of politics, he was the head of commercial litigation at Rajah & Tann.
Chee Soon Juan	Singapore Democratic Party	Chee, who was the current Secretary-general of SDP, and a retired neuro-psychologist, was the first candidate to announce his bid for Bukit Batok SMC on 20 March. While it was the first time Chee had contested in Bukit Batok SMC, this was technically the second time Chee had challenged Bukit Batok back in 2001 where said ward was under the boundaries of Jurong GRC at the time, where Chee's team had once challenged.

Three other men had applied for political donation certificates but were not nominated as candidates:

Candidates	Background
Kwan Yue Keng	A former SDP candidate for Bukit Batok SMC in the 1988 and 1991 general elections, Kwan had since become a member of the People's Power Party (PPP). Under an agreement between SDP and PPP to avoid a walkover, Kwan was set as a designated candidate in the event Chee was disqualified. However, Kwan withdrew from the contest after Chee had nominated, and endorsed him.
Abdul Rahim Osman	A former WP candidate for Cheng San GRC in 1997. Despite being applied and had a political donation certificate, he withdrew from the contest after consideration, and endorsed Pillai.
Shirwin Eu	An Uber driver, Eu did not meet the nomination requirements of a proposer, a seconder, and four assentors residing in Bukit Batok SMC. He admitted that he was drawn by the "fame and wealth" of becoming an MP and did not know what residents of the SMC wanted. He had suffered a similar failure during his first bid to be nominated in Bukit Panjang SMC for the 2015 general election.

Five opposition parties, including the PPP, had earlier ruled out contesting in the by-election. The rest were the Democratic Progressive Party (DPP), the Singapore Democratic Alliance (SDA), Singaporeans First (SingFirst), and the WP. Samir Salim Neji, an independent who had contested Bukit Batok SMC during the 2015 general election, also announced that he would not contest.

== Campaign ==
=== Summary of election rallies ===
On Nomination Day, 27 April, the Singapore Police Force issued a list of sites available for rallies ("electoral meetings"). They could be held from 28 April to 5 May between 7am to 10pm. It was also announced that the Speakers' Corner would not serve as an "unrestricted area" during the campaigning period. All rallies below were held between 7pm to 10pm.

Party	29 April	1 May	3 May	5 May
PAP	Bukit Gombak Stadium (Note: Bukit Gombak Stadium was under the boundaries of the neigbouring Chua Chu Kang GRC.)	NA	NA	Bukit Gombak Stadium
SDP	Field along Bukit Batok Industrial Park A	Bukit Gombak Stadium	Field along Bukit Batok Industrial Park A	

=== SDP plans ===
Chee campaigned with a slogan of "Now Is The Time", and his campaign used technology and social media widely. By 21 April, he had put together a team of four to, within the first 100 days of a victory, advise the SDP on how to take over from the PAP and run the new town council for the SMC. Chee also pledged that the SDP wanted "to surpass current levels of performance of PAP-run town councils". By 29 April, the SDP had established a transition team of 13; they were to ensure that said town council "[worked] without a hitch, all from Day One". Chee also stated that he would personally manage the operation of the town council without managing agents, with the SDP aiming "to set new standards for transparency and accountability in town council governance."

The SDP announced on 23 April that, if Chee won, residents of Bukit Batok SMC would be provided with four social schemes:

- Hearts for Bukit Batok, where needy families would be 'adopted' and supported, including with a trust fund. Chee also said that he would use part of his salary as an MP to help 10 families.
- Pathfinder, a program providing youths with books, fairs, and sports, as well as subsidized tuition for the poor.
- Dollars And Sense, a financial clinic.
- Legal Lifeline, a clinic for legal advice.

=== PAP plans ===
On 24 April, Pillai revealed a $1.9 million plan by the PAP-run Jurong–Clementi Town Council, which was managing Bukit Batok SMC, to upgrade infrastructure around Blocks (Note: Public apartments, or flats, as they are called in Singapore, built by the Housing and Development Board (HDB).) 140 to 149 in the SMC, saying, "If we don't have the mandate, then we won't have the ability to carry on because we will not form the town council." In response, Chee criticized pending upgrading plans as a "knee-jerk reaction every time an election [came]" and asked for an update on the $23.6 million upgrading plan for Bukit Batok SMC announced by Ong during the 2015 general election. Pillai replied that some projects in the $23.6 million plan were already "fully executed", while others were ongoing or "in the pipeline"; he also claimed that the $1.9 million upgrade was a component of the plan. Later, after Pillai said that the $1.9 million would be disbursed regardless of the party of the by-election winner; Chee said that he would continue with Ong's masterplan while proposing new additions including zebra crossings and covered walkways.

On 26 April, Pillai unveiled his manifesto focusing on the three domains of employment, social mobility and the elderly. On employment, Pillai proposed a program to help the unemployed find jobs faster. On social mobility, he said that volunteers would "inspire children from low-income families to aim high to succeed in life". A "health cooperative" would be implemented to help "sandwiched families" by increasing medical literacy and subsidizing consumables for the elderly. Additionally, he also proposed an "emergency button scheme" for "elderly living alone" to alert "neighbours or community volunteers" of a need for help. In the following days, Pillai pledged to establish a new eldercare centre to "help provide more therapy services and daycare services". He also elaborated on his initial plans: for social mobility, he stated a hope that his volunteer youth mentorship program would eventually be accessible to all residents and be introduced in schools; while for the unemployed, he planned on "leveraging on community contacts within the pool of community volunteers and Bukit Batok residents, and also [his] own business contacts" to help residents secure jobs. At his final rally, Pillai said that if he were elected, he would propose in Parliament to tighten the criteria for receiving employment passes and raise Eldershield insurance payouts for the disabled.

=== Campaigning ===
On 27 April, Chee pledged that if elected, he would be a "full-time MP", claiming, "...every morning when Mr Murali wakes up, his first destination will be his office. When I wake up every morning, my first destination is Bukit Batok." In response, Pillai said that he would "always put Bukit Batok residents' needs above [his]". He also replied that PAP MPs were able to balance having a "day job" alongside their MP status; while a "team approach" was needed as constituents could not be served by a single person. At the SDP's rally on April 29, several SDP speakers criticized David Ong for his resignation, accusing him of thus failing to serve residents of Bukit Batok SMC; in response, Chee declared that people should "leave Mr Ong alone" and not "kick a man when he's down". The next day, Chee further said that he would "stop" SDP members from attacking Ong for the rest of the by-election period.

On 3 May, Chee claimed that, despite having earlier considered his opponent to be Pillai, they were "turning out to be everybody else except him" while Pillai was "not saying anything"; multiple serving ministers had commented on or responded to Chee during the by-election. Several PAP politicians also questioned Chee's ability to perform the role of an MP, claiming that he had not had a "full-time job" for several years. In response, Chee said, "I've been working every single day to not just keep the SDP together but build it up, and to think and propose and write about ideas for Singapore." Certain other PAP members praised Pillai's character and history in Bukit Batok while questioning Chee's character and his past, resulting in Chee calling for the PAP to cease its "personal attacks" and "stop the gutter politics", and instead focus on policies and issues. In contrast, as of the next day, Pillai had not commented on Chee's character, instead emphasising house visits and in-depth discussions of his proposals with residents.

On 4 May, Chee said that his party's "comparative advantage" would be evident in Parliament, where he could make a "qualitative difference", challenging ministers to "justify their positions" on issues. He accused Singaporean ministers of "[having] not been challenged intellectually", claiming that they were thus able to make "motherhood statements and things that [did] not really make a lot of sense". Amongst the national issues he promised to champion were the Central Provident Fund (CPF), financial assistance for the elderly, fixing and extending the progressional wage system, and retrenchment insurance. On the retrenchment insurance scheme, Chee proposed that employed workers pay a fee for inclusion into the scheme, in exchange for a staggered form of monetary support for the 18 months after retrenchment. Additionally, he said that Singapore needed to "pay a lot more attention" to immigrants for fear that they were "not properly vetted".

=== Cooling-off Day incident ===
On Cooling-off Day, the Media Development Authority (MDA) filed a police report against news website The Middle Ground for its article BB BE: 50 voters in Bukit Batok, which violated one of the regulations under the Parliamentary Elections Act. Elections Department Singapore, on behalf of the Returning Officer, issued a formal notice and take down at 9.30am to have the article removed no later than 3.30pm. On 2 August, the website was issued a "stern warning in-lieu of prosecution" for the infraction.

Under the Parliamentary Elections Act, any publication of the results of any election survey during the election period between the date where the writ is issued until polls closed (in the case of this by-election, between 20 April and 7 May) is strictly forbidden, so are exit polls. Penalties under this clause carries a maximum one year imprisonment or up to a S$1,500 fine, or both.

== Results ==
At around 11.30 pm on Polling Day, 7 May, it was officially announced that Pillai had become the MP-elect for Bukit Batok SMC with 61.23% of the vote, defeating Chee, who received 38.77%.

Four days after Polling Day, 32 of 52 overseas votes cast were compiled. Pillai and Chee received an additional 24 and 8 votes respectively. No spoiled votes were counted.

=== Sample count ===
Similar to the 2015 general election, sample counts were released by the Elections Department prior to the announcement of the official results to prevent unnecessary speculation and reliance on unofficial sources of information while counting is still under way. The sample count results were released at 9:24pm, with Pillai garnering 61% of the vote and Chee with 39%.

By-election 2016: Bukit Batok
Party	Candidate	Votes	%	±%
PAP	K. Muralidharan Pillai	14,452	61.23	▼11.79
SDP	Chee Soon Juan	9,150	38.77	▲12.39
Majority		5,302	22.46	▼24.18
Registered electors		25,727		▼4.99
Total valid votes		23,602	97.43	▼0.43
Rejected ballots		622	2.57	▲0.43
Turnout		24,192	94.03	▼0.21
PAP hold		Swing	▼12.09	
