= Sengkang West Single Member Constituency =

Former constituency in Singapore

Sengkang West
- Former Single Member constituency for the Parliament of Singapore
- Region: North-East Region, Singapore
- Electorate: 47,846

Former constituency
- Created: 2011
- Abolished: 2020
- Seats: 1
- Member: Constituency abolished
- Town Council: Ang Mo Kio
- Created from: Ang Mo Kio GRC
- Replaced by: Ang Mo Kio GRC; Sengkang GRC

Sengkang West Single Member Constituency was a single member constituency (SMC) in the north-eastern region of Singapore. At abolition, it was managed by Ang Mo Kio Town Council.

== History ==
Prior to the 2011 general election, the constituency was formed from the Sengkang West division of Ang Mo Kio Group Representation Constituency (GRC). Lam Pin Min, Member of Parliament (MP) representing the division, stood for election in the SMC; he defeated Koh Choong Yong from the Workers' Party (WP) with 58.1% of the vote.

In 2015, part of the SMC was returned to Ang Mo Kio GRC; Lam won 62.1% of the vote in a rematch against Koh.

For the 2020 general election, the SMC was abolished and split into two parts; one was returned to Ang Mo Kio GRC, the other merged into the newly created Sengkang GRC.

== Member of Parliament ==
Year	Member	Party
Formation
2011	Lam Pin Min	PAP
2015	Lam Pin Min	PAP
Constituency abolished (2020)

== Electoral results ==
Note: The Elections Department does not include rejected votes when calculating the vote shares of candidates. Hence, all candidates' vote shares will total to 100% at any given election (may not appear so in multi-way contests due to rounding).

=== Elections in 2010s ===
General Election 2011: Sengkang West
Party	Candidate	Votes	%
PAP	Lam Pin Min	14,689	58.11
WP	Koh Choong Yong	10,591	41.89
Majority		4,098	16.18
Turnout		25,717	95.70
PAP win (new seat)			

General Election 2015: Sengkang West
Party	Candidate	Votes	%	±%
PAP	Lam Pin Min	17,564	62.11	▲4.00
WP	Koh Choong Yong	10,716	37.89	▼4.00
Majority		6,848	24.18	▲8.00
Rejected ballots		417		
Turnout		28,697	95.28	▼0.42
Registered electors		30,119		
PAP hold		Swing	▲4.00	
