= Bukit Batok Single Member Constituency =

Former electoral division in Singapore

Bukit Batok
- Former Single Member constituency for the Parliament of Singapore
- Region: West Region, Singapore
- Electorate: 29,950

Former constituency
- Created: 1972; 54 years ago
- Abolished: 2025; 1 year ago
- Seats: 1
- Party: People's Action Party
- Member: Constituency abolished
- Town Council: Jurong–Clementi
- Reformed: 2015
- Reformed from: Jurong GRC
- Merged: 1997, 2025
- Merged to: Jurong East–Bukit Batok GRC (2025)

Bukit Batok Single Member Constituency was a single-member constituency (SMC) in western Singapore. At abolition, it was managed by Jurong–Clementi Town Council. The last Member of Parliament (MP) for the constituency was Murali Pillai from the People's Action Party (PAP).

== History ==
Bukit Batok SMC had previously existed as Bukit Batok Constituency from 1972 to 1988, before being renamed Bukit Batok SMC from 1988 to 1997. In 1997, it was merged into Jurong GRC prior to the 1997 Singaporean general election. From 1997 to 2015, Bukit Batok SMC did not exist.

Bukit Batok SMC was reformed prior to the 2015 Singaporean general election. David Ong from the governing People's Action Party (PAP) won the contest for the recreated seat with 73.02 per cent of the votes.

In 2016, Ong resigned after having an extramarital affair with 41 year-old Wendy Lim, who is also a member and grassroots volunteer of the People's Action Party; a by-election was called to replace the empty seat. On 7 May, Murali Pillai from the PAP defeated Singapore Democratic Party (SDP) secretary-genera, Chee Soon Juan with a vote count of 61.2% to 38.8%.

During the 2020 Singaporean general election, Chee contested the seat again against incumbent MP Pillai. Pillai won the contest again with a reduced vote share of 54.80 per cent, a drop of 6.43 per cent.

On 11 March 2025, the Elections Department Singapore updated the electoral divisions for the 2025 general election. Bukit Batok SMC was merged into Jurong East–Bukit Batok GRC.

== Member of Parliament ==
Year	Member	Party
Formation
2015	David Ong	PAP
2016	Murali Pillai	PAP
2020	Murali Pillai	PAP
Constituency abolished (2025)

== Electoral results ==
Note: The Elections Department does not include rejected votes when calculating the vote shares of candidates. Hence, all candidates' vote shares will total to 100% at any given election (may not appear so in multi-way contests due to rounding).

=== Elections in 2010s ===
General Election 2015
Party	Candidate	Votes	%
PAP	David Ong	18,234	73.02
SDP	Sadasivam Veriyah	6,588	26.38
Independent	Samir Salim Neji	150	0.60
Majority		11,646	46.64
Total valid votes		24,972	97.86
Rejected ballots		546	2.14
Turnout		25,517	94.24
Registered electors		27,077	
PAP win (new seat)			

By-election 2016
Party	Candidate	Votes	%	±%
PAP	Murali Pillai	14,452	61.23	▼11.79
SDP	Chee Soon Juan	9,150	38.77	▲12.39
Majority		5,302	22.46	▼24.18
Total valid votes		23,602	97.43	▼0.43
Rejected ballots		622	2.57	▲0.43
Turnout		24,192	94.03	▼0.21
Registered electors		25,727		▼4.99
PAP hold		Swing	▼12.09	

=== Elections in 2020s ===
General Election 2020
Party	Candidate	Votes	%	±%
PAP	Murali Pillai	15,500	54.80	▼6.43
SDP	Chee Soon Juan	12,787	45.20	▲6.43
Majority		2,713	9.60	▼12.86
Total valid votes		28,287	98.15	▲0.72
Rejected ballots		533	1.85	▼0.72
Turnout		28,820	96.23	▲2.04
Registered electors		29,948		▲16.41
PAP hold		Swing	▼6.43	
