= Murali Pillai =

Singaporean politician and lawyer

The Honourable Murali Pillai SC
- മുരളീ പിള്ള
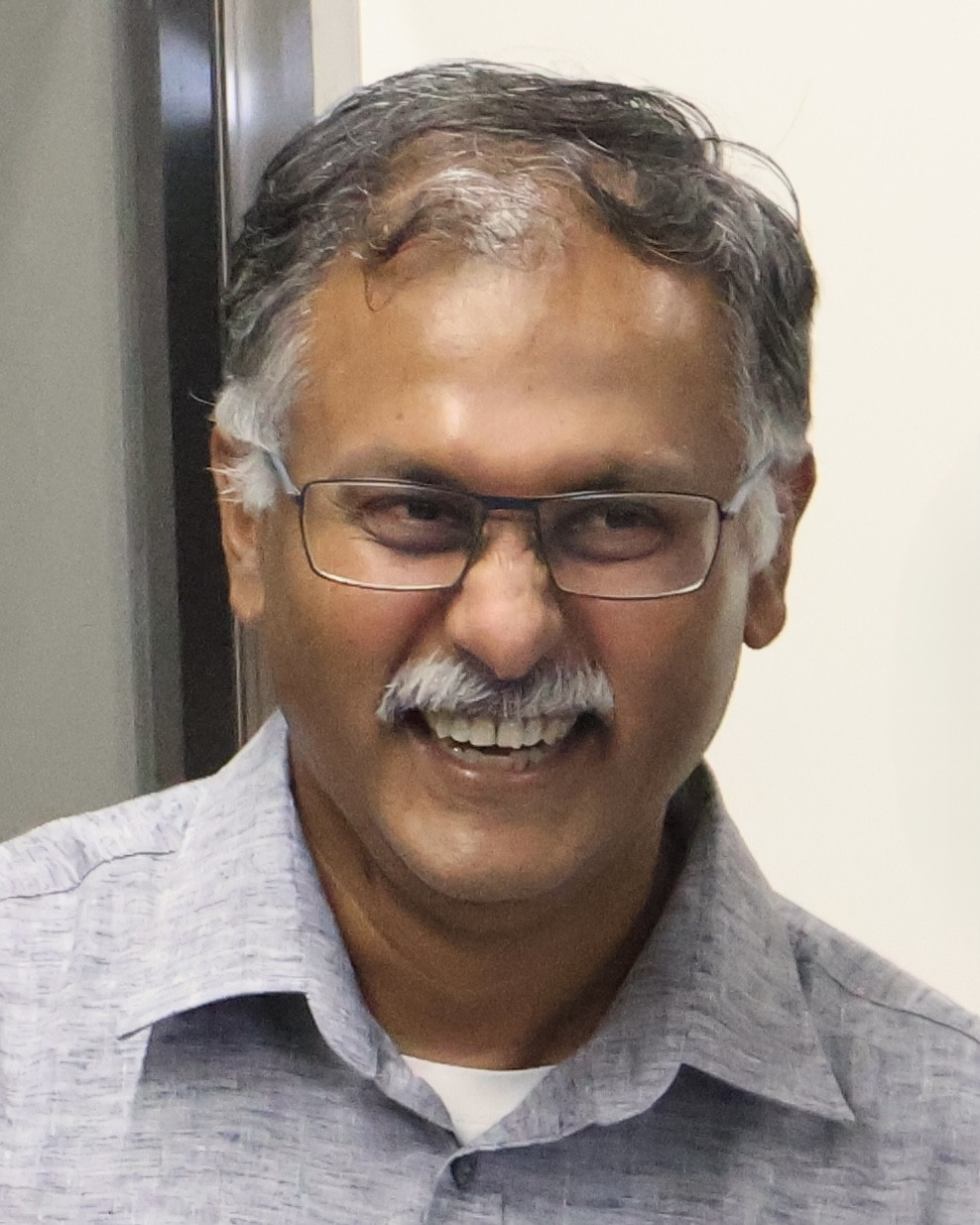
- Pillai in 2025

Member of Parliament for Jurong East–Bukit Batok GRC
- Incumbent
- Assumed office 3 May 2025
- Preceded by: Constituency established
- Majority: 69,350 (53.34%)

Member of Parliament for Bukit Batok SMC
- In office 9 May 2016 – 15 April 2025
- Preceded by: David Ong (PAP)
- Succeeded by: Constituency abolished
- Majority: 2016: 5,302 (24.18%); 2020: 2,713 (12.86%)

Personal details
- Born: Kunjan Muralidharan Pillai; 30 October 1967 (age 59) Singapore
- Party: People's Action Party
- Spouse: N. Gowri
- Children: 4
- Education: National University of Singapore (LLB, LLM, MBA); University of California, Los Angeles (MBA)
- Occupation: Politician; lawyer

Kunjan Muralidharan Pillai (Note: Malayalam: കുഞ്ഞൻ മുരളീധരൻ പിള്ള, romanized: Kuññaṉ Muraḷīdharan Piḷḷa) SC (born 30 October 1967) is a Singaporean politician and lawyer who has been serving as Senior Minister of State for Transport and Senior Minister of State for Law since 2025. A member of the governing People's Action Party (PAP), he has been a Member of Parliament (MP) for the Jurong East–Bukit Batok Group Representation Constituency (GRC) since 2025. He had previously represented Bukit Batok Single Member Constituency (SMC) between 2016 and 2025. He currently co-helms, with Dinesh Vasu Dash, the Indian Engagement and Development Initiative committee tasked with deepening engagement amongst the Singapore Indian community and focusing on areas such as social upliftment, integration and leadership development.

Pillai started his career in the Singapore Police Force (SPF) before becoming a practising lawyer in 1996. Prior to his appointment as Minister of State, Pillai was a partner in the Commercial Litigation practice at Rajah & Tann.

Pillai joined the People's Action Party (PAP) in 2001 and was the branch secretary to Ong Chit Chung, Member of Parliament for Bukit Batok. He was part of a five-member PAP team who contested and narrowly lost to the Workers' Party in Aljunied GRC during the 2015 general election. In 2016, Pillai was once again fielded as a PAP candidate for the Bukit Batok by-election. He won 61.2% of the vote, securing his seat as a Member of Parliament for Bukit Batok SMC.

== Early life and education ==
Pillai was born on 30 October 1967 to P. Kunjan Pillai and Vasanthi Ramadass. The elder Pillai was a trade unionist who was detained from 1963 to 1965 under Operation Coldstore. Pillai is of Malayalee descent, and spoke Malayalam as his mother tongue.

Pillai attended Newton Boys School (which merged into Monk's Hill Primary School), Monk's Hill Secondary School and Hwa Chong Junior College. before graduating from the National University of Singapore with a Bachelor of Laws with honours degree.

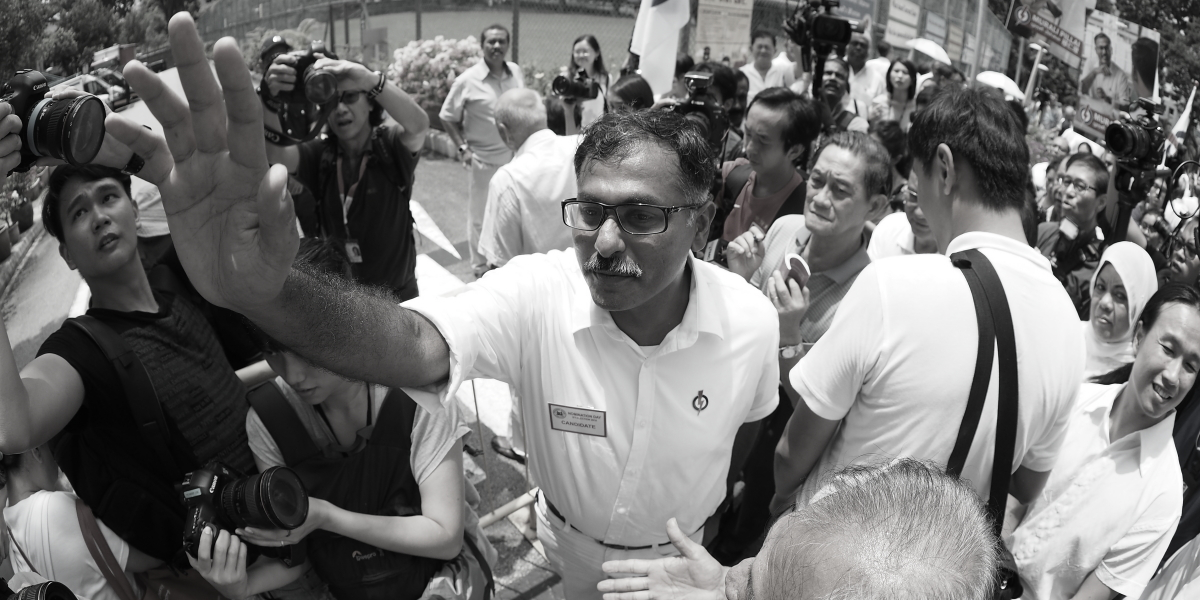
Murali Pillai during the Bukit Batok by-election, 2016 - 20160427

He subsequently went on to complete a Master of Laws degree and Master of Business Administration degree at the National University of Singapore. He also obtained a Master of Business Administration degree from the University of California, Los Angeles.

Pillai played hockey as a student and had represented his school. He was also once President of Raffles Hall in NUS.

== Police and legal career ==
In 1992, Pillai joined the Singapore Police Force as an Assistant Superintendent of Police, primarily involved in investigations into white-collar crimes. He completed his National Service obligations in 2017 as Deputy Superintendent (NS) upon reaching age of 50.

Pillai was called to the Singapore Bar in 1996. In 2014, he defended Choo Wee Khiang, a former PAP Member of Parliament, against his corruption charges.

Pillai was the head of commercial litigation at Rajah & Tann at the time of the 2016 Bukit Batok by-election. He then stepped down from his post in an effort to better balance his work commitments and political responsibilities. He was appointed Senior Counsel in 2020.

== Political career ==
A member of the PAP since 2001, Pillai served from 2007 to 2011 as the branch secretary at PAP's Bukit Batok branch. Then, Pillai served as the branch chairman of PAP's Paya Lebar branch from May 2012 to 2016.

=== 2015 general election ===
Pillai contested the 2015 general election in a PAP team for Aljunied GRC. Although the PAP team was ahead by around 300 votes in Pillai's ward of Paya Lebar within Aljunied GRC, the team gathered only 49.05% of the votes and lost to the team from the Workers' Party which consists of Low Thia Kiang, Pritam Singh, Sylvia Lim, Muhamad Faisal Manap and Chen Show Mao which garnered 50.95% of the votes.

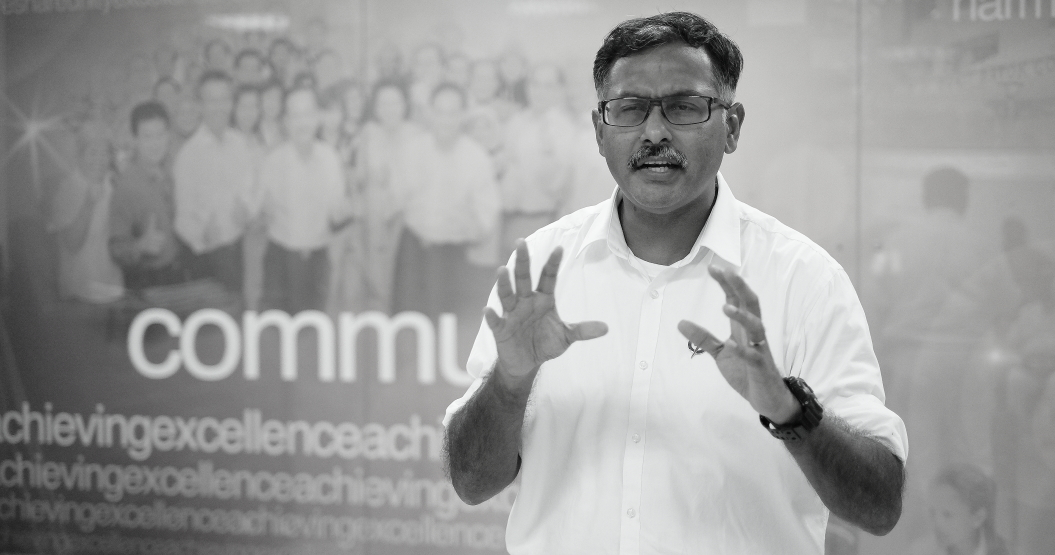
Murali at a rally speech, April 2016

=== 2016 Bukit Batok By-election ===
On 12 March 2016, David Ong, the PAP Member of Parliament for Bukit Batok SMC, resigned, citing a "personal indiscretion". When the PAP announced on 21 March 2016 that Pillai would be their representative for the 2016 Bukit Batok by-election, Pillai was appointed branch chairman of PAP's Bukit Batok branch. Pillai was formally nominated as a candidate on 27 April 2016, the only other nominated candidate being Chee Soon Juan of the SDP.

During his campaign, Pillai chose the Mandarin nickname of "Ah-Mu" (阿穆). He pledged that if he won, he would upgrade infrastructure around Blocks 140 to 149 of the SMC, which would cost S$1.9 million. Pillai later clarified that this potential S$1.9 million project is "part of" the S$23.6 million masterplan announced by David Ong during the 2015 general election.

Pillai's campaign manifesto focused on three domains: jobs, social mobility and the elderly.

Pillai defeated the Singapore Democratic Party's candidate Chee Soon Juan and secured 61.21% of the votes to win the Bukit Batok by-election on polling day. He was sworn into parliament on 9 May 2016.

After the 2018 cabinet reshuffle, Pillai was appointed Chairperson of Home Affairs and Law Government Parliamentary Committee (GPC) in the 14th Parliament. He continued to serve as Chairman until 1 July 2024 where he relinquished the Chairmanship to Zhulkarnain Abdul Rahim after taking office as Minister of State.

In 2019, Pillai, and Tin Pei Ling, asked in Parliament whether MediShield Life provides adequate coverage for citizens.

=== 2020 general election ===
On 30 June 2020, after submitting his nomination papers for the election, Pillai claimed on social media that there was an online attack against his son, who was convicted of an offence. It was alleged that it was a deliberate attack on his candidacy. Chee, his election opponent from SDP, criticised the attack, noting that while they had political differences, this should not degenerate into smears against candidates or family members.

During the campaign period, Pillai was criticised by Chee Soon Juan from the Singapore Democratic Party for the fulfilment, delays, and safety issues in his constituency projects. Pillai was also publicly criticised by one of his constituents on Facebook for being unempathetic to her housing issues, suggesting to her that marriage was the solution to her issues. Pillai won the election with 54.80% of the valid votes.

During the COVID-19 pandemic, Pillai was criticised by Chee for allowing a gathering of seniors to take place. Pillai attended the event in his position as the adviser to Bukit Batok's Grassroots Organisations. Pillai defended against the criticism by saying that precautions were in place for the dinner.

On 13 May 2024, it was announced that Pillai was appointed to minister of state in the Ministry of Law and Ministry of Transport, an appointment that he would only take on from 1 July 2024. He resigned from Rajah & Tann on the effective date of the appointment. He is one of two backbenchers promoted to a full-time political office in that announcement, the other being Shawn Huang. On the appointment, Pillai noted that his decision to go into politics full-time was "motivated by a sense of duty", and he only did so after getting the support of his family and wife.

=== 2025 general election ===
Pillai contested in the 2025 general election in a PAP team for Jurong East–Bukit Batok GRC. On 3 May 2025, the team were duly elected after securing 76.66 percent of the vote in the area against Red Dot United. In the course of the election campaigning, Pillai warned against populism and polarization in society from politics. In August 2025, Pillai was appointed to spearhead a new committee seeking to strengthen the Singapore Indian community, and serves as an advisor for another committee seeking to strengthen the community's identity and its youth.

== Personal life ==
Pillai married his wife, N. Gowri, in 1996. Gowri is a teacher. The couple have twin sons and two daughters.

== Notes ==
Parliament of Singapore
Preceded by David Ong	Member of Parliament for Bukit Batok SMC; 2016 – 2025	Constituency abolished
New constituency	Member of Parliament for Jurong East–Bukit Batok GRC); 2025 – present Served alongside: (2025 – present): Rahayu Mahzam, David Hoe, Lee Hong Chuang, Grace Fu	Incumbent
