= Yuhua Single Member Constituency =

Electoral division in Singapore

Yuhua
- Former single-member constituency for the Parliament of Singapore
- Region: West Region, Singapore
- Electorate: 21,351

Former constituency
- Created: 1984; 42 years ago
- Abolished: 2025; 1 year ago
- Seats: 1
- Member: Constituency abolished
- Town Council: Jurong–Clementi
- Merged: 1997
- Merged to: Bukit Timah GRC (1997); Jurong East–Bukit Batok GRC (2025)
- Reformed: 2011
- Reformed from: Jurong GRC

The Yuhua Single Member Constituency was a single-member constituency (SMC) in western Singapore. At abolition, it was managed by Jurong–Clementi Town Council.

== History ==
Yuhua SMC was dissolved and merged into Jurong East–Bukit Batok Group Representation Constituency (GRC) for the 2025 general election.

== Members of Parliament ==
Year	Member	Party
Formation
1984	Yu-Foo Yee Shoon	PAP
1988	Yu-Foo Yee Shoon	PAP
1991	Yu-Foo Yee Shoon	PAP
Constituency abolished (1997 – 2011)
2011	Grace Fu	PAP
2015	Grace Fu	PAP
2020	Grace Fu	PAP
Constituency abolished (2025)

== Electoral results ==
Note: The Elections Department does not include rejected votes when calculating the vote shares of candidates. Hence, all candidates' vote shares will total to 100% at any given election (may not appear so in multi-way contests due to rounding).

=== Elections in 1980s ===
General Election 1984
Party	Candidate	Votes	%	±%
PAP	Yu-Foo Yee Shoon	9,551	61.4	N/A
SDP	Lim Ah Yong	5,996	38.6	N/A
Majority		3,555	22.80	N/A
Turnout		15,897	97.7	N/A
PAP win (new seat)				

General Election 1988: Yuhua
Party	Candidate	Votes	%	±%
PAP	Yu-Foo Yee Shoon	11,497	63.0	▲1.6
SDP	Toh Kim Kiat	6,765	37.0	▼1.6
Majority		4,732	26.0	▲3.2
Turnout		18,616	97.0	▼0.7
PAP hold		Swing	▲1.6	

=== Elections in 1990s ===
General Election 1991: Yuhua
Party	Candidate	Votes	%	±%
PAP	Yu-Foo Yee Shoon	9,945	56.2	▼6.8
SDP	Toh Kim Kiat	7,762	43.8	▲6.8
Majority		2,183	12.4	▼13.6
Turnout		18,797	96.5	▼0.5
PAP hold		Swing	▼6.8	

=== Elections in 2010s ===
General Election 2011: Yuhua
Party	Candidate	Votes	%	±%
PAP	Grace Fu	14,093	66.9	N/A
SDP	Teo Soh Lung	6,986	33.1	N/A
Majority		7,107	33.8	N/A
Turnout		21,609	93.1	N/A
PAP win (new seat)				

General Election 2015: Yuhua
Party	Candidate	Votes	%	±%
PAP	Grace Fu	15,324	73.55	▲6.64
SDP	Jaslyn Go Hui Leng	5,512	26.45	▼6.64
Majority		9,812	47.10	
Rejected ballots		390	1.8	-
Turnout		21,226	93.8	
Registered electors		22,617		
PAP hold		Swing	▲6.6	

=== Elections in 2020s ===
General Election 2020
Party	Candidate	Votes	%	±%
PAP	Grace Fu	14,131	70.54	▼3.01
SDP	Robin Low	5,901	29.46	▲3.01
Majority		8,230	41.08	▼6.02
Total valid votes		20,032	98.01	▼0.19
Rejected ballots		406	1.99	▲0.19
Turnout		20,438	95.72	▲1.92
Registered electors		21,351		
PAP hold		Swing	▼3.01	
