= David Ong =

Singaporean politician

David Ong Kim Huat
- 王金发

Member of the Singapore Parliament for Bukit Batok SMC
- In office 11 September 2015 – 12 March 2016
- Preceded by: Constituency established
- Succeeded by: Murali Pillai

Member of the Singapore Parliament for Jurong GRC
- In office 7 May 2011 – 25 August 2015
- Preceded by: PAP held
- Succeeded by: PAP held

Personal details
- Born: 19 May 1961 (age 65) State of Singapore
- Other political affiliations: People's Action Party (2008–2016)
- Education: University of Oregon

David Ong Kim Huat (Chinese: 王金发; pinyin: Wáng Jīnfā; born 19 May 1961) is a Singaporean former politician. A former member of the governing People's Action Party (PAP), he was the Member of Parliament (MP) for the Bukit Batok division of Jurong Group Representation Constituency (GRC) between 2011 and 2015 and Bukit Batok Single Member Constituency (SMC) between 2015 and 2016.

Ong resigned from Parliament and the PAP in 2016.

== Early life and education ==
Ong was born in Singapore on 19 May 1961, to a police officer and his wife, a homemaker. He grew up in a small housing flat in Queenstown and attended Margaret Drive Primary School and Gan Eng Seng School. Ong graduated from Tanjong Katong Secondary Technical School in 1979, going on to obtain a degree from the University of Oregon in 1986.

== Career ==
Ong began his professional career in 1986 at CL Computers, which he left in 1989 to join American Express. In 1992, Ong crossed over to Visa International, followed by Reed Elsevier in 1995, and Planet Marketing in 1997, where he stayed on till 2007. From 2001 to 2007, Ong also worked at Publicis Groupe.

Ong started RedDot Publishing Inc. which specializes in providing media solutions for the tourism industry. He was Regional Marketing Director for Visa International before he founded an integrated marketing consultancy agency which was acquired by Publicis Groupe in 2002.

Since 2007, he has been serving as RedDot Publishing's managing director. He is also the Patron of the Singapore Brain Tumor Society and advisor to Singapore Eng Choon Clan.

=== Politics ===
Since 1999, Ong served as a grassroots leader in Kreta Ayer–Kim Seng Division. He was the chairman of its Citizens’ Consultative Committee from 2005 to 2011. Ong was appointed a district councillor of the Central Singapore Community Development Council (CDC) in 2004. He chaired the CDC's Networks Committee that is responsible for fostering deeper collaboration with stakeholders to better meet the community's needs. Between 2006 and 2010, Ong was a member of the REACH Supervisory Panel. In January 2010, he was appointed chairman of People's Association Active Ageing Council. He was also a member of the ITE College Central Advisory Committee. Ong was also the vice chairman of the Government Parliamentary Committee (GPC) for Culture, Community and Youth and member of the GPC for Communication and Information. Ong was also the vice chairman of Southwest Community Development Council and president of Basketball Association of Singapore. He is a Member of PAP Community Foundation's executive committee as well as the National Trade Union Congress U-Care Fund Board of Trustees.

Ong served previously as a Member of Parliament for the Jurong GRC from 2011 to 2015, as well as the chairman of the Jurong Town Council. Ong was the vice chairman of Ministry of Culture, Community, and Youth's Government Parliamentary Committee (GPC) as well a member of the Ministry of Communications and Information (MCI) GPC.

On 12 March 2016, Ong resigned from both party and parliament due to "personal indiscretion". The explanation offered by the Singapore media is that Ong was having an extra marital affair with 41 year-old Wendy Lim, who is also a member and grassroots volunteer of the People's Action Party. Ong's alleged affair went on for around six months before it went public after Lim's husband lodged a complaint about it. Ong's sudden retirement triggered the Bukit Batok by-election which took place on 7 May 2016.

== Personal life ==
Ong is married with three children.

== See also ==
- List of Singapore MPs
