= List of Singaporean town councils =

In Singapore, a town douncil (TC) is an administrative body led by one or more elected Members of Parliament^{(→)} (MPs) together with appointed residents. It is responsible for managing the common property and overseeing the day-to-day maintenance of public housing estates built by the Housing and Development Board (HDB) within a designated town.

Currently, there are 19 town councils in Singapore following the 2025 general election, all of which took effect before 1 August 2025. For the first time since 2011, one TC (Jalan Kayu) manages a standalone single-member constituency (SMC); each of the rest manages a group representation constituency (GRC) and 0–2 SMCs. Four existing TCs were renamed to reflect the renaming of their GRCs: Jurong–Clementi–Bukit Batok, Marine Parade–Braddell Heights, Pasir Ris–Changi and West Coast–Jurong West. The opposition-held Aljunied-Hougang Town Council was also transferred from the North East CDC to South East CDC, making it the first time since 2006 an existing town council have a change in their CDC.

Town council (acronym)	Seats	Constituencies	Electorate (2025)		CDC	Chairperson
Town council (acronym)	Seats	Constituencies	Constituency	Town council	CDC	Chairperson
Aljunied–Hougang (AHTC)	6	Aljunied GRC	144,276	173,742	South East	Gerald Giam
Aljunied–Hougang (AHTC)	6	Hougang SMC	29,466	173,742	South East	Gerald Giam
Ang Mo Kio (AMKTC)	7	Ang Mo Kio GRC	161,494	209,149	Central	Henry Kwek
Ang Mo Kio (AMKTC)	7	Kebun Baru SMC	22,251	209,149	Central	Henry Kwek
Ang Mo Kio (AMKTC)	7	Yio Chu Kang SMC	25,404	209,149	Central	Henry Kwek
Bishan–Toa Payoh (BTPTC)	5	Bishan–Toa Payoh GRC	98,679	121,943	Central	Gan Siow Huang
Bishan–Toa Payoh (BTPTC)	5	Marymount SMC	23,264	121,943	Central	Gan Siow Huang
Chua Chu Kang (CCKTC)	5	Chua Chu Kang GRC	93,512	119,930	South West	Low Yen Ling
Chua Chu Kang (CCKTC)	5	Bukit Gombak SMC	26,418	119,930	South West	Low Yen Ling
East Coast (ECTC)	5	East Coast GRC	151,024	151,024	South East	Jessica Tan
Holland–Bukit Panjang (HBPTC)	5	Holland–Bukit Timah GRC	123,169	156,763	North West	Liang Eng Hwa
Holland–Bukit Panjang (HBPTC)	5	Bukit Panjang SMC	33,594	156,763	North West	Liang Eng Hwa
Jalan Besar (JBTC)	5	Jalan Besar GRC	106,327	137,286	Central	Wan Rizal
Jalan Besar (JBTC)	5	Potong Pasir SMC	30,959	137,286	Central	Wan Rizal
Jalan Kayu (JKTC)	1	Jalan Kayu SMC	29,620	29,620	Central	Ng Chee Meng
Jurong–Clementi–Bukit Batok (JCBBTC)	6	Jurong East–Bukit Batok GRC	142,728	172,397	South West	Xie Yao Quan
Jurong–Clementi–Bukit Batok (JCBBTC)	6	Jurong Central SMC	29,669	172,397	South West	Xie Yao Quan
Marine Parade–Braddell Heights (MPBHTC)	6	Marine Parade–Braddell Heights GRC	131,789	154,620	South East	Tin Pei Ling
Marine Parade–Braddell Heights (MPBHTC)	6	Mountbatten SMC	22,831	154,620	South East	Tin Pei Ling
Marsiling–Yew Tee (MYTTC)	4	Marsiling–Yew Tee GRC	119,516	119,516	North West	Alex Yam
Nee Soon (NSTC)	5	Nee Soon GRC	151,836	151,836	North West	Goh Hanyan
Pasir Ris–Changi (PRCTC)	4	Pasir Ris–Changi GRC	100,706	100,706	North East	Sharael Taha
Punggol (PTC)	4	Punggol GRC	123,778	123,778	North East	Sun Xueling
Sembawang (SBTC)	6	Sembawang GRC	134,103	158,309	North West	Gabriel Lam
Sembawang (SBTC)	6	Sembawang West SMC	24,206	158,309	North West	Gabriel Lam
Sengkang (SKTC)	4	Sengkang GRC	126,808	126,808	North East	He Ting Ru
Tampines (TTC)	6	Tampines GRC	148,098	172,130	North East	Baey Yam Keng
Tampines (TTC)	6	Tampines Changkat SMC	24,032	172,130	North East	Baey Yam Keng
Tanjong Pagar (TPTC)	7	Tanjong Pagar GRC	140,075	194,539	Central	Melvin Yong
Tanjong Pagar (TPTC)	7	Queenstown SMC	28,905	194,539	Central	Melvin Yong
Tanjong Pagar (TPTC)	7	Radin Mas SMC	25,559	194,539	Central	Melvin Yong
West Coast–Jurong West (WCJWTC)	6	West Coast–Jurong West GRC	158,817	184,012	South West	Hamid Razak
West Coast–Jurong West (WCJWTC)	6	Pioneer SMC	25,195	184,012	South West	Hamid Razak

== Past town councils ==
=== 1986–1988 ===
Three TCs were set up on 1 September 1986 as pilot projects for the town council scheme.

Town council	Constituencies	Electorate (1984)	
Town council	Constituencies	Constituency	Town council
Ang Mo Kio East	Cheng San	17,328	62,989
Ang Mo Kio East	Chong Boon	20,650	62,989
Ang Mo Kio East	Jalan Kayu	25,011	62,989
Ang Mo Kio South	Ang Mo Kio	14,633	46,276
Ang Mo Kio South	Bo Wen	14,777	46,276
Ang Mo Kio South	Teck Ghee	16,866	46,276
Ang Mo Kio West	Kebun Baru	17,542	61,173
Ang Mo Kio West	Nee Soon	26,897	61,173
Ang Mo Kio West	Yio Chu Kang	16,734	61,173

=== 1988–1991 ===
A total of 27 TCs were set up in three phases from 1988 to 1991. GRCs were first created during the 1988 general election; constituencies with one Member of Parliament (MP) were renamed single-member constituencies.

==== Phase 1 ====
Town council	Constituencies	Electorate (1988)	
Town council	Constituencies	Constituency	Town council
Aljunied	Aljunied GRC	65,351	82,414
Aljunied	MacPherson SMC	17,063	82,414
Ang Mo Kio Town	Ang Mo Kio SMC	14,633	30,143
Ang Mo Kio Town	Teck Ghee SMC	15,510	30,143
Ang Mo Kio West	Kebun Baru SMC	22,515	38,506
Ang Mo Kio West	Yio Chu Kang SMC	15,991	38,506
Bedok	Bedok GRC	54,969	89,503
Bedok	Changi SMC	17,145	89,503
Bedok	Fengshan SMC	17,389	89,503
Bukit Batok	Bukit Batok SMC	24,138	68,987
Bukit Batok	Bukit Gombak SMC	25,221	68,987
Bukit Batok	Chua Chu Kang SMC	19,628	68,987
Cheng San	Cheng San GRC	56,352	56,352
Potong Pasir	Potong Pasir SMC	19,852	19,852
Redhill	Bukit Merah SMC	14,723	55,296
Redhill	Leng Kee SMC	21,964	55,296
Redhill	Telok Blangah SMC	18,609	55,296
Tiong Bahru	Tiong Bahru GRC	58,898	77,939
Tiong Bahru	Tanjong Pagar SMC	19,041	77,939

==== Phase 2 ====
Town council	Constituencies	Electorate (1988)	
Town council	Constituencies	Constituency	Town council
Brickworks	Brickworks GRC	43,117	43,117
Bukit Panjang	Bukit Panjang SMC	33,824	33,824
Eunos	Eunos GRC	75,723	75,723
Hong Kah	Hong Kah GRC	67,431	67,431
Jalan Besar	Jalan Besar GRC	54,941	76,186
Jalan Besar	Kallang SMC	21,245	76,186
Jurong East	Ayer Rajah SMC	22,532	61,944
Jurong East	Bukit Timah SMC	20,222	61,944
Jurong East	Yuhua SMC	19,190	61,944
Marine Parade	Marine Parade GRC	62,385	98,782
Marine Parade	Mountbatten SMC	17,747	98,782
Marine Parade	Siglap SMC	18,650	98,782
Toa Payoh	Toa Payoh GRC	49,243	65,093
Toa Payoh	Kim Keat SMC	15,850	65,093
Yishun	Nee Soon Central SMC	24,403	46,945
Yishun	Nee Soon South SMC	22,542	46,945

==== Phase 3 ====
Town council	Constituencies	Electorate (1988)	
Town council	Constituencies	Constituency	Town council
Bishan–Serangoon	Serangoon Gardens SMC		
Bishan–Serangoon	Thomson SMC		
City Centre	Kampong Glam SMC		
City Centre	Kim Seng SMC		
City Centre	Kreta Ayer SMC		
Holland			
Hougang	Hougang SMC		
Hougang	Punggol SMC		
Jurong	Boon Lay SMC		
Jurong	Jurong SMC		
Pasir Panjang	Pasir Panjang GRC		
Sembawang	Sembawang GRC		
Tampines	Tampines GRC		
Whampoa	Whampoa SMC		

start temporary reference

- Bishan Serangoon (Serangoon Gardens SMC, Thomson SMC)
- City Centre (Kreta Ayer SMC, Kim Seng SMC, Kampong Glam SMC)
- Holland
- Hougang
- Jurong
- Pasir Panjang
- Sembawang (Sembawang GRC)
- Tampines
- Whampoa

end temporary reference

=== 1991–1997 ===
After the 1991 general election, the number of TCs was reduced to 23.

- Aljunied
- Ang Mo Kio-Yishun (Ang Mo Kio until 1993)
- Bedok
- Bishan-Serangoon
- Brickworks
- Bukit Batok
- Bukit Gombak
- Cheng San
- City Centre
- Eunos-Pasir Ris (Eunos until 1995)
- Holland
- Hong Kah
- Hougang
- Jalan Besar
- Jurong
- Jurong East
- Marine Parade
- Nee Soon Central
- Sembawang
- Tampines
- Tanjong Pagar (Tiong Bahru until 1991)
- Toa Payoh
- Yishun (merged with Ang Mo Kio in 1993)

=== 1997–2001 ===
After the 1997 general election, the number of TCs was further reduced to 14. For the first time, Community Development Councils (CDCs) were established by the People's Association Act (CDC Rules & Regulations 1997), with the official reason being to promote cohesion and self-resilience among the electorate. During the period, there were nine CDCs, including Central Singapore and North East, which would later nominally survive a simplification of the CDC system.

Town council	Seats	Constituencies	Electorate (1997)		CDC
Town council	Seats	Constituencies	Constituency	Town council	CDC
Aljunied	5	Aljunied GRC	103,466	103,466	North East
Ang Mo Kio	6	Ang Mo Kio GRC	125,344	125,344	Ang Mo Kio–Cheng San
Bishan–Toa Payoh	5	Bishan–Toa Payoh GRC	122,256	122,256	Central Singapore
Bukit Timah	7	Bukit Timah GRC	118,248	164,347	Bukit Timah
Bukit Timah	7	Ayer Rajah SMC	22,025	164,347	Bukit Timah
Bukit Timah	7	Chua Chu Kang SMC	24,074	164,347	Bukit Timah
Cheng San	5	Cheng San GRC	103,323	103,323	Ang Mo Kio–Cheng San
City Centre	5	Kreta Ayer–Tanglin GRC	75,126	95,170	Central Singapore
City Centre	5	Kampong Glam SMC	20,044	95,170	Central Singapore
East Coast	6	East Coast GRC	142,201	142,201	Marine Parade
Hong Kah	7	Hong Kah GRC	125,452	170,375	Sembawang–Hong Kah
Hong Kah	7	Boon Lay SMC	20,014	170,375	Sembawang–Hong Kah
Hong Kah	7	Bukit Gombak SMC	24,909	170,375	Sembawang–Hong Kah
Jalan Besar	5	Jalan Besar GRC	71,922	71,922	Central Singapore
Marine Parade	7	Marine Parade GRC	142,106	162,840	Marine Parade
Marine Parade	7	MacPherson SMC	20,734	162,840	Marine Parade
Pasir Ris	4	Pasir Ris GRC	85,908	85,908	North East
Sembawang	7	Sembawang GRC	154,402	180,659	Sembawang–Hong Kah
Sembawang	7	Nee Soon Central SMC	26,257	180,659	Sembawang–Hong Kah
Tampines	5	Tampines GRC	94,476	94,476	North East
Tanjong Pagar–West Coast	10	Tanjong Pagar GRC	141,520	215,542	Tanjong Pagar
Tanjong Pagar–West Coast	10	West Coast GRC	74,022	215,542	Tanjong Pagar

=== 2001–2006 ===
After the 2001 general election, the number of town councils became 16. CDCs were simplified into five regions. The CDCs of Central Singapore and North East were retained in name, while the other seven were formally abolished in favour of North West, South East and South West.

Town council	Seats	Constituencies	Electorate (2001)		CDC
Town council	Seats	Constituencies	Constituency	Town council	CDC
Aljunied	5	Aljunied GRC	125,115	125,115	North East
Ang Mo Kio	6	Ang Mo Kio GRC	166,644	166,644	Central Singapore
Bishan–Toa Payoh	5	Bishan–Toa Payoh GRC	114,621	114,621	Central Singapore
East Coast	6	East Coast GRC	144,012	165,757	South East
East Coast	6	Joo Chiat SMC	21,745	165,757	South East
Holland–Bukit Panjang	5	Holland–Bukit Panjang GRC	118,834	118,834	North West
Hong Kah	6	Hong Kah GRC	129,073	153,936	South West
Hong Kah	6	Chua Chu Kang SMC	24,863	153,936	South West
Hougang	1	Hougang SMC	23,303	23,303	North East
Jalan Besar	5	Jalan Besar GRC	100,268	100,268	Central Singapore
Jurong	6	Jurong GRC	115,113	142,064	South West
Jurong	6	Bukit Timah SMC	26,951	142,064	South West
Marine Parade	7	Marine Parade GRC	140,174	162,184	South East
Marine Parade	7	MacPherson SMC	22,010	162,184	South East
Pasir Ris–Punggol	5	Pasir Ris-Punggol GRC	134,151	134,151	North East
Potong Pasir		Potong Pasir SMC	16,594	16,594	South East
Sembawang	8	Sembawang GRC	166,137	217,577	North West
Sembawang	8	Nee Soon Central SMC	22,975	217,577	North West
Sembawang	8	Nee Soon East SMC	28,465	217,577	North West
Tampines	5	Tampines GRC	125,432	125,432	North East
Tanjong Pagar	6	Tanjong Pagar GRC	141,150	141,150	Central Singapore
West Coast–Ayer Rajah	6	West Coast GRC	110,779	129,254	South West
West Coast–Ayer Rajah	6	Ayer Rajah SMC	18,475	129,254	South West

=== 2006–2011 ===
After the 2006 general election, the number of town councils remained at 16. The opposition-held Potong Pasir Town Council was transferred from South East CDC to Central CDC.

Town council	Seats	Constituencies	Electorate (2006)		CDC
Town council	Seats	Constituencies	Constituency	Town council	CDC
Aljunied	5	Aljunied GRC	145,141	145,141	North East
Ang Mo Kio-Yio Chu Kang	7	Ang Mo Kio GRC	159,872	184,944	Central Singapore
Ang Mo Kio-Yio Chu Kang	7	Yio Chu Kang SMC	25,072	184,944	Central Singapore
Bishan-Toa Payoh	5	Bishan-Toa Payoh GRC	115,323	115,323	Central Singapore
East Coast	6	East Coast GRC	116,653	138,511	South East
East Coast	6	Joo Chiat SMC	21,858	138,511	South East
Holland-Bukit Panjang	6	Holland-Bukit Timah GRC	118,155	148,607	North West
Holland-Bukit Panjang	6	Bukit Panjang SMC	30,452	148,607	North West
Hong Kah	6	Hong Kah GRC	144,677	169,652	South West
Hong Kah	6	Chua Chu Kang SMC	24,975	169,652	South West
Hougang	1	Hougang SMC	23,759	23,759	North East
Jalan Besar	5	Jalan Besar GRC	93,025	93,025	Central Singapore
Jurong	5	Jurong GRC	116,636	116,636	South West
Marine Parade	7	Marine Parade GRC	155,149	176,190	South East
Marine Parade	7	MacPherson SMC	21,041	176,190	South East
Pasir Ris–Punggol	6	Pasir Ris-Punggol GRC	178,443	178,443	North East
Potong Pasir	1	Potong Pasir SMC	15,888	15,888	Central Singapore
Sembawang	8	Sembawang GRC	184,804	240,542	North West
Sembawang	8	Nee Soon Central SMC	23,152	240,542	North West
Sembawang	8	Nee Soon East SMC	32,586	240,542	North West
Tampines	5	Tampines GRC	126,163	126,163	North East
Tanjong Pagar	6	Tanjong Pagar GRC	148,141	148,141	Central Singapore
West Coast-Ayer Rajah	5	West Coast GRC	137,739	137,739	South West

=== 2011–2013 ===
After the 2011 general election, the number of town councils became 15. Sembawang and West Coast–Ayer Rajah TCs were respectively renamed to Sembawang–Nee Soon and West Coast. Aljunied GRC, which had been newly won by the Workers' Party (WP), and Hougang SMC, already held by the party, had their TCs merged under the name Aljunied–Hougang.

Town council	Seats	Constituencies	Electorate (2011)		CDC
Town council	Seats	Constituencies	Constituency	Town council	CDC
Aljunied-Hougang	6	Aljunied GRC	143,148	167,708	North East
Aljunied-Hougang	6	Hougang SMC	24,560	167,708	North East
Ang Mo Kio	7	Ang Mo Kio GRC	179,071	205,953	Central Singapore
Ang Mo Kio	7	Sengkang West SMC	26,882	205,953	Central Singapore
Bishan-Toa Payoh	5	Bishan-Toa Payoh GRC	122,492	122,492	Central Singapore
Chua Chu Kang	6	Chua Chu Kang GRC	158,648	214,856	South West
Chua Chu Kang	6	Hong Kah North SMC	27,701	214,856	South West
East Coast	6	East Coast GRC	120,324	142,393	South East
East Coast	6	Joo Chiat SMC	22,069	142,393	South East
Holland-Bukit Panjang	5	Holland-Bukit Timah GRC	91,607	124,660	North West
Holland-Bukit Panjang	5	Bukit Panjang SMC	33,053	124,660	North West
Jurong	6	Jurong GRC	125,276	148,475	South West
Jurong	6	Yuhua SMC	23,199	148,475	South West
Marine Parade	6	Marine Parade GRC	154,451	178,182	South East
Marine Parade	6	Mountbatten SMC	23,731	178,182	South East
Moulmein-Kallang	5	Moulmein-Kallang GRC	87,595	109,226	Central Singapore
Moulmein-Kallang	5	Whampoa SMC	21,631	109,226	Central Singapore
Pasir Ris–Punggol	7	Pasir Ris-Punggol GRC	168,971	202,252	North East
Pasir Ris–Punggol	7	Punggol East SMC	33,281	202,252	North East
Potong Pasir	1	Potong Pasir SMC	17,327	17,327	Central Singapore
Sembawang-Nee Soon	10	Nee Soon GRC	148,290	290,749	North West
Sembawang-Nee Soon	10	Sembawang GRC	142,459	290,749	North West
Tampines	5	Tampines GRC	137,532	137,532	North East
Tanjong Pagar	6	Tanjong Pagar GRC	139,771	170,785	Central Singapore
Tanjong Pagar	6	Radin Mas SMC	31,014	170,785	Central Singapore
West Coast	6	West Coast GRC	121,045	146,790	South West
West Coast	6	Pioneer SMC	25,745	146,790	South West

=== 2013–2015 ===
In 2013, the number of TCs became 16. Punggol East SMC was transferred from the management of Pasir Ris–Punggol TC, run by the governing People's Action Party (PAP), to that of Aljunied–Hougang TC (renamed Aljunied–Hougang–Punggol East), after the WP gained the constituency during the 2013 by-election. The town of Sembawang–Nee Soon, comprising the two GRCs of Nee Soon and Sembawang, was divided into two towns for reasons of overpopulation, with each GRC in the former town being designated a town in its own right.

Town council	Seats	Constituencies	Electorate (2011 unless stated otherwise)		CDC
Town council	Seats	Constituencies	Constituency	Town council	CDC
Aljunied-Hougang-Punggol East	7	Aljunied GRC	143,148	198,165 (based on addition of most recent figures between 2011 and 2015)	North East
Aljunied-Hougang-Punggol East	7	Hougang SMC	23,368 (2012)	198,165 (based on addition of most recent figures between 2011 and 2015)	North East
Aljunied-Hougang-Punggol East	7	Punggol East SMC	31,649 (2013)	198,165 (based on addition of most recent figures between 2011 and 2015)	North East
Ang Mo Kio	7	Ang Mo Kio GRC	179,071	205,953	Central Singapore
Ang Mo Kio	7	Sengkang West SMC	26,882	205,953	Central Singapore
Bishan-Toa Payoh	5	Bishan-Toa Payoh GRC	122,492	122,492	Central Singapore
Chua Chu Kang	6	Chua Chu Kang GRC	158,648	214,856	South West
Chua Chu Kang	6	Hong Kah North SMC	27,701	214,856	South West
East Coast	6	East Coast GRC	120,324	142,393	South East
East Coast	6	Joo Chiat SMC	22,069	142,393	South East
Holland-Bukit Panjang	5	Holland-Bukit Timah GRC	91,607	124,660	North West
Holland-Bukit Panjang	5	Bukit Panjang SMC	33,053	124,660	North West
Jurong	6	Jurong GRC	125,276	148,475	South West
Jurong	6	Yuhua SMC	23,199	148,475	South West
Marine Parade	6	Marine Parade GRC	154,451	178,182	South East
Marine Parade	6	Mountbatten SMC	23,731	178,182	South East
Moulmein-Kallang	5	Moulmein-Kallang GRC	87,595	109,226	Central Singapore
Moulmein-Kallang	5	Whampoa SMC	21,631	109,226	Central Singapore
Nee Soon	5	Nee Soon GRC	148,290	148,290	North West
Pasir Ris–Punggol	6	Pasir Ris-Punggol GRC	168,971	168,971	North East
Potong Pasir	1	Potong Pasir SMC	17,327	17,327	Central Singapore
Sembawang	5	Sembawang GRC	142,459	142,259	North West
Tampines	5	Tampines GRC	137,532	137,532	North East
Tanjong Pagar	6	Tanjong Pagar GRC	139,771	170,785	Central Singapore
Tanjong Pagar	6	Radin Mas SMC	31,014	170,785	Central Singapore
West Coast	6	West Coast GRC	121,045	146,790	South West
West Coast	6	Pioneer SMC	25,745	146,790	South West

=== 2015–2020 ===
After the 2015 general election, the number of TCs remained at 16; all were effective from 1 December 2015. The TCs of East Coast and Jurong were respectively renamed to Aljunied-Hougang, East Coast–Fengshan and Jurong–Clementi to reflect new boundary changes, while Aljunied–Hougang–Punggol East TC reverted to Aljunied–Hougang after the PAP regained Punggol East SMC. For the first time, all town councils were overseen by GRCs, as Potong Pasir SMC, which had retained its standalone TC after the 2011 general election, fell under the purview of the revived Jalan Besar TC.

Town council	Seats	Constituencies	Electorate (2015 unless stated otherwise)		CDC
Town council	Seats	Constituencies	Constituency	Town council	CDC
Aljunied-Hougang	6	Aljunied GRC	148,142	172,239	North East
Aljunied-Hougang	6	Hougang SMC	24,097	172,239	North East
Ang Mo Kio	7	Ang Mo Kio GRC	187,771	217,890	Central Singapore
Ang Mo Kio	7	Sengkang West SMC	30,119	217,890	Central Singapore
Bishan-Toa Payoh	5	Bishan-Toa Payoh GRC	129,975	129,975	Central Singapore
Chua Chu Kang	5	Chua Chu Kang GRC	119,931	148,076	South West
Chua Chu Kang	5	Hong Kah North SMC	28,145	148,076	South West
East Coast-Fengshan	5	East Coast GRC	99,118	122,545	South East
East Coast-Fengshan	5	Fengshan SMC	23,427	122,545	South East
Holland-Bukit Panjang	5	Holland-Bukit Timah GRC	104,491	138,808	North West
Holland-Bukit Panjang	5	Bukit Panjang SMC	34,317	138,808	North West
Jalan Besar	5	Jalan Besar GRC	102,540	119,947	Central Singapore
Jalan Besar	5	Potong Pasir SMC	17,407	119,947	Central Singapore
Jurong-Clementi	7	Jurong GRC	130,498	178,842 (based on addition of most recent figures between 2015 and 2020)	South West
Jurong-Clementi	7	Bukit Batok SMC	25,727 (2016)	178,842 (based on addition of most recent figures between 2015 and 2020)	South West
Jurong-Clementi	7	Yuhua SMC	22,617	178,842 (based on addition of most recent figures between 2015 and 2020)	South West
Marine Parade	7	Marine Parade GRC	146,244	198,898	South East
Marine Parade	7	MacPherson SMC	28,511	198,898	South East
Marine Parade	7	Mountbatten SMC	24,143	198,898	South East
Marsiling-Yew Tee	4	Marsiling-Yew Tee GRC	107,599	107,599	North West
Nee Soon	5	Nee Soon GRC	132,289	132,289	North West
Pasir Ris–Punggol	7	Pasir Ris-Punggol GRC	187,396	221,862	North East
Pasir Ris–Punggol	7	Punggol East SMC	34,466	221,862	North East
Sembawang	5	Sembawang GRC	144,672	144,672	North West
Tampines	5	Tampines GRC	143,518	143,518	North East
Tanjong Pagar	6	Tanjong Pagar GRC	130,752	159,658	Central Singapore
Tanjong Pagar	6	Radin Mas SMC	28,906	159,658	Central Singapore
West Coast	5	West Coast GRC	99,300	124,758	South West
West Coast	5	Pioneer SMC	25,458	124,758	South West

=== 2020–2025 ===
Map of the town councils in Singapore in 2020.

After the 2020 general election, the number of TCs became 17; all were effective from 28 October 2020.

Town council	Seats	Constituencies	Electorate (2020)		CDC
Town council	Seats	Constituencies	Constituency	Town council	CDC
Aljunied-Hougang	6	Aljunied GRC	150,303	175,932	North East
Aljunied-Hougang	6	Hougang SMC	25,629	175,932	North East
Ang Mo Kio	7	Ang Mo Kio GRC	180,186	228,645	Central Singapore
Ang Mo Kio	7	Kebun Baru SMC	22,413	228,645	Central Singapore
Ang Mo Kio	7	Yio Chu Kang SMC	26,046	228,645	Central Singapore
Bishan-Toa Payoh	5	Bishan-Toa Payoh GRC	100,036	123,475	Central Singapore
Bishan-Toa Payoh	5	Marymount SMC	23,439	123,475	Central Singapore
Chua Chu Kang	5	Chua Chu Kang GRC	103,231	126,750	South West
Chua Chu Kang	5	Hong Kah North SMC	23,519	126,750	South West
East Coast	5	East Coast GRC	120,239	120,239	South East
Holland-Bukit Panjang	5	Holland-Bukit Timah GRC	112,999	148,257	North West
Holland-Bukit Panjang	5	Bukit Panjang SMC	35,258	148,257	North West
Jalan Besar	5	Jalan Besar GRC	106,578	125,129	Central Singapore
Jalan Besar	5	Potong Pasir SMC	18,551	125,129	Central Singapore
Jurong-Clementi	7	Jurong GRC	129,933	180,510	South West
Jurong-Clementi	7	Bukit Batok SMC	29,389	180,510	South West
Jurong-Clementi	7	Yuhua SMC	21,188	180,510	South West
Marine Parade	7	Marine Parade GRC	137,906	189,515	South East
Marine Parade	7	MacPherson SMC	27,652	189,515	South East
Marine Parade	7	Mountbatten SMC	23,957	189,515	South East
Marsiling-Yew Tee	4	Marsiling-Yew Tee GRC	114,243	114,243	North West
Nee Soon	5	Nee Soon GRC	137,906	137,906	North West
Pasir Ris–Punggol	6	Pasir Ris-Punggol GRC	161,952	187,392	North East
Pasir Ris–Punggol	6	Punggol West SMC	25,440	187,392	North East
Sembawang	5	Sembawang GRC	139,724	139,724	North West
Sengkang	4	Sengkang GRC	117,546	117,546	North East
Tampines	5	Tampines GRC	147,249	147,249	North East
Tanjong Pagar	6	Tanjong Pagar GRC	132,598	157,765	Central Singapore
Tanjong Pagar	6	Radin Mas SMC	25,167	157,765	Central Singapore
West Coast	6	West Coast GRC	144,516	169,195	South West
West Coast	6	Pioneer SMC	24,679	169,195	South West
