= Community Development Council =

Government organization in Singapore

CDC districts of Singapore as of 2020 general election

Community Development Councils (CDCs) (Note: Malay: Majlis Pembangunan Masyarakat; Chinese: 社區發展理事會; Tamil: சமூக மேம்பாட்டு மன்றம்) are a form of local councils in Singapore that serves as a bridge between the government and residents (Note: In Singapore, the term "resident" refers to both citizens and permanent residents (PRs).) living in designated districts. Each CDC functions as a platform for grassroots initiatives and community engagement, aiming to bring governance closer to the ground. The councils encourage volunteerism, promote active citizenship and strengthen social cohesion through the involvement of residents in decision-making and participation in local activities.

Established in 1997, there were originally nine CDCs but this was later consolidated into five in 2001. Each council receives government funding to administer social service schemes, welfare assistance and community development programmes for residents within its district. Council boundaries are not fixed to the regions or planning areas but are instead formed by grouping several electoral constituencies. As such, their boundaries are fluid and subject to changes that occur with every general election. CDC districts should also not be confused with town councils. Town councils operate at a more local level, are smaller in scale and more numerous. They are usually formed from stand-alone single member constituencies (SMCs) and group representation constituencies (GRCs) or a combination of both.

== History ==
CDCs were first proposed in 1996 by Prime Minister Goh Chok Tong during his National Day Rally speech. He described them as a means to foster "stronger community bonds" and "enhance social cohesion" within local communities, with the broader goal of building a "tightly-knit, compassionate and self-reliant community".

The CDCs were formally established in 1997 under the People's Association (Community Development Councils) Rules 1997, coming into effect on 29th March that year. These rules set out the functions, governance framework, organisational structure and financial provisions of the councils. They have since been amended on multiple occasions to account for adjustments to electoral boundaries as well as other administrative and procedural changes. CDCs operate under the People's Association (PA), a statutory board under the Ministry of Culture, Community and Youth (MCCY).

== Organisation ==
These are the constituencies in each of the five Community Development Council districts as of 23 May 2025:

Community Development Council	Single Member Constituencies	Group Representation Constituencies
Central Singapore	Jalan Kayu; Kebun Baru; Marymount; Potong Pasir; Radin Mas; Queenstown; Yio Chu Kang	Ang Mo Kio; Bishan–Toa Payoh; Jalan Besar; Tanjong Pagar
North East	Tampines Changkat	Pasir Ris–Changi; Punggol; Sengkang; Tampines
North West	Bukit Panjang; Sembawang West	Holland–Bukit Timah; Marsiling–Yew Tee; Nee Soon; Sembawang
South East	Hougang; Mountbatten	Aljunied; East Coast; Marine Parade–Braddell Heights
South West	Bukit Gombak; Jurong Central; Pioneer	Chua Chu Kang; Jurong East–Bukit Batok; West Coast–Jurong West

The council boundaries follow that of the existing political divisions, with each handling between four and six GRCs and SMCs and roughly dividing the country's population into equal parts. Each CDC is managed by a Council, which in turn is headed by an appointed mayor and has between 12 and 80 members. The members are appointed by the chairman or deputy chairman of the People's Association (PA).

=== Mayors ===
Community Development Council (CDC)	Current Mayor
Central Singapore	Denise Phua
North East	Baey Yam Keng
North West	Alex Yam
South East	Dinesh Vasu Dash
South West	Low Yen Ling

==== Reception ====
Singapore has a total of five mayors, each responsible for a CDC in a specific district. Mayors also serve as chairpersons of their respective CDCs. According to former politician Teo Ser Luck, who was the mayor of the North East CDC, mayors are in charge of "laying foundation for building camaraderie within communities". However, critics question the need for five mayors in a city-state such as Singapore, arguing that the roles may be redundant and an unnecessary use of public funds. In September, Prime Minister Lawrence Wong said that mayors and the CDCs they chair mobilises volunteers, addresses local needs and supports initiatives such as CDC vouchers and the Jobs Nearby scheme, the latter which helps Singaporeans find employment near their homes.

During the 2021 parliamentary debate on Budget 2021, Leader of the Opposition Pritam Singh of the Workers' Party (WP) questioned the high salaries paid to mayors (Note: Mayors receive an annual salary of S$660,000, according to a 2012 White Paper on ministerial salaries.) and whether full-time CDC mayors were necessary, or if the positions were needed at all. Central Singapore CDC's mayor, Denise Phua, responded that she is the "only full-time CDC mayor" while the others are "part-time mayors". In 2025, Phua defended the positions again following calls from the Singapore Democratic Party (SDP) to abolish them, arguing that mayors do not "take over" the work of MPs or grassroots advisors but function as a "regional role" to "aggregate resources" and "address issues" that "individual constituencies might struggle to manage".

== Funding ==
The CDCs are funded by an annual sum from the government directly proportionate to the number of residents living within their jurisdiction at a rate of S$1 per person. They are free to conduct their own fund-raising programs, which the government will match S$3 for every S$1 raised, up to a cap of S$40 million a year from 2018 financial year. Previously, the cap was S$24 million a year. The government also pays for the councils' operational costs, including that for its offices.

== See also ==
- Town Council (Singapore)
- Community Development Council Vouchers Scheme
