= 1979 Singaporean by-elections =

Singaporean by-elections in 1979

- 10 February 1979

7 seats to the Parliament of Singapore
- Registered: 80,075
- Turnout: 74,887 (93.52%) ▼1.39%
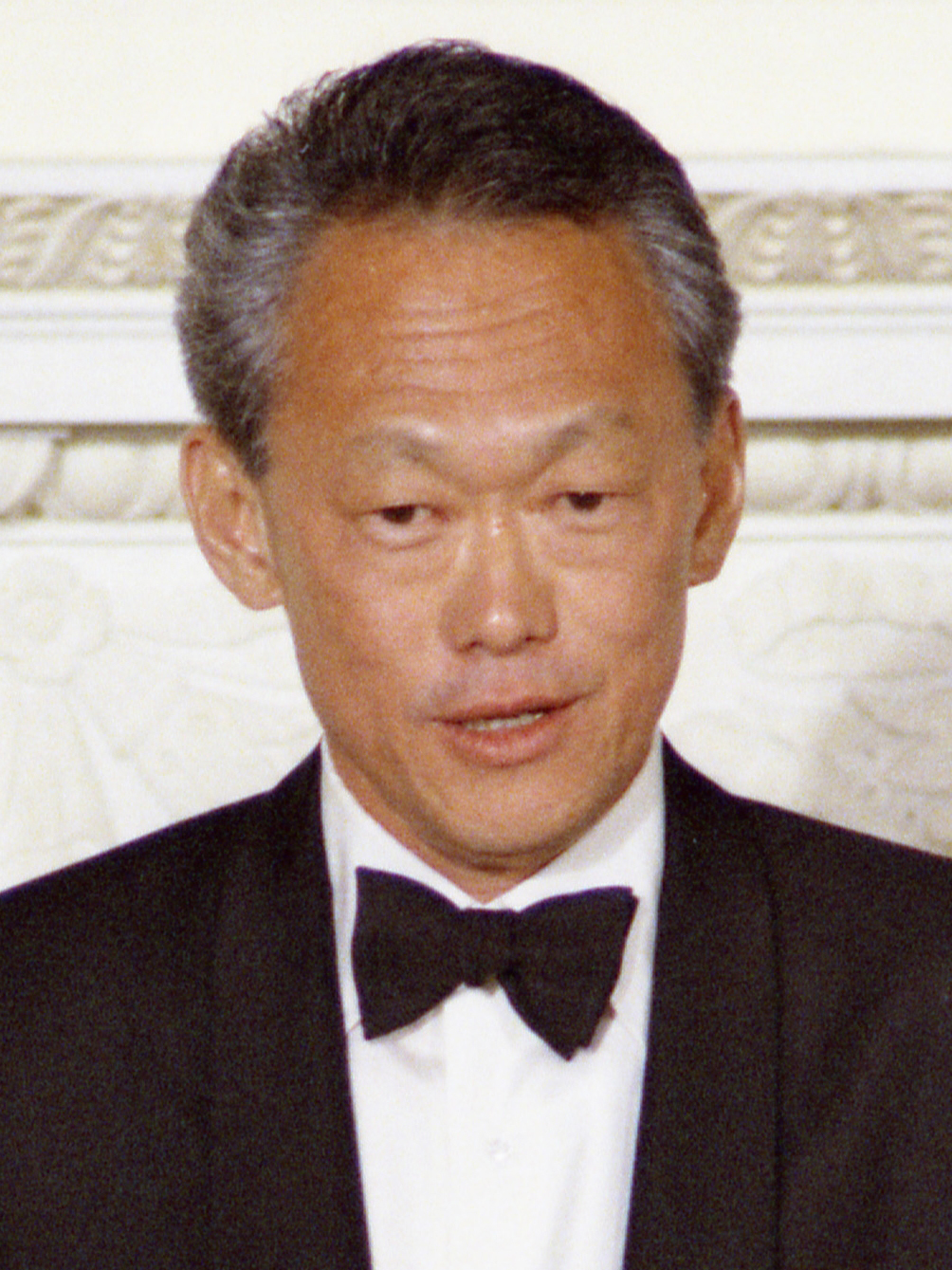

	First party	Second party
Leader	Lee Kuan Yew	J. B. Jeyaretnam
Party	PAP	WP
Seats won	7	0
Seat change	Steady	Steady
Popular vote	53,222	8,036
Percentage	72.69%	10.98%
Swing	▼1.37%	▲5.59%
MP before election
Perumal Govindaswamy
Yong Nyuk Lin
Ng Yeow Chong
Ong Soo Chuan
Ivan Baptist
Teong Eng Siong
Shaik Ahmad bin Abdul Haleem
PAP
Elected MP
Devan Nair
Teh Cheang Wan
Eugene Yap
Koh Lip Lin
Howe Yoon Chong
Tony Tan
Rohan bin Kamis
PAP

By-elections were held in Singapore on 10 February 1979 for seven constituencies, with nominations being accepted on 31 January. With 80,075 registered voters, the 1979 by-elections remain the largest by-election by combined electorate to have ever taken place in post-independence Singapore.

All candidates for the governing People's Action Party (PAP) won their respective by-elections.

== Background ==
Continuing the trend of the PAP's renewal just as they did in the 1970 by-elections, six seats, including Communications minister Yong Nyuk Lin, were vacated on 12 January to make room for six new MPs. A seventh seat in Anson was earlier vacated a year prior following the death of Perumal Govindaswamy. As such, the seven seats at stake are widely regarded as the biggest-ever by-election in Singapore's history, and it had the most seats changed since the Barisan Sosialis' mass exodus in the inaugural Parliament back in 1966.

The United People's Front criticized Barisan Sosialis for abstaining the by-elections citing an uphill contest against opposition stalwarts, notably independent Chiam See Tong, who contested in his eventual safe seat of Potong Pasir for the first time in his career (he contested Cairnhill on his debut in 1976). In the end, only Geylang West (which one United Front (now Democratic Progressive Party) candidate was later disqualified) and Nee Soon were uncontested. As of 2026, this by-election was the most recent by-election in Singapore with walkovers.

=== Candidates ===
The by-election saw the return of Devan Nair into Singapore politics since 1963; his last appearance was in 1955 where he was the only PAP candidate to be defeated in the Farrer Park Constituency, while his wife, Avadai Dhanam Lakshimi, was elected in 1963 under the Moulmein Constituency before retiring one term later in 1968. The following candidates, all from PAP, also marked their debuts:

Candidates	Background
Howe Yoon Chong	Howe, a 56-year-old senior civil servant and developer in the modern-day Singapore, was contesting in Potong Pasir; Howe had earlier planned for its debut in the 1955 election but decided not to do so due to job commitments.
Rohan bin Kamis	Rohan bin Kamis, a 30-year-old accountant and law practitioner who was contesting in Telok Blangah.
Koh Lip Lin	Koh, a 44-year-old chemist and a dean of the College of Science of Nanyang University, joined PAP a year prior to the by-election. Koh is contesting Nee Soon.
Tony Tan	Tan, a 39-year-old general manager in OCBC Bank and a former lecturer of the Department of Mathematics at NUS, marked its debut in the by-election contesting Sembawang. Tan, besides Devan Nair, would later become future presidents when Tan won the 2011 presidential election.
Teh Cheang Wan	Teh, a 51-year-old architect who is also both the chief executive officer of Housing and Development Board (HDB) and Chair of Jurong Town Corporation (JTC), made his debut contesting Geylang West. Teh resigned from both posts prior to the by-election.
Eugene Yap Giau Cheng	Yap, a 36-year-old chief chemist of Fraser and Neave, marked his electoral debut contesting in Mountbatten.

== Results ==
Anson Constituency
Party	Candidate	Votes	%	±%
PAP	Devan Nair	8,127	86.21	N/A
UF	Johnny Wee Lai Seng	1,300	13.79	N/A
Majority		6,827	72.	N/A
Total valid votes		9,427	97.25	N/A
Rejected ballots		267	2.75	N/A
Turnout		9,694	86.22	N/A
Registered electors		11,243		▼11.85
PAP hold				

By-election 1979: Geylang West
Party	Candidate	Votes	%	±%
PAP	Teh Cheang Wan	Walkover		
Majority				
Turnout		20,874		
PAP hold		Swing	N/A	

By-election 1979: Mountbatten
Party	Candidate	Votes	%	±%
PAP	Eugene Yap Giau Cheng	10,528	79.9	+14.0
UF	Seow Khee Leng	2,642	20.1	−14.0
Majority		7,886	59.8	+28
Turnout		13,536	94.9	−0.4
PAP hold		Swing	+14.0	

By-election 1979: Nee Soon
Party	Candidate	Votes	%	±%
PAP	Koh Lip Lin	Walkover		
Majority				
Turnout		15,932		
PAP hold		Swing	N/A	

By-election 1979: Potong Pasir
Party	Candidate	Votes	%	±%
PAP	Howe Yoon Chong	9,056	66.8	−8.0
Independent	Chiam See Tong	4,491	33.2	+33.2
Majority		4,565	33.6	−16
Turnout		13,854	94.2	+0.6
PAP hold		Swing	-8.0	

By-election 1979: Sembawang
Party	Candidate	Votes	%	±%
PAP	Tony Tan Keng Yam	12,824	78.4	−5.2
United People's Front	Harbans Singh	3,528	21.6	+5.2
Majority		9,296	56.8	−10.4
Turnout		16,714	94.6	−0.2
PAP hold		Swing	-5.2	

By-election 1979: Telok Blangah
Party	Candidate	Votes	%	±%
PAP	Rohan bin Kamis	12,687	61.2	N/A
WP	Joshua Benjamin Jeyaretnam	8,036	38.8	N/A
Majority		4,651	22.4	N/A
Turnout		21,089	95.0	N/A
PAP hold		Swing	N/A	
