= List of Singaporean Community Development Councils (1997–2001) =

The following is a list of Singaporean Community Development Councils from 1997 to 2001.

A total of nine Community Development Councils were set up throughout Singapore in 1997. These were reduced and simplified to five CDCs in 2001 which is under the rationalisation programme:

- Ang Mo Kio-Cheng San CDC was merged into Central Singapore CDC and North East CDC respectively.
- Bukit Timah CDC was merged into South West CDC.
- Hougang CDC was merged into North East CDC.
- Marine Parade CDC and Potong Pasir CDC were merged into South East CDC.
- Sembawang-Hong Kah CDC were split into North West CDC as well as South West CDC respectively.
- Tanjong Pagar CDC were split into Central Singapore CDC (only Tanjong Pagar GRC) and South West CDC (only West Coast GRC).

| Community Development Council | Created | Constituencies | Electorate (1997) | |
| Community Development Council | Created | Constituencies | Constituency | CDC |
|---|---|---|---|---|
| Ang Mo Kio–Cheng San | 22 November 1997 | Ang Mo Kio GRC | 125,344 | 228,667 |
| Ang Mo Kio–Cheng San | 22 November 1997 | Cheng San GRC | 103,323 | 228,667 |
| Bukit Timah | 13 December 1997 | Bukit Timah GRC | 118,248 | 164,347 |
| Bukit Timah | 13 December 1997 | Ayer Rajah SMC | 22,025 | 164,347 |
| Bukit Timah | 13 December 1997 | Chua Chu Kang SMC | 24,074 | 164,347 |
| Central Singapore | 22 November 1997 | Bishan–Toa Payoh GRC | 122,256 | 289,418 |
| Central Singapore | 22 November 1997 | Jalan Besar GRC | 71,992 | 289,418 |
| Central Singapore | 22 November 1997 | Kreta Ayer–Tanglin GRC | 75,126 | 289,418 |
| Central Singapore | 22 November 1997 | Kampong Glam SMC | 20,044 | 289,418 |
| Hougang | 13 December 1997 | Hougang SMC | 24,423 | 24,423 |
| Marine Parade | 29 March 1997 | East Coast GRC | 142,201 | 305,041 |
| Marine Parade | 29 March 1997 | Marine Parade GRC | 142,106 | 305,041 |
| Marine Parade | 29 March 1997 | MacPherson SMC | 20,734 | 305,041 |
| North East | 22 November 1997 | Aljunied GRC | 103,466 | 283,850 |
| North East | 22 November 1997 | Pasir Ris GRC | 85,908 | 283,850 |
| North East | 22 November 1997 | Tampines GRC | 94,476 | 283,850 |
| Potong Pasir | 13 December 1997 | Potong Pasir SMC | 18,759 | 18,759 |
| Sembawang–Hong Kah | 13 December 1997 | Hong Kah GRC | 125,452 | 351,034 |
| Sembawang–Hong Kah | 13 December 1997 | Sembawang GRC | 154,402 | 351,034 |
| Sembawang–Hong Kah | 13 December 1997 | Boon Lay SMC | 20,014 | 351,034 |
| Sembawang–Hong Kah | 13 December 1997 | Bukit Gombak SMC | 24,909 | 351,034 |
| Sembawang–Hong Kah | 13 December 1997 | Nee Soon Central SMC | 26,257 | 351,034 |
| Tanjong Pagar | 29 March 1997 | Tanjong Pagar GRC | 141,520 | 215,542 |
| Tanjong Pagar | 29 March 1997 | West Coast GRC | 74,022 | 215,542 |
