= Tua Jia Kar =

Replica of a well in Kovan, Singapore

- 大井脚
- The structure in 2019
- Interactive map of Tua Jia Kar
- Location: (Outside) Blk 203 Hougang Street 21
- Coordinates: 1°21′28″N 103°53′05″E

Tua Jia Kar is a replica of a well that once existed in the former Somapah Serangoon Village at Hougang, Singapore. The replica, which is also a fountain, is similarly sized to the original well and has a granite tablet that details the history of the village.

The original well was the origin of the Somapah Serangoon Village's Teochew name, Tua Jia Ka, (Note: Chinese: 大井脚; pinyin: dà jǐng jiǎo; lit. 'Foot of the big well'; Pe̍h-ūe-jī:Tuā-tséⁿ-kha; Peng'im: Dua^{7}zên^{2}ka^{1}) and was popular among the village residents as a social spot and a source of clean water; the Singaporean government demolished the village and the well in the early 1970s and replaced them with a neighbourhood centre. Tua Jia Kar was unveiled in 1998 as part of a project to redevelop the neighbourhood centre, and was added to a heritage trail of the Hougang area in 2020.

== History ==
Somapah Serangoon Village was a Teochew village in Hougang. The village's Teochew name, Tua Jia Ka, originated from a well located at the village entrance that was, according to one resident, "quite deep". The village's name translates to "Foot of the Big Well" or "big leg"; according to a 2009 article from The Straits Times, the latter possibly originates from the well "[resembling] the calves of a fat woman". The well was the village's main source of water as it consistently provided clean water, even after piped water was installed in the village. The well was also a popular social spot; street operas, street hawkers, and traditional Chinese medicine practitioners set up their businesses nearby. However, the Singaporean government demolished the village and the well in the early 1970s to build public housing projects, and the Hougang Street 21 Neighbourhood Centre stood on the site of the former village.

In 1995, The Straits Times announced that Hougang Street 21 Neighbourhood Centre would be redeveloped in the next two years to attract more shoppers. As part of this project, a well near Block 203 would be built. Ker Sin Tze, a member of parliament (MP) for the Aljunied Group Representation Constituency, suggested to Tan Kim Huat, the chairman of the Hougang South Merchants' Association, to build a landmark inspired by the area's past as part of the project. Tan, who had visited Somapah Serangoon Village and its well as a child, stated that a replica of the well "seemed to be the obvious choice" for the landmark. A year later, the Aljunied Town Council and the Hougang South Merchants' Association initiated the project. The replica was presented at a ceremony celebrating the project's completion on 4 October 1998, and the neighbourhood centre was renamed to Kovan City. (Note: ROOTS, a website founded by the National Heritage Board, and the writer Shawn Seah have stated that the replica was unveiled in 2005.) The National Heritage Board added the replica to its Hougang Heritage Trail, which was unveiled in October 2020, and titled it as Tua Jia Kar. In a review of the heritage trail, Olivia Ho of the The Straits Times stated that her visit to Tua Jia Kar was "not worth it", as it was a replica instead of the original well.

== Details ==
Tua Jia Kar is a fountain and a replica of the Somapah Serangoon Village well. The replica is located next to Block 203 at Kovan City – the former site of the Somapah Serangoon Village – near Hougang Street 21. The location of the original well, which was deemed too close to the planned Kovan MRT station, was closer to Block 205. Tua Jia Kar has a diameter of 2.5 metres (8.2 ft) and is sized similarly to the original well. A granite tablet, documenting the history of the village in English and Chinese, is placed above the well.
