= Alex Yeo =

Singaporean politician (born 1979)

The Honourable Alex Yeo
- 杨陞才

Member of the Singapore Parliament for Potong Pasir SMC
- Incumbent
- Assumed office 3 May 2025
- Preceded by: Sitoh Yih Pin
- Majority: 13,027 (46.74%)

Personal details
- Born: Alex Yeo Sheng Chye; 1979 (age 46–47) Singapore
- Party: People's Action Party
- Education: National University of Singapore; University of Sydney
- Occupation: Politician; lawyer

Alex Yeo Sheng Chye (Note: Chinese: 杨陞才; pinyin: Yáng Shēngcái) (born 1979) is a Singaporean politician and lawyer. A member of the governing People's Action Party (PAP), he has been the Member of Parliament (MP) for Potong Pasir Single Member Constituency (SMC) since 2025.

== Education ==
Yeo was part of the debating team in Victoria School and Tampines Junior College. He studied economics and political science at the National University of Singapore and later graduated from the University of Sydney with a degree in law.

== Career ==
Yeo is a lawyer. (Note: List of sources:) He is qualified in both Singapore and Australia and is the director of Niru & Co LLC.

=== Political career ===
Yeo began volunteering for the PAP in Potong Pasir SMC in 2013 or 2014. (Note: One source claims that he began in 2013, while another claims that he began in 2014.) He became the party's branch secretary for the constituency in 2015. In 2017, he became the branch chairperson (Note: Another name for a "grassroots advisor", an individual appointed for "grassroots engagement and outreach" in a GRC division or SMC who, according to the People's Association (PA), has to be aligned with the "Government of the day". They do not need to be the elected MP for the area.) for the Paya Lebar division of Aljunied Group Representation Constituency (GRC), held by the Workers' Party (WP), after Murali Pillai, the previous chairperson, was appointed to the same role in Bukit Batok SMC, being the PAP candidate for its 2016 by-election.

In the 2020 general election, Yeo was fielded in Aljunied GRC; the five-member PAP team lost to the WP team, led by party leader Pritam Singh, with 40.05% of the vote.

In 2024, Yeo was replaced as branch chairperson for Paya Lebar by Kenny Sim.

In the 2025 general election, Yeo was fielded in Potong Pasir SMC, replacing incumbent Sitoh Yih Pin, who had retired from electoral politics. He defeated Williamson Lee, treasurer of the Singapore People's Party (SPP), and Lim Tean, secretary-general of the People's Alliance for Reform (PAR), with 69.2% of the vote in a three-way contest.

=== Personal life ===
Married to Priya Pillay with 2 children.

== Notes ==
Parliament of Singapore
Preceded by Sitoh Yih Pin	Member of Parliament for Potong Pasir SMC; 2025–present	Incumbent
