= Ho Peng Kee =

Singaporean legal academic and politician (born 1954)

- 何炳基
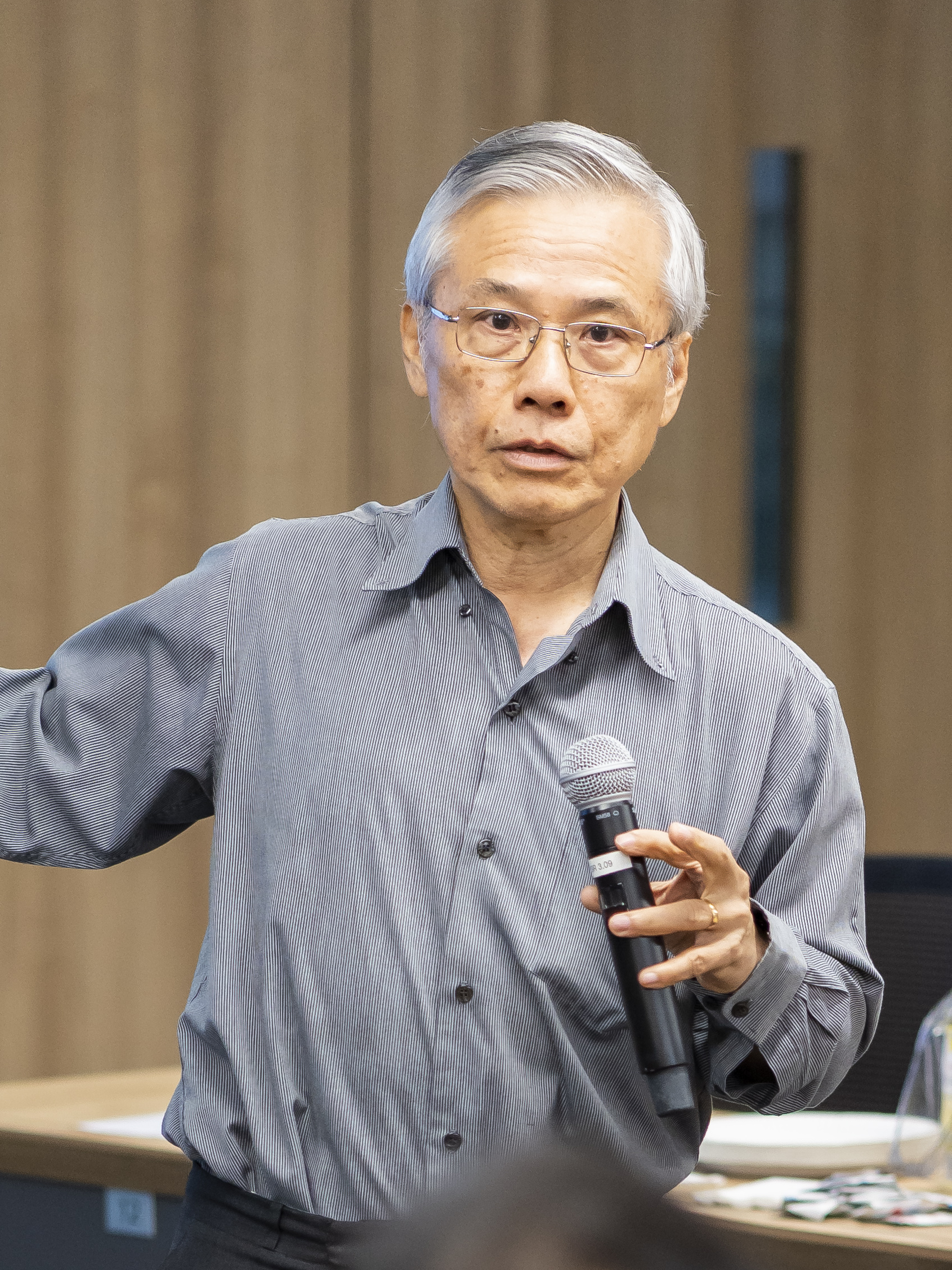
- Ho speaking to students at the SMU School of Law in 2019

Member of the Singapore Parliament for Nee Soon East SMC
- In office 3 November 2001 – 19 April 2011
- Preceded by: Himself (Sembawang GRC – Nee Soon East)
- Succeeded by: Patrick Tay (Nee Soon GRC – Nee Soon East)
- Majority: 11,414 (37.2%)

Member of the Singapore Parliament for Sembawang GRC (Nee Soon East)
- In office 21 August 1991 – 3 November 2001
- Preceded by: Charles Chong
- Succeeded by: Himself (Nee Soon East SMC)
- Majority: Walkover

Personal details
- Born: Ho Peng Kee; 9 May 1954 (age 72) Colony of Singapore
- Party: People's Action Party
- Education: Anglo-Chinese School (Independent), National Junior College, National University of Singapore, Harvard Law School

Ho Peng Kee (Note: Chinese: 何炳基; Pe̍h-ōe-jī: Hô Péng-ki; pinyin: Hé Bǐngjī) (born 9 May 1954) is a Singaporean legal academic and former politician. A member of the governing People's Action Party (PAP), he was the Senior Minister of State in the Ministry of Law and the Ministry of Home Affairs, and a Member of Parliament representing the Nee Soon East Single Member Constituency. Ho retired from politics on 31 March 2011 before the 2011 Singaporean general election.

== Education ==
Ho had his early education at Anglo-Chinese School and National Junior College, before going on to earn a Bachelor of Laws (LLB) from the National University of Singapore, and a Master of Laws (LLM) from Harvard Law School.

He is called to the Bar as an advocate and solicitor of the Supreme Court of Singapore.

== Career ==
=== Academic career ===
Ho was formerly an academic, and at one time the Vice-Dean of the Faculty of Law at the National University of Singapore (NUS). His academic research interests have included alternative methods of dispute settlement, consumer law and protection, the law of contract, and law and society. He retains the title of associate professor as he is on long-term secondment from NUS.

=== Political career ===
Ho was the Member of Parliament for the Sembawang Group Representation Constituency from 1991 to 2001. When Sembawang GRC was split up in 2001, Ho contested Nee Soon East Single Member Constituency and won the election. He then contested the 2006 elections as the incumbent MP and won a second term.

Ho announced his retirement from politics on 31 March 2011, prior to the 2011 Singapore general election.

== Personal life ==
Ho is an elder at Mount Carmel Bible-Presbyterian Church.

== Notes ==
Parliament of Singapore
Preceded by Charles Chong	Member of Parliament for Sembawang GRC (Nee Soon East); 1991–2001	Succeeded by Himself as MP for Nee Soon East SMC
Preceded by Himself as MP for Sembawang GRC (Nee Soon East)	Member of Parliament for Nee Soon East SMC; 2001–2011	Succeeded by Patrick Tay as MP for Nee Soon GRC (Nee Soon East)
