= Community Development Council Vouchers Scheme =

Singaporean state-issued vouchers

The Community Development Council Vouchers Scheme (Chinese: 社区发展理事会邻里购物券; Malay: Baucar CDC; Tamil: CDC பற்றுச்சீட்டு), known colloquially as CDC Vouchers, is a social transfer and economic stimulus program in Singapore, administered by the five Community Development Councils (CDCs) under the purview of the People's Association (PA) and the Ministry of Culture, Community and Youth (MCCY). First introduced in 2020 as a targeted relief measure for lower-income households during the COVID-19 pandemic, the scheme has since evolved into a universal, digitalised fiscal transfer program. It is now distributed on a recurring basis to all Singaporean households, regardless of income level or housing type.

== Purpose ==
The scheme serves two primary policy objectives: to provide direct financial assistance to Singaporean households coping with the rising cost of living and inflationary pressures, and to stimulate the local economy by channeling consumption toward participating hawkers, heartland merchants, and, in later tranches, supermarket chains. The initiative is a key component of the Singapore government's broader social support framework, often integrated with major fiscal packages such as the Assurance Package (AP), the Household Support Package, and the Cost-of-Living (COL) Support Package.

== Denominations ==
Unless otherwise stated, each household or citizen is issued vouchers in the following denominations. These vouchers carry a direct value in Singapore dollars (S$); however, they are not interchangeable when making purchases, and exact change is not provided for transactions of a lower value. Supermarket vouchers, as the name suggests, are only valid at supermarkets such as Sheng Siong, NTUC FairPrice, and Cold Storage.

Denominations
Vouchers			Denominations					
Name	Usage	Type	$2	$5	$10	$20	$50	Total
CDC vouchers (non-May)	Regular	Household	15	12	6			$150
CDC vouchers (non-May)	Supermarket	Household			15			$150
CDC vouchers (May)	Regular	Household	25	20	10			$250
CDC vouchers (May)	Supermarket	Household			15	5		$250
Climate vouchers		Household	5	4	12		3	$300
SG60 vouchers	Regular	Adults (age 21 to 59)	15	20	17			$300
SG60 vouchers	Regular	Seniors (age 60 or above)	30	14	27			$400
SG60 vouchers	Supermarket	Adults (age 21 to 59)			14	8		$300
SG60 vouchers	Supermarket	Seniors (age 60 or above)			20	10		$400

== Operation ==
Operationally, the CDC Vouchers Scheme utilizes the RedeemSG platform, a government-built digital voucher infrastructure that allows residents to claim and spend vouchers using their Singpass accounts and mobile devices, thereby eliminating the logistical friction associated with physical paper vouchers. As of 2026, the scheme has disbursed billions of dollars in vouchers, with high utilization rates exceeding 97% across multiple tranches, reflecting its widespread acceptance and integration into the daily consumption habits of the population.

== History ==
In early 2020, Singapore implemented its "circuit breaker" measures, a stringent lockdown measure in response to the COVID-19 pandemic that halted most non-essential economic activities. While necessary for public health, these measures severely impacted the livelihoods of daily-rated workers and small business owners, particularly those in the residential public housing estates where the majority of Singaporeans live. Hawkers and small merchants saw footfall evaporate, threatening their survival. Simultaneously, lower-income households faced immediate liquidity crunches due to wage cuts and job losses.

=== Pilot tranches ===
Recognising the dual crisis affecting both consumers and small businesses, the five District Mayors, led by the Mayors' Committee, conceptualised the CDC Vouchers Scheme as a "community initiative". On 12 June 2020, then-Deputy Prime Minister and Finance Minister Heng Swee Keat launched the inaugural scheme at a virtual event. This pilot was funded by a S$20 million grant allocated from the Unity and Resilience Budgets of 2020.

Unlike later nationwide iterations, this first tranche was strictly means-tested. It targeted "identified lower-income households" who were most vulnerable to the economic shock. Approximately 400,000 households were identified as eligible beneficiaries. Each eligible household received S$50 in physical paper vouchers. The vouchers were printed in small denominations of S$2 to facilitate micro-transactions at hawker stalls and small shops, ensuring that the entire value could be easily spent on low-cost meals or essential items without requiring cash change. Eligible households received notification letters via mail. To collect the vouchers, residents had to physically visit their designated Community Centres (CCs) or Residents' Committees (RCs) and present their National Registration Identity Card (NRIC) for verification.

Following the successful uptake of the first tranche, a second tranche was launched in January 2021. This tranche continued the focus on lower-income households, providing further relief as the economy began a slow recovery. The objective remained consistent: defraying the cost of living for the vulnerable while driving revenue to heartland businesses.

=== Nationwide expansion ===
In Budget 2021, the government announced that the CDC Vouchers Scheme would be expanded from a niche welfare program into a nationwide fiscal transfer applicable to all Singaporean households. This shift acknowledged that the economic impact of the pandemic and rising global inflation were affecting the middle class as well as the poor.

To scale the scheme from 400,000 households to over 1.3 million, the reliance on physical paper vouchers became untenable. The solution was RedeemSG, a digital voucher system developed by Open Government Products (OGP), a division of GovTech (Government Technology Agency). RedeemSG utilizes a web-based interface where a unique voucher link is sent via SMS. A designated household member logs in to the claim portal using Singpass.

=== Institutionalisation ===
By 2023, the CDC Vouchers Scheme had transitioned from an ad hoc pandemic measure to a structured component of Singapore's social safety net, specifically within the Assurance Package (AP) designed to cushion the impact of the Goods and Services Tax (GST) rate increase from 7% to 9% from 2023 to 2024. A major structural change was introduced in the 2023 tranche. Feedback from the public indicated a desire for greater flexibility, as many households purchased daily necessities from supermarkets rather than wet markets. The voucher value was split into two distinct, non-transferable categories: S$150 for heartland merchants and hawkers, S$150 for participating supermarkets.

In response to persistent cost-of-living concerns, the government increased both the frequency and value of the vouchers in 2024. The scheme continues to be a central pillar of the Assurance Package and Cost-of-Living Support Package announced in Budget 2025 by Prime Minister and Minister for Finance Lawrence Wong.

== Challenges ==
=== Phishing and scams ===
Scammers have targeted the scheme's reliance on SMS links. Victims receive SMS messages that appear to be from the government, asking them to click a link to "claim" their vouchers. These links lead to phishing sites designed to steal Singpass credentials or banking details. The Police and MCCY have issued repeated advisories stating that official SMSes will never ask for banking details and will only come from the sender ID "gov.sg" or "RedeemSG".

=== Illicit resales ===
The scheme's terms and conditions explicitly prohibit the resale of vouchers or their exchange for cash. Listings occasionally appear on platforms like Carousell and Facebook Marketplace offering to sell vouchers for cash at a discounted rate. The CDCs monitor these platforms and work with administrators to take down such listings. Sellers face potential investigation for fraud or criminal breach of trust.
