= Sitoh Yih Pin =

Singaporean politician (born 1963)

Sitoh Yih Pin CBE
- 司徒宇斌
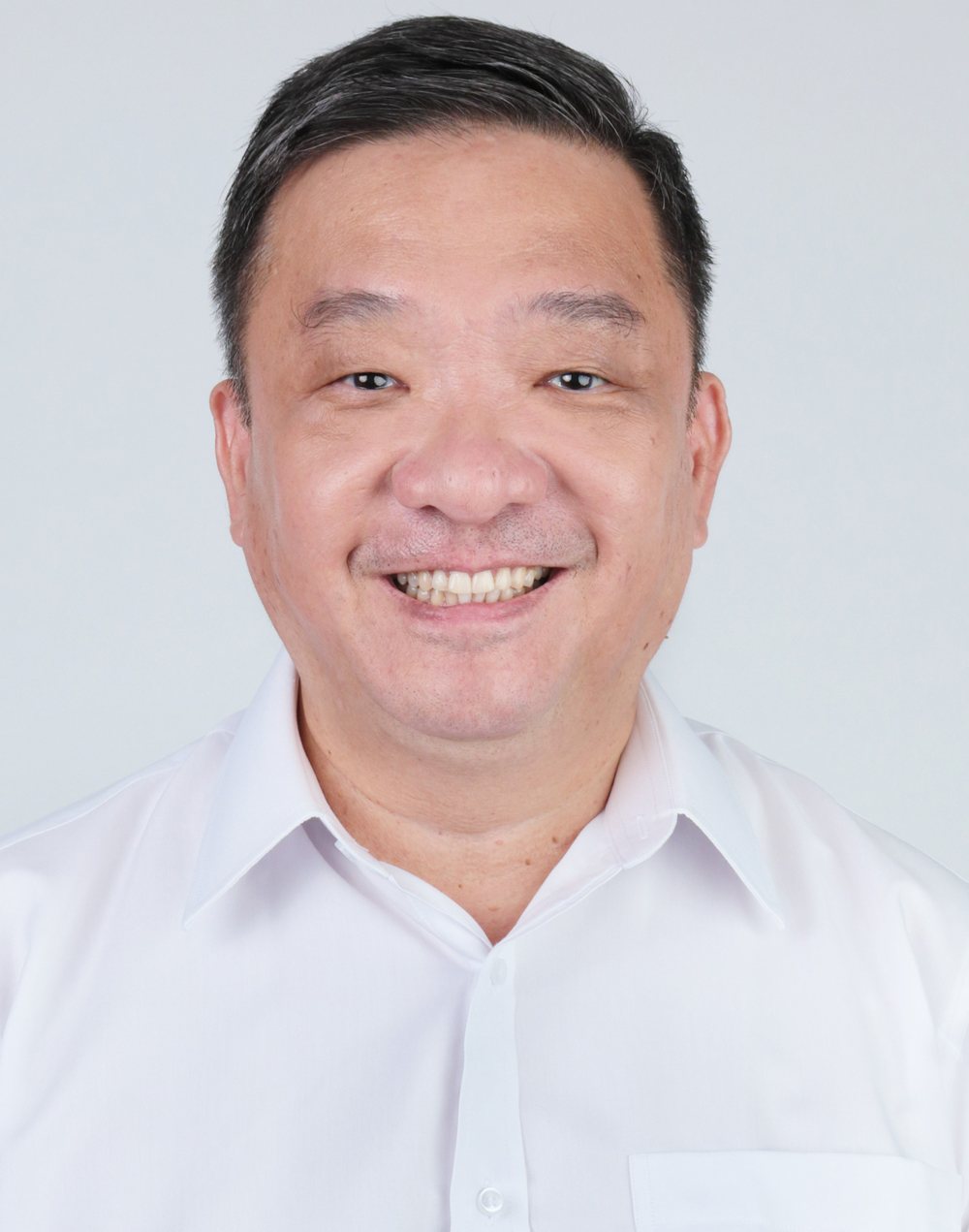
- Official portrait, 2021

Non-Resident Ambassador of Singapore to the Maldives
- Incumbent
- Assumed office 21 July 2026
- Minister: Vivian Balakrishnan
- Preceded by: Soo Kok Leng

Member of the Singapore Parliament for Potong Pasir SMC
- In office 7 May 2011 – 15 April 2025
- Preceded by: Chiam See Tong
- Succeeded by: Alex Yeo
- Majority: 2011: 114 (0.72%); 2015: 5,234 (32.78%); 2020: 3,962 (21.34%)

Personal details
- Born: 2 December 1963 (age 62) State of Singapore, Malaysia
- Party: People's Action Party
- Education: National University of Singapore

Sitoh Yih Pin CBE (Chinese: 司徒宇斌; pinyin: Sītú Yǔbīn; born 2 December 1963) is a Singaporean diplomat and retired politician who currently serves as Singapore's Non-Resident High Commissioner to the Maldives. A member of the governing People's Action Party (PAP), he was the Member of Parliament (MP) for Potong Pasir Single Member Constituency (SMC) between 2011 and 2025.

An accountant by profession, Sitoh first entered electoral politics in the 2001 general election as the PAP candidate for Potong Pasir SMC; he lost to incumbent Chiam See Tong.

Despite losing to Chiam again in the 2006 general election, Sitoh defeated Lina Loh, (Note: Also known as Lina Chiam.) Chiam's wife, in the 2011 general election, after her husband left to contest Bishan–Toa Payoh Group Representation Constituency (GRC).

He retired from electoral politics at the 2025 general election.

== Career ==
=== Accounting career ===
Sitoh graduated from the National University of Singapore with a Bachelor of Accountancy in 1987. He is a registered chartered accountant in Singapore and Australia. Sitoh worked as an audit manager at KPMG before starting his own accounting firm, Nexia TS Public Accounting, in 1993.

=== Political career ===
Sitoh made his political debut during the 2001 general election as the PAP candidate for Potong Pasir SMC; he won 47.57% of the vote, being defeated by Chiam, who was standing under the banner of the newly created Singapore Democratic Alliance (SDA), comprising his Singapore People's Party (SPP) and three other parties.

Sitoh challenged Chiam again in Potong Pasir SMC during the 2006 general election, losing for the second time in a row with a decreased 44.18% of the vote. At that election, in a PAP strategy to reclaim the two opposition constituencies of Potong Pasir and Hougang (both SMCs), Senior Minister Goh Chok Tong had promised to help a victorious Sitoh gain a post in the new Cabinet, on top of extra latitude when speaking and voting in Parliament and not being subjected to the PAP whip.

On 28 February 2011, prior to the general election in the same year, the SDA removed Chiam from his position as chairperson of the coalition. Subsequently, on 2 March, Chiam announced that he would withdraw the SPP from the SDA.

During the 2011 general election, Chiam left Potong Pasir SMC to contest in Bishan–Toa Payoh GRC. Loh, his wife, replaced him as the SPP candidate for the SMC; a recount confirmed that Sitoh defeated her by 0.72% of the vote, or 114 votes. He subsequently became a member of the Public Petitions Committee in the 12th Parliament.

In the 2015 general election, Sitoh won 66.39% of the vote in a rematch against Loh. In January 2017, he was co-opted into the PAP's Central Executive Committee (CEC).

In the 2020 general election, Sitoh won reelection with 60.67% of the vote against newcomer Jose Raymond from the SPP.

On 16 April 2025, prior to the general election in the same year, Sitoh announced his retirement from electoral politics; he was replaced by Alex Yeo, former PAP candidate for Aljunied GRC, held by the Workers' Party (WP), and unelected branch chairperson for its Paya Lebar division.

Following his retirement from politics, Sitoh was appointed Non-Resident High Commissioner to the Maldives on 21 July 2026.

== Other appointments ==
Sitoh held executive and non-executive directorships on the boards of several companies, including Lian Beng Group, United Food Holdings, TalkMed Group and ISEC Healthcare.

== Notes ==
Parliament of Singapore
Preceded by Chiam See Tong	Member of Parliament for Potong Pasir SMC; 2011–2025	Succeeded by Alex Yeo
