= Koh Lip Lin =

Singaporean former politician and chemist (1935–2015)

- 高立人

Member of Parliament for Nee Soon South SMC
- In office 3 September 1988 – 16 December 1996
- Preceded by: Constituency established
- Succeeded by: Constituency abolished

Member of Parliament for Nee Soon Constituency
- In office 23 December 1980 – 3 September 1988
- Preceded by: Ong Soon Chuan
- Succeeded by: Constituency abolished

Personal details
- Born: 1935 Straits Settlements
- Died: 12 February 2015 (aged 79) Singapore
- Children: 2
- Education: Boston University

Koh Lip Lin (Note: Chinese: 高立人; Pe̍h-ōe-jī: Ko Li̍p-lîn; pinyin: Gāo Lìrén) (1935 – 12 February 2015) was a Singaporean chemist and former politician. A former member of the People's Action Party (PAP), he served as the Member of Parliament (MP) for Nee Soon Constituency from 1980 to 1988 and the MP for Nee Soon South Single Member Constituency from 1988 to 1996, both of which he served two terms, until they were absorbed by Ang Mo Kio Group Representation Constituency. He also served as the first dean of the Science Faculty for the National University of Singapore (NUS) from 1980 to 1996.

== Early life ==
Koh was born in 1935. He attended Chung Cheng High School in 1954. In 1960, Koh received a Bachelor of Science from Nanyang University and a PhD in Science from the University of Boston.

== Career ==
Koh was director of Heeton Holdings until 2012 when he retired.

=== Academic career ===
In 1972, Koh was appointed the dean of the College of Science of Nanyang University. In 1978, Koh joined the People's Action Party (PAP) and was a member of the Estimates Committee of Parliament (from 1979 to 1990) and the Urban and Rural Service Committee (from 1979 to 1988). He stated that before joining, he had previously been asked by the PAP to join in "1970 or 1972".

In the late 1970s to 80s, Koh, along with several others, supported the merging of Nanyang University and the University of Singapore to form the National University of Singapore (NUS).

=== Political career ===
Koh became the Member of Parliament (MP) representing Nee Soon Constituency after the 1980 Singaporean general election where he was elected unopposed. In 1987, Koh opened the S$5 million Jiemin Primary School. In the 1984 Singaporean general election, Koh remained as the MP representing Nee Soon Constituency after winning 74.24% of the vote against Singapore United Front's (SUF) Quek Teow Chuan's 25.76% of the vote.

During the 1988 Singaporean general election, Koh became the MP representing Nee Soon South Single Member Constituency after winning 64.9% of the votes against Singapore Democratic Party's (SDP) Yong Chu Leong with 30.7% and United People's Front's (UPF) Munjeet Singh with 4.39%.

In the 1991 Singaporean general election, Koh secured a second term as the MP representing the Nee Soon South Single Member Constituency by winning 52.9% of the vote against SDP's Low Yong Nguan. In 1996, Koh complained that his branch's library had not been made since it was materialized 10 years ago, asking for a progress report on the Library 2000 project.

He retired from politics in 1996 after being an MP since 1979.

== Death ==
Koh died on 12 February 2015 at 79.
