= Nee Soon South Single Member Constituency =

Historical constituency in Singapore

Coordinates: 1.4161094°N 103.8347436°E

Nee Soon South Single Member Constituency was a single member constituency (SMC) consisting of Yishun's Neighbourhood 8 (Khatib), part of Neighbourhood 7, near Springleaf MRT station, houses and condominiums along Kebun Baru and private residential areas along Sembawang Road (near Sembawang Army Camp). It was formed in 1988 after Nee Soon Constituency was split up into several SMCs. It was merged into Ang Mo Kio Group Representation Constituency (GRC) in 1997.

== Member of Parliament ==
Year	Member of Parliament	Party
1988	Koh Lip Lin	PAP
1991	Koh Lip Lin	PAP

== Electoral results ==
Note: The Elections Department does not include rejected votes when calculating the vote shares of candidates. Hence, all candidates' vote shares will total to 100% at any given election (may not appear so in multi-way contests due to rounding).

=== Elections in 1980s ===
General Election 1988: Nee Soon South
Party	Candidate	Votes	%	±%
PAP	Koh Lip Lin	13,793	64.88	
SDP	Yong Chu Leong	6,533	30.73	
United People's Front	Munjeet Singh	932	4.39	
Turnout		21,710	96.3	
PAP win (new seat)				

=== Elections in 1990s ===
General Election 1991: Nee Soon South
Party	Candidate	Votes	%	±%
PAP	Koh Lip Lin	13,719	52.76	−12.12
SDP	Low Yong Nguan	12,284	47.24	+12.12
Turnout		26,576	95.9	−0.4
PAP hold		Swing	-12.12	

== See also ==
- Nee Soon SMC
- Nee Soon Central SMC
- Nee Soon East SMC
- Nee Soon GRC
