= Nee Soon East Single Member Constituency =

Historic constituency in Singapore

Coordinates: 1.433°N 103.84°E

Nee Soon East
- Former single member constituency
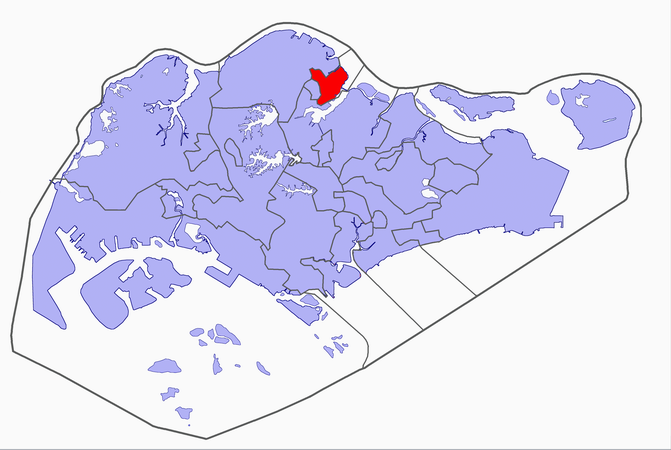
- Nee Soon East Single Member Constituency.
- Region: North Region, Singapore
- Electorate: 32,569

Former constituency
- Created: 2001
- Abolished: 2011
- Seats: 1
- Party: People's Action Party
- Member: 1
- Created from: Sembawang Group Representation Constituency
- Replaced by: Nee Soon Group Representation Constituency

Nee Soon East Single Member Constituency (SMC) was a single member constituency in the northern area of Singapore. The ward consists of Yishun's Neighbourhoods 2, 3 and 4.

== History ==
In 2001, the Nee Soon East SMC was formed by carving out part of Sembawang Group Representation Constituency (GRC). It was contested by Ho Peng Kee of the People's Action Party (PAP) and Poh Lee Guan of the Workers' Party (WP). Ho won the election with 19,566 votes (76.68%) and was elected the Member of Parliament for the constituency.

In 2006, Poh contested the constituency against incumbent Ho. Ho won the election again with 20,949 votes (68.72%) and retained his seat.

In 2011, the Nee Soon GRC was created for the 2011 general election. Nee Soon East and Nee Soon Central SMCs were absorbed into the GRC alongside with parts of Ang Mo Kio and Sembawang GRCs.

== Member of Parliament ==
Year	Member	Party
Formation
2001	Ho Peng Kee	PAP
2006	Ho Peng Kee	PAP
Constituency abolished (2011)

== Electoral results ==
Note: The Elections Department does not include rejected votes when calculating the vote shares of candidates. Hence, all candidates' vote shares will total to 100% at any given election (may not appear so in multi-way contests due to rounding).

=== Elections in 2000s ===
General Election 2001
Party	Candidate	Votes	%
PAP	Ho Peng Kee	19,566	73.68
WP	Poh Lee Guan	6,990	26.32
Majority		12,576	47.36
Total valid votes		26,556	98.47
Rejected ballots		413	1.53
Turnout		26,969	94.74
Registered electors		28,465	
PAP win (new seat)			

General Election 2006
Party	Candidate	Votes	%	±%
PAP	Ho Peng Kee	20,949	68.72	▼4.96
WP	Poh Lee Guan	9,535	31.28	▲4.96
Majority		11,414	37.44	▼9.92
Total valid votes		30,484	98.25	▼0.22
Rejected ballots		544	1.75	▲0.22
Turnout		31,028	95.27	▲0.53
Registered electors		32,569		▲15.22
PAP hold		Swing	▼4.96	

== See also ==
- Nee Soon Central SMC
- Nee Soon South SMC
- Nee Soon SMC
- Nee Soon GRC
