= Nee Soon Constituency =

Parliamentary constituency in Singapore

Nee Soon
- Single Member constituency for the Parliament of Singapore
- Region: Singapore

Current constituency
- Created: 1959
- Seats: 1
- Member: Constituency Abolished
- Town Council: Nee Soon
- Replaced by: Nee Soon GRC

Nee Soon Constituency was a single member constituency in the northern area in Singapore that was created in 1959 general elections and ceased to exist prior to 1988 general elections.

== History ==
Nee Soon was one of the rural areas in the north of Singapore. At its inception in 1959, there were only 8,694 voters even including present-day Ang Mo Kio town, whereas wards nearer to the city centre such as Kreta Ayer had 14,173 voters in a much smaller area.

This ward was finally dissolved prior to the 1988 general elections, with most of the ward forming Nee Soon South SMC consisting of Khatib and Yio Chu Kang (near Yio Chu Kang MRT station), and the portion in Yishun Central being renamed Nee Soon Central SMC where former opposition MP Cheo Chai Chen made his debut there. The remainder of this constituency was carved into 2 sub-divisions of Chong Pang and Nee Soon East. The latter ward was a part of Sembawang GRC until the 2001 general elections which saw the Workers' Party contest there.

== Member of Parliament ==
Year	Member of Parliament	Party
Legislative Assembly of Singapore
1959	Sheng Nam Chin	PAP
1963	Chan Sun Wing	BS
Parliament of Singapore
1968	Ong Soo Chuan	PAP
1972	Ong Soo Chuan	PAP
1976	Ong Soo Chuan	PAP
1979	Koh Lip Lin	PAP
1980	Koh Lip Lin	PAP
1984	Koh Lip Lin	PAP

== Electoral results ==
Note: The Elections Department does not include rejected votes when calculating the vote shares of candidates. Hence, all candidates' vote shares will total to 100% at any given election (may not appear so in multi-way contests due to rounding).

=== Elections in 1950s ===
General Election 1959: Nee Soon
Party	Candidate	Votes	%	±%
PAP	Sheng Nam Chin	5,622	73.30	N/A
SPA	Yap Chin Poh	1,476	19.24	N/A
LSP	Yong Nyuk Khoon	572	7.46	N/A
Majority		4,146	54.06	
Turnout		7,764	89.3	
PAP win (new seat)				

=== Elections in 1960s ===
General Election 1963: Nee Soon
Party	Candidate	Votes	%	±%
BS	Chan Sun Wing	4,914	51.33	+51.33
PAP	How Kang Yong	3,329	34.77	−38.53
UPP	Goh Soo Ming	864	9.02	+9.02
SA	Yeo Teo Bok	364	3.80	+3.80
Independent	Lim Siak Guan	103	1.08	+1.08
Majority		1,585	16.56	+16.56
Turnout		25,789	96.1	+0.2
BS gain from PAP		Swing	-38.53	

General Election 1968: Nee Soon
Party	Candidate	Votes	%	±%
PAP	Ong Soo Chuan	10,442	91.35	+56.58
WP	Wong Hong Toy	989	8.65	+8.65
Majority		9,453	82.7	+82.7
Turnout		11,841	92.2	−3.9
PAP gain from BS		Swing	+56.58	

=== Elections in 1970s ===
General Election 1972: Nee Soon
Party	Candidate	Votes	%	±%
PAP	Ong Soo Chuan	11,636	73.29	−18.06
United National Front	Yap Fatt Shing	4,240	26.71	+26.71
Majority		7,396	46.58	−36.12
Turnout		16,279	95.4	+3.2
PAP hold		Swing	-18.06	

General Election 1976: Nee Soon
Party	Candidate	Votes	%	±%
PAP	Ong Soo Chuan	Walkover		
Majority				
Turnout		16,143		
PAP hold		Swing		

=== Elections in 1980s ===
General Election 1980: Nee Soon
Party	Candidate	Votes	%	±%
PAP	Koh Lip Lin	Walkover		
Majority				
Turnout		16,817		
PAP hold		Swing		

General Election 1984: Nee Soon
Party	Candidate	Votes	%	±%
PAP	Koh Lip Lin	18,444	74.24	N/A
SUF	Quek Teow Chuan	6,401	25.76	N/A
Majority		12,043	48.48	
Turnout		25,789	95.9	
PAP hold		Swing		

== See also ==
- Nee Soon Central SMC
- Nee Soon East SMC
- Nee Soon South SMC
- Nee Soon GRC
