= Bukit Gombak Single Member Constituency =

Electoral division in Singapore

Coordinates: 1.360°N 103.760°E

Bukit Gombak
- Single-member constituency for the Parliament of Singapore
- Region: West Region, Singapore
- Electorate: 26,427

Current constituency
- Created: 1988; 38 years ago
- Seats: 1
- Party: People's Action Party
- Member: Low Yen Ling
- Town Council: Chua Chu Kang
- Merged: 2001
- Merged into: Hong Kah GRC
- Reformed: 2025
- Reformed from: Chua Chu Kang GRC

The Bukit Gombak Single Member Constituency (Note: Malay: Kawasan Undi Perseorangan Bukit Gombak; Chinese: 武吉甘柏单选区; Tamil: புக்கிட் கோம்பாக் தனித்தொகுதி) is a single-member constituency (SMC) situated in western Singapore. Established in 2025, it is managed by Chua Chu Kang Town Council (CCKTC). The current Member of Parliament (MP) for the constituency is Low Yen Ling from the People's Action Party (PAP).

== Electoral history ==
Interactive map of Bukit Gombak SMC as of the 2025 general election

In the leadup to the 2025 general election, Bukit Gombak SMC was recreated from Chua Chu Kang GRC, comprising estates in Bukit Gombak and Hillview. The recreation was officially attributed to population growth in Tengah, which had been absorbed by the same GRC, and a goal of retaining the same seat count in GRCs.

The PAP fielded Low Yen Ling, the former MP for the Bukit Gombak division of Chua Chu Kang GRC, to stand for reelection in the SMC. She defeated Harish Pillay from the Progress Singapore Party (PSP) with 75.81% of the vote.

== Member of Parliament ==
Year	Member	Party
Formation
2025	Low Yen Ling	PAP

== Electoral results ==
Note: The Elections Department does not include rejected votes when calculating the vote shares of candidates. Hence, all candidates' vote shares will total to 100% at any given election (may not appear so in multi-way contests due to rounding).

=== Elections in 2020s ===
General Election 2025
Party	Candidate	Votes	%
PAP	Low Yen Ling	17,946	75.81
PSP	Harish Pillay	5,726	24.19
Majority		12,220	51.62
Total valid votes		23,672	98.76
Rejected ballots		298	1.24
Turnout		23,970	90.70
Registered electors		26,427	
PAP win (new seat)			
