= Nee Soon Central Single Member Constituency =

Historical constituency of Singapore

Coordinates: 1.423°N 103.836°E

Nee Soon Central
- Former Single Member constituency for the Parliament of Singapore
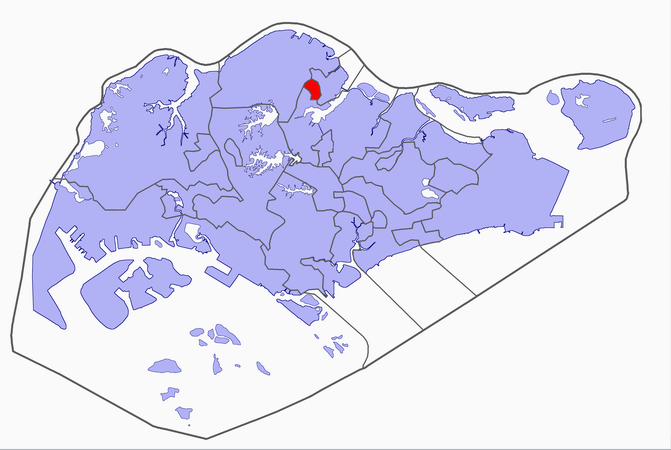
- Region: North Region, Singapore

Former constituency
- Created: 1988
- Abolished: 2011
- Seats: 1
- Member: Constituency abolished
- Town Council: Sembawang
- Created from: Nee Soon Constituency
- Replaced by: Nee Soon GRC

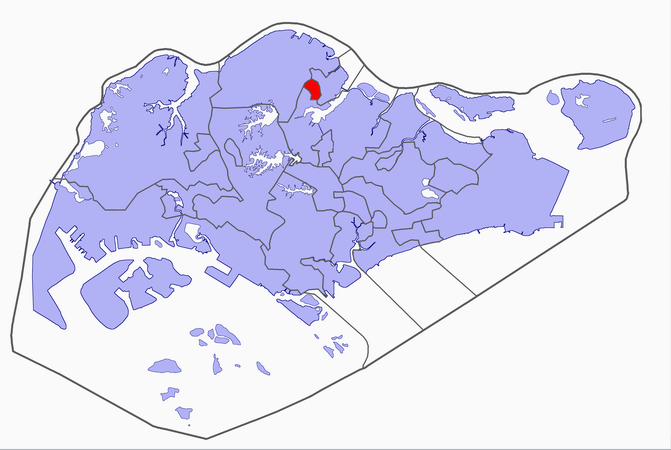
Nee Soon Central Single Member Constituency.

Nee Soon Central Single Member Constituency was a single member constituency (SMC) in the northern area of Singapore. The seat consists of Yishun Town Centre (Neighbourhood 9), Neighbourhood 6 and part of Neighbourhood 7.

== History ==
The constituency was formed in 1988 and has been held by the ruling party from 1988 to 1991 when the People's Action Party lost the seat to Singapore Democratic Party's Cheo Chai Chen but Cheo lost to Ong Ah Heng of the People's Action Party in the 1997 Singapore general election. Ong was subsequently reelected in 2001 and 2006 before retiring in the 2011 general election. In 2011, the constituency was merged into Nee Soon Group Representation Constituency.

== Member of Parliament ==
Year	Member of Parliament	Party
1988	Ng Pock Too	PAP
1991	Cheo Chai Chen	SDP
1997	Ong Ah Heng	PAP

== Electoral results ==
Note: The Elections Department does not include rejected votes when calculating the vote shares of candidates. Hence, all candidates' vote shares will total to 100% at any given election (may not appear so in multi-way contests due to rounding).

=== Elections in 1980s ===
General Election 1988: Nee Soon Central
Party	Candidate	Votes	%	±%
PAP	Ng Pock Too	13,396	57.6	N/A
SDP	Cheo Chai Chen	8,944	38.5	N/A
United People's Front	Giam Lai Cheng	914	3.9	N/A
Majority		4,452	19.1	
Turnout		23,670	97.0	
PAP win (new seat)				

=== Elections in 1990s ===
General Election 1991: Nee Soon Central
Party	Candidate	Votes	%	±%
SDP	Cheo Chai Chen	12,709	50.3	+11.8
PAP	Ng Pock Too	12,541	49.7	−7.9
Majority		168	0.6	+19.7
Turnout		25,870	96.5	−0.5
SDP gain from PAP		Swing	+11.8	

General Election 1997: Nee Soon Central
Party	Candidate	Votes	%	±%
PAP	Ong Ah Heng	15,214	61.3	+11.6
SDP	Cheo Chai Chen	9,591	38.7	−11.6
Majority		5,623	22.6	+23.2
Turnout		25,335	96.5	+0.0
PAP gain from SDP		Swing	+11.6	

=== Elections in 2000s ===
General Election 2001: Nee Soon Central
Party	Candidate	Votes	%	±%
PAP	Ong Ah Heng	16,755	78.5	+17.2
SDP	Ling How Doong	4,583	21.5	−17.2
Majority		12,172	57.0	+34.4
Turnout		23,836	95.0	−1.5
PAP hold		Swing	+17.2	

General Election 2006: Nee Soon Central
Party	Candidate	Votes	%	±%
PAP	Ong Ah Heng	14,211	65.4	−13.1
WP	Lian Chin Way	7,529	34.6	+34.6
Majority		6,682	30.8	−26.2
Turnout		22,125	95.6	+0.6
PAP hold		Swing	-13.1	

== See also ==
- Nee Soon SMC
- Nee Soon GRC
- Nee Soon East SMC
- Nee Soon South SMC
