= Potong Pasir Single Member Constituency =

Electoral division in Singapore

Coordinates: 1.333°N 103.87°E

Potong Pasir
- Single-member constituency for the Parliament of Singapore
- Region: Central Region, Singapore
- Electorate: 30,971

Current constituency
- Created: 1968; 58 years ago
- Seats: 1
- Party: People's Action Party
- Member: Alex Yeo
- Town Council: Jalan Besar

The Potong Pasir Single Member Constituency (Note: Malay: Kawasan Undi Perseorangan Potong Pasir; Chinese: 波东巴西单选区; Tamil: பொத்தோங் பாசிர் தனித்தொகுதி) is a single-member constituency (SMC) situated in central Singapore. It is managed by Jalan Besar Town Council. The current Member of Parliament (MP) for the constituency is Alex Yeo from the People's Action Party (PAP).

== History ==
=== 1968–1976: Creation and WP contests ===
Potong Pasir Constituency was established prior to the 1968 general election; the PAP won uncontested.

In the 1972 and 1976 general elections, the Workers' Party (WP) challenged the PAP in the constituency, with the United National Front (UNF) also doing so in 1972; all three challenges were unsuccessful. For not obtaining at least 12.5% of the vote, the UNF also lost their electoral deposit of S$500.

=== 1979-84: By-election and Chiam's early bid ===
In 1979, as part of the seven by-elections that year, Chiam See Tong contested the constituency as an independent candidate against PAP newcomer Howe Yoon Chong, who called opposition candidates "court jesters" who had arrived "to provide comic relief". It was Chiam's first contest in his eventual safe seat, though he earlier made his debut in 1976 standing at Cairnhill He went on to defeat Chiam with 66.85% of the vote, retaining Potong Pasir for the PAP.

Ahead of the 1980 general election on 23 December, Chiam founded the Singapore Democratic Party (SDP) in the same year and rematched against Howe in the constituency under the SDP banner. The party was formally registered on 8 September.

In an election rally, Howe disparaged Chiam on his professional competence and was subsequently sued by Chiam for defamation. In response, Howe offered compensation which Chiam accepted; leading to the lawsuit being dropped. Howe won reelection with a decreased 59.05% of the vote.

=== 1984–2011: Chiam's era ===
==== 1984–1996: As member of SDP ====
Prior to the 1984 general election, Howe retired from politics, and PAP fielded debutant Mah Bow Tan to face off against Chiam Leading up to the election, then-Prime Minister Lee Kuan Yew compared Chiam and Mah's O-Level (GCE Ordinary Level) results in a rally speech, saying, "Mah Bow Tan, age 16, took his O-Levels — six distinctions, two credits. Mr Chiam, age 18 — six credits, one pass." The Prime Minister's Office later conveyed an apology from Lee for making an error about Chiam's results; Chiam had actually gotten seven credits. Chiam's bid paid off on his third attempt, having elected with 60.28% of the vote.

In 1988, the constituency was renamed Potong Pasir Single Member Constituency with the creation of group representation constituencies (GRCs). Chiam retained his seat with an improved 63.13% of the vote against PAP candidate Kenneth Chen Koon Lap.

In 1991, Chiam won reelection with 69.64% of the vote against PAP candidate Andy Gan. The 69.64% of the score was the largest score ever attained by any opposition candidate in post-independence to date, which remains unbeaten till this day. (Note: The WP's safe seat of Hougang SMC's highest score was however, 64.80%, which was set in the 2011 election.)

==== 1997–2001: Chee's handover and Chiam transition to SPP ====
In 1993, SDP had a change of leader when then-assistant secretary-general Chee Soon Juan staged a hunger strike to protest his dismissal from the National University of Singapore over research funds. Chiam was unsuccessful in censuring Chee after the CEC blocked the move. In response, Chiam resigned from his position as secretary-general on May 17, 1993; but retained his seat in Potong Pasir following a successful lawsuit, as the current constitution forces elected MPs to vacate their seats if one was removed from the party.

In December 1996, when Parliament was dissolved ahead of the 1997 general election, Chiam left the SDP and joined the Singapore People's Party (SPP), formed from a pro-Chiam former SDP faction which had left in 1994. He assumed leadership of the SPP and stood for reelection in Potong Pasir SMC under its banner, becoming the first SPP MP after winning 55.15% of the vote against Gan.

===== 2001–2010: SPP under the SDA =====
Prior to the 2001 general election, Chiam formed the Singapore Democratic Alliance (SDA), a political coalition comprising his SPP and three other opposition parties. In said election, Chiam and his PAP's candidate, Sitoh Yih Pin, tackled against the carrot and stick approach in their campaigning and municipal issues in the constituency, especially the developments for Potong Pasir MRT station at the time. Chiam won the election with 52.43% of the votes. In 2006, PAP offered a $80 million upgrade package to the Potong Pasir electorate and Sitoh a position in the Cabinet of Singapore if he wins the election. However, Chiam's vote share increased to 55.82% in a rematch.

On 28 February 2011, prior to the general election in the same year, the SDA removed Chiam from his position as chairperson of the coalition. Subsequently, on 2 March, Chiam announced that he would withdraw the SPP from the SDA.

=== 2011–present: Post-opposition era ===
==== 2011-25: Sitoh's win and ====
In the 2011 general election, Chiam did not stand for reelection in Potong Pasir SMC, instead leading an ultimately defeated five-member team to contest the neighbouring Bishan–Toa Payoh GRC. His wife, Lina Loh, (Note: Also known as Lina Chiam.) became the SPP candidate for the SMC; an election recount confirmed that Sitoh defeated her by 0.72% of the vote, or 114 votes. She was offered the first of three non-constituency MP (NCMP) seats issued after the election; she accepted with the wishes from the residents and supporters.

In the 2015 general election, Sitoh retained his seat with 66.41% of the vote in a rematch against Loh, who did not return to Parliament. As a result in 2017, Potong Pasir would be displaced from its record for being the longest-held opposition stronghold to another opposition safe seat, Hougang SMC, which it has been held since 1991 by the WP. Chiam was also displaced of being the longest-serving opposition MP that same year to WP's then-secretary-general Low Thia Khiang, who entered politics in 1991.

Prior to the 2020 general election, the first polling district of Potong Pasir SMC was transferred to the 4-member Bishan–Toa Payoh GRC; in return, the SMC absorbed the Joo Seng area of Marine Parade GRC. Sitoh defeated SPP candidate Jose Raymond with 60.67% of the vote, winning a third term in Potong Pasir SMC.

==== 2025: Population increase and handover ====
Interactive map of Potong Pasir SMC as of the 2025 general election

For the 2025 general election, after an increase in population due to Build-To-Order (BTO) developments in the Bidadari area under Potong Pasir SMC, the EBRC returned two of its polling districts to the new Marine Parade–Braddell Heights GRC, the successor to the now-defunct Marine Parade GRC. At that election, the SMC had 30,971 registered voters, an increase of 67% from 2020.

On 16 April, it was announced that Sitoh would retire from Parliament and that he would be replaced by Alex Yeo, a former branch secretary for Potong Pasir and former chairperson (Note: Another name for a "grassroots advisor", an individual appointed for "grassroots engagement and outreach" in a GRC division or SMC who, according to the People's Association (PA), has to be aligned with the "Government of the day". They do not need to be the elected MP for the area.) for the PAP in the Paya Lebar division of WP-held Aljunied GRC. On 22 April, the SPP announced that party treasurer Williamson Lee would contest the constituency. On nomination day, Lim Tean, secretary-general of the People's Alliance for Reform (PAR), a political coalition, was also nominated to contest the constituency, resulting in a three-way fight between the PAP, SPP and PAR. Yeo proceeded to win 69.2% of the vote against Lee's 22.46% and Lim's 8.33%.

== Member of Parliament ==
Year	Member	Party
Formation
1968	Sellappa Ramaswamy	PAP
1972	Baptist Ivan Cuthbert	PAP
1976	Baptist Ivan Cuthbert	PAP
1979	Howe Yoon Chong	PAP
1980	Howe Yoon Chong	PAP
1984	Chiam See Tong	SDP
1988	Chiam See Tong	SDP
1991	Chiam See Tong	SDP
1997	Chiam See Tong	SPP
2001	Chiam See Tong	SDA
2006	Chiam See Tong	SDA
2011	Sitoh Yih Pin	PAP
2015	Sitoh Yih Pin	PAP
2020	Sitoh Yih Pin	PAP
2025	Alex Yeo	PAP

== Electoral results ==
Note: The Elections Department does not include rejected votes when calculating the vote shares of candidates. Hence, all candidates' vote shares will total to 100% at any given election (may not appear so in multi-way contests due to rounding).

=== Elections in 1960s ===
General Election 1968
Party	Candidate	Votes	%	±%
PAP	Sellappa Ramaswamy	Unopposed		
Registered electors		11,782		
PAP win (new seat)				

=== Elections in 1970s ===
General Election 1972
Party	Candidate	Votes	%	±%
PAP	Baptist Ivan Cuthbert	7,772	66.22	N/A
WP	Rajaratnam Murugason	3,391	28.89	N/A
UNF	Harnek Singh	573	4.89	N/A
Majority		4,381	37.33	N/A
Total valid votes		11,736	97.88	N/A
Rejected ballots		254	2.12	N/A
Turnout		11,990	91.51	N/A
Registered electors		13,103		▲11.21
PAP hold		Swing	N/A	

General Election 1976
Party	Candidate	Votes	%	±%
PAP	Baptist Ivan Cuthbert	9,667	74.83	▲8.61
WP	Quek Doh Lam	3,252	25.17	▼3.72
Majority		6,415	49.66	▲12.33
Total valid votes		12,919	97.46	▼0.42
Rejected ballots		336	2.54	▲0.42
Turnout		13,255	93.56	▲2.05
Registered electors		14,167		▲8.12
PAP hold		Swing	▲8.6	

By-election 1979
Party	Candidate	Votes	%	±%
PAP	Howe Yoon Chong	9,056	66.9	▼7.9
Independent	Chiam See Tong	4,491	33.1	N/A
Majority		4,565	33.7	▼15.8
Total valid votes				
Rejected ballots				
Turnout		13,845	94.2	▲0.6
Registered electors				
PAP hold		Swing	▼7.9	

=== Elections in 1980s ===
General Election 1980
Party	Candidate	Votes	%	±%
PAP	Howe Yoon Chong	5,509	59.0	▼7.9
SDP	Chiam See Tong	3,821	41.0	▲7.9
Majority		1,688	18.0	▼31.6
Total valid votes				
Rejected ballots				
Turnout		9,486	94.2	▲0.6
Registered electors				
PAP hold		Swing	▼7.9	

General Election 1984
Party	Candidate	Votes	%	±%
SDP	Chiam See Tong	10,128	60.3	▲19.3
PAP	Mah Bow Tan	6,674	39.7	▼19.3
Majority		3,454	20.6	▲38.6
Total valid votes				
Rejected ballots				
Turnout		17,078	95.3	▲1.1
Registered electors				
SDP gain from PAP		Swing	▲19.3	

General Election 1988: Potong Pasir
Party	Candidate	Votes	%	±%
SDP	Chiam See Tong	11,804	63.1	▲2.8
PAP	Kenneth Chen Koon Lap	6,893	36.9	▼2.8
Majority		4,911	26.2	▲5.6
Total valid votes				
Rejected ballots				
Turnout		18,697	95.4	▲0.1
Registered electors				
SDP hold		Swing	▲2.8	

=== Elections in 1990s ===
General Election 1991: Potong Pasir
Party	Candidate	Votes	%	±%
SDP	Chiam See Tong	12,582	69.64	▲6.5
PAP	Andy Gan	5,486	30.36	▼6.5
Majority		7,096	39.2	▲13.0
Total valid votes				
Rejected ballots				
Turnout		18,325	95.1	▼0.3
Registered electors				
SDP hold		Swing	▲6.5	

General Election 1997: Potong Pasir
Party	Candidate	Votes	%	±%
SPP	Chiam See Tong	9,709	55.15	▼14.49
PAP	Andy Gan	7,895	44.85	▲14.4
Majority		1,814	10.30	N/A
Total valid votes				
Rejected ballots				
Turnout		17,884	95.1	0
Registered electors				
SPP gain from SDP		Swing	▼14.4	

=== Elections in 2000s ===
General Election 2001: Potong Pasir
Party	Candidate	Votes	%	±%
SDA	Chiam See Tong	8,107	52.43	▼2.72
PAP	Sitoh Yih Pin	7,356	47.57	▲2.8
Majority		751	4.8	▼5.6
Total valid votes				
Rejected ballots				
Turnout		15,463	98.9	▲3.8
Registered electors				
SDA gain from SPP		Swing	▼2.8	

General Election 2006: Potong Pasir
Party	Candidate	Votes	%	±%
SDA	Chiam See Tong	8,245	55.82	▲3.39
PAP	Sitoh Yih Pin	6,527	44.18	▼3.4
Majority		1,718	11.6	▲6.8
Total valid votes				
Rejected ballots				
Turnout		14,958	94.1	▼4.8
Registered electors				
SDA hold		Swing	▲3.4	

=== Elections in 2010s ===
General Election 2011: Potong Pasir
Party	Candidate	Votes	%	±%
PAP	Sitoh Yih Pin	7,990	50.35	▲6.17
SPP	Lina Chiam	7,880	49.65	▼6.17
Majority		110	0.7	▲12.4
Total valid votes				
Rejected ballots				
Turnout		16,112	93.0	▼1.1
Registered electors				
PAP gain from SPP		Swing	▲6.2	

General Election 2015
Party	Candidate	Votes	%	±%
PAP	Sitoh Yih Pin	10,581	66.41	▲16.05
SPP	Lina Chiam	5,353	33.59	▼16.05
Majority		5,228	32.10	▲31.30
Total valid votes		15,934	98.61	
Rejected ballots		224	1.39	
Turnout		16,158	92.82	▼0.18
Registered electors		17,407		
PAP hold		Swing	▲16.05	

=== Elections in 2020s ===
General Election 2020
Party	Candidate	Votes	%	±%
PAP	Sitoh Yih Pin	11,264	60.67	▼5.74
SPP	Jose Raymond	7,302	39.33	▲5.74
Majority		3,962	21.34	
Total valid votes		18,566	98.52	
Rejected ballots		279	1.48	
Turnout		18,845	95.51	▲2.69
Registered electors		19,731		▲13.35
PAP hold		Swing	▼5.74	

General Election 2025
Party	Candidate	Votes	%	±%
PAP	Alex Yeo	19,288	69.20	▲8.53
SPP	Williamson Lee	6,261	22.46	▼16.86
PAR	Lim Tean	2,323	8.33	N/A
Majority		13,027	46.74	▲25.40
Total valid votes		27,872	98.09	▼0.43
Rejected ballots		544	1.91	▲0.43
Turnout		28,416	91.75	▼3.76
Registered electors		30,971		▲56.97
PAP hold		Swing	▲8.53	
