= Pre-election day events of the 2015 Singaporean general election =

== New candidates/Outgoing MPs ==
Below is a summary for the political parties with parliamentary presence from GE2011.

=== New candidates ===
A list containing 72 new candidates contesting in the election for the first time, were reflected on the table.

Name	Age	Occupation	Party	Contested Constituency
Abu Mohamed	64	Company director	Singapore Democratic Alliance	Pasir Ris–Punggol GRC
Mohamad Abdillah Zamzuri	31	Manager	Singapore People's Party	Bishan–Toa Payoh GRC
Amrin Amin	37	Law solicitor, Watson, Farley & Williams Asia Practice LLP	People's Action Party	Sembawang GRC
Cheryl Chan Wei Ling	39	Head of Shipping Industry, Linde plc, nephew of Chan Choy Siong	People's Action Party	Fengshan SMC
Chee Hong Tat	41	Former Second Permanent Secretary (Trade & Industry)	People's Action Party	Bishan–Toa Payoh GRC
Bernard Chen Jia Xi	29	Project executive	Workers' Party	MacPherson SMC
Cheng Li Hui	39	Deputy CEO, Hai Leck Holdings Limited	People's Action Party	Tampines GRC
Chirag Praful Desai	38	Market risk manager	Singaporeans First	Tanjong Pagar GRC
Chong Kee Hiong	49	Chief Executive Officer, OUE Hospitality	People's Action Party	Bishan–Toa Payoh GRC
Chong Wai Fung	45	Healthcare administrator	Singapore Democratic Party	Holland–Bukit Timah GRC
Choong Hon Heng	45	Business administrator	National Solidarity Party	Tampines GRC
Melvin Chiu Weng Hoe	36	Sales executive	Singaporeans First	Tanjong Pagar GRC
Chua Eng Leong	44	Private banker, Standard Chartered Private Bank; son of former Cabinet Minister Chua Sian Chin	People's Action Party	Aljunied GRC
Damanhuri Abas	45	Education consultant	Singapore Democratic Party	Marsiling–Yew Tee GRC
Darryl David Wilson	45	Former Mediacorp television celebrity and deputy director, Temasek Polytechnic (School of Design)	People's Action Party	Ang Mo Kio GRC
Mohamad Fahmi Ahmad Rais	48	Sales trainer	Singaporeans First	Tanjong Pagar GRC
Mohamed Fairoz Shariff	36	Former associate librarian	Workers' Party	East Coast GRC
Firuz Khan Moklis Khan	48	Factory owner	Workers' Party	Marine Parade GRC
David Foo Ming Jin	51	Chemist	Singaporeans First	Jurong GRC
Kenneth Foo Sek Kuan	38	Sales manager	Workers' Party	Nee Soon GRC
Jaslyn Go Hui Leng	42	Businesswoman	Singapore Democratic Party	Yuhua SMC
Daniel Goh Pei Siong	42	Associate Professor, National University of Singapore	Workers' Party	East Coast GRC
Gurmit Singh Sadhu Singh	55	Legal counsel	Workers' Party	Nee Soon GRC
Han Hui Hui	24	Activist	Independent	Radin Mas SMC
He Ting Ru	32	Legal counsel	Workers' Party	Marine Parade GRC
Gerous Khung Wai Yeen	34	Account manager	Singapore Democratic Party	Bukit Panjang SMC
Luke Koh Tiong Yee	40	Managing partner	Workers' Party	Nee Soon GRC
Henry Kwek Hian Chuan	39	Executive Director, Foodtraco Supplies	People's Action Party	Nee Soon GRC
Law Him Kwee	55	Director	Singapore People's Party	Bishan–Toa Payoh GRC
Lee Hong Chuang	45	Former national gymnast and Senior Technology Manager, IBM	People's Action Party	Hougang SMC
Augustin Lee Tze Shih	42	Property consultant	People's Power Party	Chua Chu Kang GRC
Lim Tean	50	Lawyer and legal consultant	National Solidarity Party	Tampines GRC
Kevryn Lim Tong Zhe	27	Project Director	National Solidarity Party	Sembawang GRC
Cheryl Loh Xiu Wen	32	Sales Consultant	Workers' Party	Nee Soon GRC
Don Bryan Long Yaoguang	38	Technology Entrepreneur	Singapore People's Party	Bishan–Toa Payoh GRC
Jesse Loo Hoe Bock	52	Finance Administrator	Reform Party	Ang Mo Kio GRC
Janet Low Wai Choo	55	Finance Manager	People's Power Party	Chua Chu Kang GRC
Victor Joseph Lye Thiam Fatt	53	Chief Executive Officer and chairman, National Council Against Drug Abuse	People's Action Party	Aljunied GRC
Ravi Madasamy	46	Activist and Legal executive	Reform Party	Ang Mo Kio GRC
Kumjan Muralidharan Pillai	48	Lawyer, Rajah & Tann	People's Action Party	Aljunied GRC
Ng Chee Meng	47	Former Chief of Defence Force	People's Action Party	Pasir Ris–Punggol GRC
Dylan Ng Foo Eng	40	Banker	Workers' Party	Marine Parade GRC
Louis Ng Kok Kwang	37	Founder, Animal Concerns Research and Education Society (ACRES)	People's Action Party	Nee Soon GRC
Roy Ngerng Yi Ling	34	Activist and former Healthcare Worker	Reform Party	Ang Mo Kio GRC
Ong Teik Seng	44	Sales Consultant	Singapore Democratic Alliance	Pasir Ris–Punggol GRC
Paul Anantharajah Tambyah	50	University Lecturer	Singapore Democratic Party	Holland–Bukit Timah GRC
Ravi Chandran Philemon	46	Former executive director	Singapore People's Party	Hong Kah North SMC
Joan Cheng Sim Pereira	47	Assistant general manager, Temasek Cares	People's Action Party	Tanjong Pagar GRC
Leon Anil Perera	44	Assistant head, Economic Development Board	Workers' Party	East Coast GRC
Rahayu Mahzam	35	Lawyer, Heng, Leong & Srinivasan	People's Action Party	Jurong GRC
Redzwan Hafidz Razak	30	Engineer	Workers' Party	Jalan Besar GRC
Saktiandi Supaat	41	Executive vice-president of global banking, of Maybank	People's Action Party	Bishan–Toa Payoh GRC
Samir Salim Neji	45	Managing director	Independent	Bukit Batok SMC
Shamsul Kamar Mohamad Razali	43	Former head of School Department	People's Action Party	Aljunied GRC
Muhamed Sidek Mallek	55	Auditor	Singapore Democratic Party	Holland–Bukit Timah GRC
Adrian Sim Tian Hock	43	Businessman	Workers' Party	Jalan Besar GRC
Siva Chandran	32	Media trainer	Reform Party	Ang Mo Kio GRC
Darren Soh Guan Soon	45	Property agent	Reform Party	West Coast GRC
Sukhdev Singh Gill	64	Former police officer	Singaporeans First	Jurong GRC
Sun Xueling	36	Investment director, Temasek International	People's Action Party	Pasir Ris–Punggol GRC
Ron Tan Jun Yen	30	Property agent	Workers' Party	Nee Soon GRC
Terence Tan Li Chern	44	Lawyer	Workers' Party	Marine Parade GRC
Dennis Tan Lip Fong	45	Shipping lawyer, DennisMathiew	Workers' Party	Fengshan SMC
Tan Peng Ann	67	Social entrepreneur	Singaporeans First	Jurong GRC
Tan Wu Meng	39	Medical oncologist, Parkway Cancer Centre	People's Action Party	Jurong GRC
Gregory Wong Chee Wai	44	Technology consultant	Singaporeans First	Jurong GRC
Wong Soon Hong	57	Sales director	Singaporeans First	Jurong GRC
Wong Souk Yee	56	Lecturer	Singapore Democratic Party	Marsiling–Yew Tee GRC
Wong Way Weng	53	Quality assurance manager	Singapore Democratic Alliance	Pasir Ris–Punggol GRC
Yee Chia Hsing	44	Head of Bank Department	People's Action Party	Chua Chu Kang GRC
Eugene Yeo Ren Yuan	40	Associate Director	National Solidarity Party	Sembawang GRC
Melvin Yong Yik Chye	43	Former Assistant Commissioner, Singapore Police Force	People's Action Party	Tanjong Pagar GRC

=== Outgoing MPs ===
A list containing 15 outgoing MPs, all were from PAP, who was either deceased or stepped down on their constituencies, were reflected in the table.

Deceased
Name	Constituency (Division)	Highest Portfolio Attained in 12th Parliament	Remarks
Lee Kuan Yew	Tanjong Pagar GRC (Tanjong Pagar-Tiong Bahru)	Member of Parliament	Lee was the first prime minister (1959-90) and secretary-general (1954-92); Lee died during his term on 23 March 2015 and Indranee Rajah substituted Lee's duties until end of term.
Retiring
Name	Constituency (Division)	Highest Portfolio Attained in 12th Parliament	Remarks
Arthur Fong	West Coast GRC (Clementi)	Member of Parliament	Fong's ward was carved to Jurong GRC.
Hawazi Daipi	Sembawang GRC (Marsiling)	Senior Parliamentary Secretary (Education and Manpower)	Daipi's ward was carved to Marsiling–Yew Tee GRC.
Hri Kumar Nair	Bishan–Toa Payoh GRC (Thomson-Toa Payoh)	Member of Parliament	
Inderjit Singh	Ang Mo Kio GRC (Kebun Baru)	Member of Parliament	Inderjit's ward was carved to Nee Soon GRC.
Ellen Lee	Sembawang GRC (Woodlands)	Member of Parliament	
Raymond Lim	East Coast GRC (Fengshan)	Former Cabinet Minister	Lim's ward was carved as a SMC.
Penny Low	Pasir Ris–Punggol GRC (Punggol North)	Member of Parliament	
Lui Tuck Yew	Moulmein–Kallang GRC (Moulmein)	Minister for Transport	Lui's ward was carved to Bishan–Toa Payoh, Holland–Bukit Timah, Jalan Besar and Tanjong Pagar GRCs.
Mah Bow Tan	Tampines GRC (Tampines East)	Former Cabinet Minister	
Irene Ng	Tampines GRC (Tampines Changkat)	Member of Parliament	
Seng Han Thong	Ang Mo Kio GRC (Yio Chu Kang)	Member of Parliament	
Wong Kan Seng	Bishan–Toa Payoh GRC (Bishan East)	Former Deputy Prime Minister	
Alvin Yeo	Chua Chu Kang GRC (Nanyang)	Member of Parliament	
Zainudin Nordin	Bishan–Toa Payoh GRC (Toa Payoh East)	Former Central CDC Mayor	

== Pre-nomination day ==
Below here are all the events that occurred before Nomination Day on 1 September 2015.

- PAP – People's Action Party
- DPP – Democratic Progressive Party
- NSP – National Solidarity Party
- PPP – People's Power Party
- RP – Reform Party
- SDA – Singapore Democratic Alliance
- SDP – Singapore Democratic Party
- SF – Socialist Front
- SingFirst – Singaporeans First
- SPP – Singapore People's Party
- WP – Workers' Party

Date	Party	Events
13 July		Prime Minister Lee Hsien Loong announces in Parliament that he had convened the Electoral Boundaries Review Committee two months prior. He had instructed the committee to create smaller Group Representation Constituencies, and to have at least 12 Single Member Constituencies.
16 July	PPP	Former National Solidarity Party secretary-general Goh Meng Seng, who recently founded his party, People's Power Party on 19 May this year, was registered.
24 July		The Electoral Boundaries Review Committee publishes report on new electoral boundaries.
24 July	PAP	Inderjit Singh, Member of Parliament of Ang Mo Kio GRC, became the first incumbent to announce retirement through Facebook. PAP organising Secretary and Defence Minister Ng Eng Hen commented that Singh would prefer MPs to announce their retirement in a more dignified manner.
26 July	WP	WP plans to contest 28 seats (increase of five from 2011), slightly under one-third of the 89 parliamentary seats.
27 July		The Elections Department announced that revised registers of electors are open for public inspection.
31 July		Chief of Singapore Armed Forces Ng Chee Meng became the first high-ranked three-star general to enter politics, upon announcing his retirement from SAF with effect from 18 August; Ng later told the media prior to the Change of Command Parade, mentioned that how he was "indebted to Singapore", was his purpose on joining politics.
2 August	NSP	NSP announces its intention to field Nicole Seah as a candidate; Seah however confirmed with the media later that day that she would neither run in the election nor rejoining NSP.
3 August	DPP; NSP; PPP; RP; SDA; SDP; SingFirst; SPP; WP	Opposition parties held their first horse-trading talks at the NSP headquarters. The host party had responded to a request by Reform Party to shift the meeting from its intended date of 31 July.
4 August		Second Permanent Secretary (Trade & Industry) Chee Hong Tat announced his resignation from civil service.
5 August	PAP	Tin Pei Ling, Marine Parade GRC MP gave birth to first child. Emeritus Senior Minister and MP of Marine Parade GRC Goh Chok Tong paid a hospital visit and announces that Tin will stand for election in the recently carved MacPherson SMC.
5 August	WP	Low Thia Khiang, party's Secretary-General and Aljunied GRC MP, announced that he will defend his seat, quashing rumours that he might lead a team to contest other GRCs, but he declined to reveal the full line-up for Aljunied.
6 August	DPP; NSP; PPP; RP; SDA; SDP; SingFirst; SPP	Opposition parties, except WP, held second horse-trading talks ahead of GE. Party chairwoman Sylvia Lim later explained to the media that it was not productive for the party to attend further talks. Reform Party secretary-general Kenneth Jeyaretnam walks out of the meeting within 15 minutes.
6 August		Tan Lam Siong announced his intention to stand in Potong Pasir SMC, creating a possibility of a three-cornered contest in this GE, and the first possible Independent to stand since the 2001 elections.
7 August	PAP	Tampines GRC former Cabinet Minister Mah Bow Tan and MP Irene Ng, and Sembawang GRC MP and Education and Manpower Senior Parliamentary Secretary Hawazi Daipi, announced their retirement.
8 August	PAP	Jurong GRC MP and Deputy Prime Minister Tharman Shanmugaratnam announced the changes in the west: incumbent Speaker Halimah Yacob would move to the newly formed Marsiling–Yew Tee GRC, while West Coast GRC MP Arthur Fong would retire.
11 August	PAP	Transport Minister and Moulmein–Kallang GRC MP Lui Tuck Yew became the first cabinet minister to announce his retirement from politics. Lui cited that it seemed like "obituaries and eulogies without the flowers", while referring to the outpour of support after his announcement.
12 August	PAP	Organising Secretary and Defence Minister Ng Eng Hen announces that the ruling party will formally unveil its entire slate of candidates before the National Day Rally (which will be held on 23 Aug); the first slate of candidates was for his ward, Bishan–Toa Payoh GRC, where he and Senior Minister of State Josephine Teo would remain in the ward; former Deputy Prime Minister Wong Kan Seng, and MPs Hri Kumar Nair and Zainudin Nordin would retire and were respectively replaced by Chong Kee Hiong, Chee Hong Tat and Saktiandi Supaat. Departing from its traditional practice of introducing candidates at its party headquarters, the party held its conference in a local coffee shop instead.
12 August	WP	Low Thia Khiang announces that WP would unveil its own slate of candidates before Nomination Day, but would not indicate where the candidates would be standing.
12 August	WP	Sylvia Lim posted an image of her eating oyster omelette at a hawker centre at Bedok North Street 4 (situated at Fengshan SMC) on Instagram with the captions "The taste of Fengshan - heavenly!". However, Lim also confirmed later that month that she would remain in Aljunied GRC while another WP candidate would contest Fengshan SMC instead.
13 August		Melvin Yong, director of Singapore Police Force (Public Affairs Department), announced that he would step down from the sector. Reports from Straits Times imply that Yong might stood as a candidate in Tanjong Pagar GRC under the PAP banner.
14 August	PAP	PAP unveiled candidates for Sembawang GRC: Minister for National Development and party chairman Khaw Boon Wan will lead their team; Amrin Amin and Ong Ye Kung (who previously contested in Aljunied GRC in 2011 election) would join the team; incumbents Vikram Nair and Lim Wee Kiak (from Nee Soon GRC) also remained, while Senior Parliament Secretary Hawazi Daipi and MP Ellen Lee steps down, and Ong Teng Koon was transferred to Marsiling–Yew Tee GRC.
14 August		Singapore Police Force announced that election rallies and seventh month festival getai shows must be kept separate, following news that at least two political parties had intended to engage getai performers to perform at election rallies.
15 August	PAP	PAP unveiled candidates for three electoral divisions: Ang Mo Kio GRC would continue to be helmed by Secretary-General and Prime Minister Lee Hsien Loong, along with incumbents Ang Hin Kee, Intan Azura Mokhtar, and Gan Thiam Poh (a Pasir Ris–Punggol GRC MP). The new faces were Darryl David, and Koh Poh Koon (who previously contested Punggol East SMC in the 2013 by-election). Incumbent Yeo Guat Kwang was announced to be fielded in another constituency, while Inderjit Singh and Seng Han Thong step down.; Hougang SMC: Lee Hong Chuang, was announced as the new candidate to contest the WP-held ward.; Sengkang West SMC: Minister of State and Incumbent MP Lam Pin Min, would be defending his seat.
15 August	PAP	East Coast GRC MP and former cabinet minister Raymond Lim announced his retirement. His ward of Fengshan, was carved as a SMC prior to his announcement.
16 August	PAP	PAP unveiled candidates for four electoral divisions: Chua Chu Kang GRC: Health Minister Gan Kim Yong, Mayor and Parliamentary Secretary Low Yen Ling and MP Zaqy Mohamad would remain in this GRC. Newcomer Yee Chia Hsing would replace retiring MP Alvin Yeo, while incumbent Alex Yam (along with his Yew Tee division) was moved to Marsiling–Yew Tee GRC.; Jalan Besar GRC: The team consist of Communications and Information Minister Yaacob Ibrahim, Senior Minister of State Heng Chee How, Mayor Denise Phua and Tanjong Pagar GRC MP Lily Neo.; Pioneer SMC: Incumbent Cedric Foo, would be defending his seat.; West Coast GRC: Trade and Industry Minister Lim Hng Kiang, and PMO Minister S Iswaran, would lead the ward; Nee Soon GRC MP Patrick Tay and incumbent MP Foo Mee Har formed as a team; Arthur Fong announced his retirement early; Culture, Community and Youth Minister Lawrence Wong would be transferred to Marsiling–Yew Tee GRC.
16 August	WP	WP announced that all of the seven elected MPs from the last General Election (and the two by-elections) would be defending their respective wards: Aljunied GRC: Chen Show Mao, Sylvia Lim, Low Thia Khiang, Muhamad Faisal Manap and Pritam Singh; Hougang SMC: Png Eng Huat; Punggol East SMC: Lee Li Lian
17 August	PAP	PAP announced incumbent Potong Pasir SMC MP, Sitoh Yih Pin, to be defending his seat.
18 August		National University of Singapore held a political dialogue, where population issues – including influx of foreign workers – took centrestage. Other issues include the Aljunied–Hougang-Punggol East Town Council saga and transportation. The party representatives include: Democratic Progressive Party Benjamin Pwee, Workers' Party Gerald Giam, People's Power Party Goh Meng Seng, Singapore Democratic Alliance Harminder Singh, Singapore People's Party Jeannette Chong-Aruldoss, Reform Party Kenneth Jeyaretnam, Singapore Democratic Party Paul Tambyah, National Solidarity Party Steve Chia, People's Action Party Sim Ann and Singaporeans First Tan Jee Say.
18 August	PAP	PAP launched a mobile app, the first time in the election's history any political party had done so.
19 August	PAP	PAP unveiled candidates for two electoral divisions: Radin Mas SMC: Minister of State and incumbent MP Sam Tan Chin Siong, would be defending his seat.; Tanjong Pagar GRC: PMO Minister and National Trades Union Congress Secretary-General Chan Chun Sing, Senior Minister of State Indranee Rajah, and Chia Shi-Lu would remain in the ward; Joan Pereira and Melvin Yong would be new candidates standing for the ward. Incumbent MPs Lee Kuan Yew earlier died on 23 March, and Lily Neo was moved to Jalan Besar GRC.
19 August	NSP	NSP announced their intention to contest MacPherson SMC, creating possibly the second three-cornered fight this GE. Acting Secretary-General Hazel Poa resigns from NSP within hours of the announcement, citing Poa had strongly opposed with Steve Chia's decision to contest MacPherson SMC.
20 August	PAP	PAP unveiled candidates for two electoral divisions: Jurong GRC: Deputy Prime Minister and Finance Minister Tharman Shanmugaratnam, will lead his team which consist of incumbent MPs Ang Wei Neng and Minister of State Desmond Lee, along with new candidates Rahayu Mahzam and Tan Wu Meng. Incumbent MP and Speaker Halimah Yacob was transferred to Marsiling Yew-Tee GRC.; Bukit Batok SMC: Incumbent MP David Ong would be defending his seat; earlier from the announcement, Bukit Batok SMC was carved from Jurong GRC.
20 August	SDP	SDP criticized Media Development Authority on the classification of their satire video Pappy Washing Powder, as a "party political film". SDP lodged an appeal but MDA dismissed it two days later.
20 August		Elections Department announced changes made to the Ballot paper, which will include candidates' photos, and raising the spending limit from S$3.50 to S$4.
21 August	PAP	PAP unveiled candidates for four electoral divisions: Hong Kah North SMC: Senior Minister of State for Health and Manpower and incumbent MP Amy Khor, will be defending her seat.; MacPherson SMC: Incumbent MP Tin Pei Ling will be defending her seat; earlier from the announcement, MacPherson SMC was carved from Marine Parade GRC.; Marsiling–Yew Tee GRC: The team will be led by four incumbents: Culture, Community and Youth Minister and West Coast GRC MP Lawrence Wong, Speaker and Jurong GRC MP Halimah Yacob, Chua Chu Kang GRC MP Alex Yam, and Sembawang GRC MP Ong Teng Koon.; Mountbatten SMC: Incumbent MP Lim Biow Chuan will be defending his seat.
21 August	SDA	Singapore Democratic Alliance was the first party to publish its manifesto, hoping to "build a Singapore for Singaporeans". Issues highlighted include: The Population White Paper, Central Provident Fund (CPF) and retirement, as well as, housing, healthcare costs, public transport, employment and education.
22 August	PAP	PAP unveiled candidates for five electoral divisions: Bukit Panjang SMC: Mayor and Incumbent MP Teo Ho Pin will be defending his seat.; Holland–Bukit Timah GRC: All four incumbents of the ward would be defending their seats, which consist of Environment Minister Vivian Balakrishnan, Minister of State of Education & Communications and Information Sim Ann, Christopher de Souza, and Liang Eng Hwa.; Pasir Ris–Punggol GRC: Deputy Prime Minister Teo Chee Hean, Mayor and Minister of State for Trade and Industry Teo Ser Luck, Zainal Sapari and Janil Puthucheary would remain in their wards; Ng Chee Meng and Sun Xueling would respectively replace retiring MP Penny Low and now-Ang Mo Kio GRC MP Gan Thiam Poh.; Tampines GRC: Education Minister Heng Swee Keat, PMO Minister Masagos Zulkifli, and Baey Yam Keng remained in this GRC; retiring incumbents Mah Bow Tan and Irene Ng were respectively replaced by new candidate Cheng Li Hui and Desmond Choo (who previously contested in Hougang SMC in the 2011 general and 2012 by-election).; Yuhua SMC: PMO Minister and incumbent MP, Grace Fu will be defending her seat.
22 August	SPP	SPP announced Ravi Philemon as Hong Kah North SMC's candidate.
22 August	SDP	SDP opened its new office at Ang Mo Kio Street 62 and announces that it is “good and ready to go” for the election.
23 August	NSP	Steve Chia announced that he would not run in the election, citing that "the trolls have won" and online abuse.
23 August		Prime Minister Lee Hsien Loong held his annual National Day Rally in ITE College Central; during his rally, he told the audience that he would be holding an election soon, and he asked for their mandate and "to take Singapore into our next phase".
24 August	NSP	The party's Central Executive Council member Mohamed Fazli Talip became the second member within a week to resign from NSP.
25 August		At about 3pm, President of Singapore Tony Tan, under the advice of the Prime Minister Lee, dissolves the 12th Parliament. About an hour later, the writ of election was issued, adjourning the dates of Nomination and Polling to be held on 1 and 11 September, respectively.
25 August		Ng Wai Choong, Energy Market Authority's Chief Executive, would be appointed as Returning Officer.
25 August		Elections Department published a 67-page Parliamentary Election Candidates 2015 handbook, advising candidates against "negative campaigning practices". Candidates or polling agents can observe the process to transport sealed ballot boxes from the polling stations to counting centres. In addition, drones are not allowed at rallies.
25 August	SDP	SDP unveiled their first two candidates via live-streaming on YouTube: Chong Wai Fung and Khung Wai Yeen.
26 August	PAP	PAP unveiled candidates for two electoral divisions: Marine Parade GRC: Moulmein–Kallang GRC MP Edwin Tong would join in alongside Minister for Social and Family Development Tan Chuan-Jin, Emeritus Senior Minister Goh Chok Tong, Deputy Speaker Seah Kian Peng and Fatimah Lateef.; Nee Soon GRC: Foreign and Law Minister K Shanmugam, Lee Bee Wah and Parliamentary Secretary Muhammad Faishal Ibrahim remained as incumbents; the new candidates were Louis Ng and Henry Kwek.
26 August	WP	WP unveiled its campaign theme, "Empower your future". Secretary-General Low Thia Khiang quoted as saying, "What we need to succeed in future may not be the same as what we depended on in the past".
26 August	WP	WP unveiled four more candidates: Daniel Goh Pei Siong, Redzwan Hafidz Abdul Razak, Dylan Ng Foo Eng and previously-contested candidate Koh Choong Yong.
26 August	SDP	SDP unveiled two more candidates: Jaslyn Go and Paul Tambyah.
26 August	RP	RP indicated their intention to contest Pioneer SMC should NSP withdrew from contesting, in a response following Steve Chia's withdrawal.
26 August	DPP; PPP; RP; SDA; SF	Five opposition parties launched the Vote for Change campaign, as a sign of unity among alternative parties and urge supporters to purchase a badge with the VFC acronym; Organisers told to the media that WP and SPP declined their invitation.
27 August	PAP	PAP unveiled candidates for three electoral divisions: East Coast GRC: All four incumbents of the ward would be defending their seats, which consist of Manpower Minister Lim Swee Say, Senior Minister of State for Trade and Industry and National Development Lee Yi Shyan, Mayor and Minister of State for National Development and Defence, Mohamad Maliki Osman, and Jessica Tan.; Fengshan SMC: Cheryl Chan, was announced as the new candidate to contest the ward.; Punggol East SMC: Deputy Speaker and Joo Chiat SMC MP, Charles Chong, was announced as the candidate, marking the first time an incumbent MP contested in an opposition-held ward.; 84 candidates have been unveiled by the ruling party at this point, with the exception of the opposition-held Aljunied GRC.
27 August	RP	RP unveils its first group of candidates: Radin Mas SMC: Previously contested candidate Kumar Appavoo would be the candidate for the ward.; West Coast GRC: Their team consist of Secretary-General Kenneth Jeyaretnam, party chairman Andy Zhu, Darren Soh and Noraini Yunus.
27 August	SDP	SDP unveiled two more candidates: John Tan and Sidek Mallek.
28 August	WP	WP candidate Daniel Goh lodged a police report after reported that Goh categorically refute baseless allegations' of an extra-marital affair in a letter addressed to the party and the media.
28 August	WP	WP unveiled four more candidates: Ron Tan, He Ting Ru, Adrian Sim, and previously contested candidate L Somasundaram.
28 August	PAP	PAP unveiled their final five candidates who would contest the opposition-held Aljunied GRC: Ang Mo Kio GRC MP Yeo Guat Kwang would lead along new candidates Chua Eng Leong, Victor Lye, K Muralidharan Pillai, and Shamsul Kamar. Serangoon representative Chan Hui Yuh chose not to run the elections and backed the PAP team.
28 August	RP	RP unveiled their team for Ang Mo Kio GRC: M Ravi, Roy Ngerng, Gilbert Goh, Osman Sulaiman, Jesse Loo and Siva Chandran.
28 August	SDP	SDP unveiled two more candidates: Damanhuri Abas and previously contested candidate Bryan Lim, who contested Hong Kah GRC in 2001.
28 August	SingFirst	SingFirst unveiled their first five of ten candidates: Secretary-General Tan Jee Say, Fahmi Rais, Gregory Wong Chee Wai, Chirag Desai, and Melvyn Chiu Weng Hoe.
28 August		At 5pm, at the time of the closing of applications of Political Donation Certificate (mandatory item for all candidates), Elections Department revealed that 220 applications were received, on par with the 220 it received from the 2011 elections.
29 August	PAP	PAP launches its 88-page manifesto themed, "With you. For you. For Singapore".
29 August	WP	WP launches its 46-page manifesto themed, "Empower your future"; WP also released their mobile app.
29 August	SingFirst	SingFirst introduces the other five candidates: Party chairman Ang Yong Guan (also a former SDP candidate), Tan Peng Ann, David Foo Ming Jin, Sukdeu Singh, and Wong Soon Hong.
29 August	SDP	SDP unveiled their final three candidates: Wong Souk Yee, and previously contested candidates Sadasivam Veriyah and the party's secretary-general Chee Soon Juan, the latter returning to the political arena after a 14-year hiatus.
29 August	DPP; SPP	DPP's secretary-general Benjamin Pwee and chairman Hamin Aliyas resign to return to SPP, backing their team to contest Bishan–Toa Payoh GRC with SPP candidates.
30 August	WP	WP unveiled four more candidates: Kenneth Foo Seck Guan, Dennis Tan Lip Fong, Gurmit Singh, and Mohamed Fairoz Shariff.
30 August	SPP	SPP's Secretary-General Chiam See Tong, announced that he will not run in the elections, ending a 39-year political career since his first contest in the 1976 elections. SPP also unveiled three candidates for the Bishan–Toa Payoh GRC team: Bryan Long, Law Kim Hwee, and Abdillah Zamzuri.
31 August	NSP	Lim Tean was appointed as the new Acting Secretary-General.
31 August	WP	WP unveiled its final three candidates: Leon Perera, Bernard Chen Jia Xi and previously contested candidate Frieda Chan.
31 August	SDA	SDA unveiled their Pasir Ris–Punggol GRC team, which consist of secretary-general Desmond Lim, Harminder Pal Singh, Ong Teik Seng, Wong Way Weng, Abu Mohamed and Arthero Lim.

== Nomination day and campaigning events ==
Date	Party	Events
1 September		At 7am, Tam Lam Siong pulls out of three-cornered fight at Potong Pasir SMC.
1 September		At 9am, nine nomination centres open to parties and public. The nominations were open for an hour later at 11am.
1 September		At 12.45pm, Singapore Police Force published a list of rally sites.
1 September		At the close of nominations at 1pm, Elections Department confirmed a combined 179 candidates (representing in nine parties) and two independents would be contesting all of the 29 constituencies and 89 parliamentary seats, marking the first time in post-independence Singapore (and since the 1963 elections) with an all-contest and no uncontested walkovers.
1 September	PAP	At 5pm, PAP's secretary-general Lee Hsien Loong held their media conference at its headquarters.
1 September	NSP; PAP; RP; SDP; SingFirst; WP	MediaCorp hosted two 'live' forums featuring the six parties with the largest slates of candidates, with PAP (89), WP (28), NSP (12), SDP (11), RP (11) and SingFirst (10). (See Political debate)
2 September		Media Development Authority announced the details of Party Political Broadcasts on free-to-air radio and television. Parties fielding at least six candidates are eligible for air time. The broadcasts was scheduled to broadcast on 3 and 10 Sep.
2 September		Elections Department announced the debut of sample counts: a sample of 100 polling papers from each polling station will be sampled and weighed according to the size of the ballots; the results would be released via website and on broadcast by the assistant returning officer, and counting continues until all of the votes had been tabulated. ELD also highlighted that sample counts help to prevent speculation and misinformation before the official results are announced.
2 September	NSP	NSP launched its six-page manifesto "Singaporeans Deserve Better", which focused on job protection for locals, over-population, CPF withdrawal limits and widening inequality gap.
3 September		Elections Department announced a list of ten overseas polling locations where a significant number of Singaporeans are present: Dubai, London, Tokyo, Beijing, Washington D.C., Hong Kong, Shanghai, San Francisco, New York and Canberra. A total of 4,868 voters were cast overseas.
3 September	SDP	SDP's chief Chee Soon Juan received a standing ovation during his speeches on his first rally at Bukit Gombak Stadium, as it was Chee's first election in which he was eligible to stand since 2001.
3 September	SPP	SPP launched its 8-point manifesto, highlighting employment, healthcare, transport, education, housing and CPF issues.
3 September	Independent	Independent candidate Han Hui Hui was briefly heckled by a crowd member in her first of the two rallies while asking the residents of Radin Mas SMC to vote for her, which went viral. The person was later revealed to be Jeremy Tan, a future independent candidate who later contested Mountbatten SMC in 2025, who confirmed his actions according to his Instagram.
3 September		At 8pm, the first round of party political broadcasts was aired on free-to-air television and radio channels (See Political party broadcasts)
3 September	PAP; NSP	MacPherson SMC NSP candidate Cheo Chai Chen posted a Facebook post citing PAP candidate Tin Pei Ling's role as a mother is a weakness, in which Tin refuted on a separate post the day after. Tin was backed by ministers Ng Eng Hen and Grace Fu thereafter, so was NSP's Sembawang GRC candidate Kevryn Lim. Cheo later admitted that remark was a joke on the following day, whose supporters shun him.
7 September	RP	RP launched its publishes 12-page manifesto titled "A Brighter Future Tomorrow, Today", which highlights include minimum wage, reducing National Service to one year and capping the number of foreign workers.
7 September		Singapore Police Force released a list of 18 designated assembly centres, with applications opened for two days to the Political parties.
7 September	PAP	A speech delivered by Prime Minister Lee Hsien Loong during the lunchtime rally, on the last day of campaigning, asked voters to back the right party so the country would continue to succeed for the next 50 years.
8 September	NSP	In a Sembawang GRC rally by Choong Hong Heng, a Tampines GRC candidate, he gave a thumb signal for praising a good result and loudly booed the PAP, both of which went viral online.
9 September	PAP; WP	Punggol East SMC candidate Charles Chong distributed flyers in the constituency alleging that the WP had "lost" $22.5 million of town council funds. WP later responded in a statement, refuting the claim.
10 September		At 9pm, the Second round of party political broadcasts was aired on free-to-air television and radio channels (See Political party broadcasts)

=== Political debate ===
Debates were live telecast on 1 September 2015. Two round table debates each airing for an hour were held with a moderator on the current issues in Singapore, broadcast in Chinese at 7 pm in Chinese on Channel 8 and Capital 95.8FM and in English at 8 pm on Channel 5 and CNA938. A rerun of the English broadcast was broadcast at 9 pm on CNA. The candidates that participated in the debate were:

2015 Singaporean general election debates
No.	Date & Time	Broadcaster	Language	Moderator	Participants					
Key: P Present A Absent					PAP	WP	NSP	SDP	RP	SingFirst
1	1 September; 7:00 p.m.–8:00 p.m.	Mediacorp Channel 8 Capital 95.8FM	Chinese	Chun Geuk Lay	P Chan C. S. Sim A.	P Koh C. Y.	P Teo K. Y.	P Lim B. H.	P Soh G. S.	P Ang Y. G.
2	1 September; 8:00 p.m.–9:00 p.m.	Mediacorp Channel 5 CNA938	English	Steve Chia	P Wong S. T. Phua L. P.	P Perera	P Lim T.	P Chee S. J.	P Jeyaretnam	P Tan J. S.

=== Political party broadcasts ===
Since the 1980 General Election, political parties fielding at least six candidates under a recognised party symbol are eligible for air-time. Time allocation is based on the number of candidates fielded.

Party	Time allocated (minutes)
SDA	2.5
SPP	3
SingFirst	3
RP	3
SDP	3
NSP	3.5
WP	5.5
PAP	13

==== Broadcast 1–3 September 2015 ====
Party	English Channel 5, Channel NewsAsia, 938LIVE & Power 98FM	Mandarin Channel 8, Channel U, Capital 95.8FM, 88.3 Jia FM & UFM 100.3	Malay Suria & Warna 94.2FM	Tamil Vasantham & Oli 96.8FM
SDA	Harminder Pal Singh	Arthero Lim	Abu Mohamed	no Tamil broadcast
SPP	Lina Chiam	no Mandarin broadcast	Mohamad Abdillah Zamzuri	Ravi Philemon
SingFirst	Tan Jee Say	Ang Yong Guan	Fahmi Ahmad Rais	no Tamil broadcast
RP	Kenneth Jeyaretnam	Darren Soh	Noraini Yunus	M Ravi
SDP	Chee Soon Juan	Jaslyn Go	Mohamad Sidek Mallek	Sadasivam Veriyah
NSP	Lim Tean	Sebastian Teo	Nor Lella Mardiiah Mohamed	no Tamil broadcast
WP	Daniel Goh	Lee Li Lian	Mohamed Fairoz Shariff	L. Somasundram
PAP	Lee Hsien Loong	Lim Swee Say	Yaacob Ibrahim	S. Iswaran

==== Broadcast 2–10 September 2015 ====
Party	English Channel 5, Channel NewsAsia, 938LIVE & Power 98FM	Mandarin Channel 8, Channel U, Capital 95.8FM, 88.3 Jia FM & UFM 100.3	Malay Suria & Warna 94.2FM	Tamil Vasantham & Oli 96.8FM
SDA	Harminder Pal Singh	Arthero Lim	Abu Mohamed	no Tamil broadcast
SingFirst	Tan Jee Say	Ang Yong Guan	Mohamad Fahmi Rais	no Tamil broadcast
SPP	Did not participate			
RP	Roy Ngerng	Darren Soh	Osman Sulaiman	Siva Chandran
SDP	Paul Tambyah	Khung Wai Yeen	Damanhuri Abas	Sadasivam Veriyah
NSP	Lim Tean	Sebastian Teo	Nor Lella Mardiiah Mohamed	no Tamil broadcast
WP	Sylvia Lim	Low Thia Khiang	Faisal Manap	L Somasundram
PAP	Lee Hsien Loong	Lim Swee Say	Yaacob Ibrahim	S. Iswaran

=== Election rallies ===
The Singapore Police Force published a list of sites (The Speakers' Corner at Hong Lim Park would not serve as an "unrestricted area") available for electoral meetings on the nomination day on 1 September, and rallies could be held during the campaigning period (2 to 9 September) between 7am to 10pm.

Electoral division	Rally site	Assembly centre	Remarks
Aljunied GRC	Open field near Defu Avenue 1 and 10		
Aljunied GRC	Serangoon Stadium	Eastern region	
Ang Mo Kio GRC	Open field near Buangkok Crescent Block 982		
Ang Mo Kio GRC	Yio Chu Kang Stadium	Central region	
Bishan-Toa Payoh GRC	Bishan Stadium	Central region	
Bishan-Toa Payoh GRC	Toa Payoh Stadium	Central region	
Bukit Batok SMC	Open field near Toh Guan Road Block 265		
Bukit Panjang SMC	Open field near Petir Road Block 136		
Chua Chu Kang GRC	Bukit Gombak Stadium	Western region	
Chua Chu Kang GRC	Chua Chu Kang Secondary School		
East Coast GRC	Bedok Stadium	Eastern region	
East Coast GRC	Open field near Simei Road Block 155		
Fengshan SMC	Open field near Bedok North Bus Depot		
Holland-Bukit Timah GRC	Open field near Commonwealth MRT station		
Holland-Bukit Timah GRC	Open field near Clementi Avenue 6 Block 204		
Hong Kah North SMC	Open field near former Hong Kah Primary School		
Hougang SMC	Open field near Hougang Central Block 837	Eastern region	Hougang Stadium (situated at Ang Mo Kio GRC) was used for Assembly centre.
Jalan Besar GRC	Open field near Boon Keng Road Block 4		
Jalan Besar GRC	Open field near Jalan Tenteram Block 16		
Jurong GRC	Jurong Stadium	Western region	
Jurong GRC	Open field near Boon Lay Way		
MacPherson SMC	Open field bounded by PIE, Paya Lebar and Circuit Roads		
Marine Parade GRC	Open field opposite Eunos Crescent Block 33		
Marine Parade GRC	Open field near Ubi Avenue 1 Block 33		
Marsiling-Yew Tee GRC	Choa Chu Kang Stadium	Western region	
Marsiling-Yew Tee GRC	Woodlands Stadium	Central region	
Mountbatten SMC	Open field bounded by Stadium Drive and Stadium Boulevard	Eastern region	
Nee Soon GRC	Open field along Yishun Avenue 6 Block 389		
Nee Soon GRC	Yishun Stadium	Central region	
Pasir Ris-Punggol GRC	Open field near Buangkok MRT station		
Pasir Ris-Punggol GRC	Pasir Ris Park		
Pioneer SMC	Jurong West Stadium	Western region	
Potong Pasir SMC	Open field opposite Potong Pasir Avenue 1 Block 120		
Punggol East SMC	Open field near Punggol Field Walk Block 128C		
Radin Mas SMC	Delta Hockey Pitch		
Sembawang GRC	Open field near Woodlands Drive 16 Block 540		
Sembawang GRC	Open field near Woodlands Drive 75 Block 687A		
Sengkang West SMC	Open field opposite Anchorvale Lane Block 312		
Tampines GRC	Open field near Tampines Street 81 Block 895A		
Tampines GRC	Ngee Ann Secondary School		
Tanjong Pagar GRC	Open sports field near MOE (21 Evans Road)		
Tanjong Pagar GRC	Queenstown Stadium	Central region	
West Coast GRC	Clementi Stadium	Western region	
West Coast GRC	Open field near West Coast Park		
Yuhua SMC	Jurong East Stadium	Western region	
Lunchtime Election Meeting	Promenade area besides UOB Plaza	—N/a	

Unless otherwise stated, all rallies below are held between 7pm to 10pm; a Lunchtime Rally that were held between 12pm to 2pm are highlighted. Cancelled rallies are highlighted in grey.

Date	Party/Alliance	Electoral Division	Rally site	Refs
2 September	People's Action Party	Radin Mas SMC	Delta Hockey Pitch	
2 September	Workers' Party	Hougang SMC	Open field near Hougang Central Block 837	
3 September	People's Action Party	East Coast GRC	Bedok Stadium	
3 September	People's Action Party	Pasir Ris-Punggol GRC	Open field near Buangkok MRT station	
3 September	Singapore Democratic Party	Chua Chu Kang GRC	Bukit Gombak Stadium	
3 September	Singaporeans First	Jurong GRC	Jurong Stadium	
3 September	Workers' Party	Jalan Besar GRC	Open field near Boon Keng Road Block 4	
3 September	Independent candidate (Han Hui Hui)	Radin Mas SMC	Delta Hockey Pitch	
4 September	National Solidarity Party	Sembawang GRC	Open field near Woodlands Drive 75 Block 687A	
4 September	People's Action Party	Aljunied GRC	Open field near Defu Avenue 1 and 10	
4 September	People's Action Party	Fengshan SMC	Open field near Bedok North Bus Depot	
4 September	People's Power Party	Chua Chu Kang GRC	Bukit Gombak Stadium	
4 September	Reform Party	Ang Mo Kio GRC	Yio Chu Kang Stadium	
4 September	Singapore Democratic Alliance	Pasir Ris-Punggol GRC	Pasir Ris Park	
4 September	Singapore Democratic Party	Bukit Panjang SMC	Open field near Petir Road Block 136	
4 September	Singapore People's Party	Bishan-Toa Payoh GRC	Toa Payoh Stadium	
4 September	Workers' Party	Nee Soon GRC	Yishun Stadium	
5 September	National Solidarity Party	Tampines GRC	Open field near Tampines Street 81 Block 895A	
5 September	People's Action Party	Bukit Panjang SMC	Open field near Petir Road Block 136	
5 September	People's Action Party	Chua Chu Kang GRC	Chua Chu Kang Secondary School	
5 September	Reform Party	West Coast GRC	Clementi Stadium	
5 September	Singapore Democratic Party	Holland-Bukit Timah GRC	Open field near Commonwealth MRT station	
5 September	Singaporeans First	Tanjong Pagar GRC	Queenstown Stadium	
5 September	Singapore People's Party	Hong Kah North SMC	Open field near former Hong Kah Primary School	
5 September	Workers' Party	Punggol East SMC	Open field near Punggol Field Walk Block 128C	
6 September	Reform Party	Radin Mas SMC	Delta Hockey Pitch	
6 September	Singapore Democratic Party	Yuhua SMC	Jurong East Stadium	
6 September	Singapore People's Party	Mountbatten SMC	Open field bounded by Stadium Drive and Stadium Boulevard	
6 September	Workers' Party	East Coast GRC	Open field near Simei Road Block 155	
7 September	National Solidarity Party	MacPherson SMC	Open field bounded by PIE, Paya Lebar and Circuit Roads	
7 September	People's Action Party	Holland-Bukit Timah GRC	Open field near Commonwealth MRT station	
7 September	People's Action Party	Sembawang GRC	Open field near Woodlands Drive 16 Block 540	
7 September	People's Action Party	Yuhua SMC	Jurong East Stadium	
7 September	People's Power Party	Chua Chu Kang GRC	Chua Chu Kang Secondary School	
7 September	Singapore Democratic Alliance	Pasir Ris-Punggol GRC	Open field near Buangkok MRT station	
7 September	Singapore Democratic Party	Lunchtime Election Meeting	Promenade area besides UOB Plaza	
7 September	Singapore Democratic Party	Bukit Batok SMC	Open field near Toh Guan Road Block 265	
7 September	Singaporeans First	Jurong GRC	Open field near Boon Lay Way	
7 September	Workers' Party	Marine Parade GRC	Open field near Ubi Avenue 1 Block 33	
8 September	National Solidarity Party	Sembawang GRC	Open field near Woodlands Drive 75 Block 687A	
8 September	People's Action Party	Lunchtime Election Meeting	Promenade area besides UOB Plaza	
8 September	People's Action Party	Bishan-Toa Payoh GRC	Toa Payoh Stadium	
8 September	People's Action Party	Hong Kah North SMC	Open field near former Hong Kah Primary School	
8 September	People's Action Party	Mountbatten SMC	Open field bounded by Stadium Drive and Stadium Boulevard	
8 September	People's Action Party	Nee Soon GRC	Yishun Stadium	
8 September	People's Action Party	Pasir Ris-Punggol GRC	Pasir Ris Park	
8 September	People's Action Party	Tampines GRC	Ngee Ann Secondary School	
8 September	Singapore Democratic Party	Marsiling-Yew Tee GRC	Woodlands Stadium	
8 September	Singapore People's Party	Potong Pasir SMC	Open field opposite Potong Pasir Avenue 1 Block 120	
8 September	Workers' Party	Aljunied GRC	Serangoon Stadium	
8 September	Independent candidate (Han Hui Hui)	Radin Mas SMC	Delta Hockey Pitch	
9 September	National Solidarity Party	Tampines GRC	Ngee Ann Secondary School	
9 September	People's Action Party	Bukit Panjang SMC	Open field near Petir Road Block 136	
9 September	People's Action Party	East Coast GRC	Open field near Simei Road Block 155	
9 September	People's Action Party	Jalan Besar GRC	Open field near Boon Keng Road Block 4	
9 September	People's Action Party	MacPherson SMC	Open field bounded by PIE, Paya Lebar and Circuit Roads	
9 September	People's Action Party	Marsiling-Yew Tee GRC	Woodlands Stadium	
9 September	People's Action Party	Potong Pasir SMC	Open field opposite Potong Pasir Avenue 1 Block 120	
9 September	People's Power Party	Chua Chu Kang GRC	Chua Chu Kang Secondary School	
9 September	Reform Party	Ang Mo Kio GRC	Open field near Buangkok Crescent Block 982	
9 September	Reform Party	~~Radin Mas SMC~~	~~Delta Hockey Pitch~~	Cancelled
9 September	Singapore Democratic Alliance	Pasir Ris-Punggol GRC	Pasir Ris Park	
9 September	Singapore Democratic Party	Holland-Bukit Timah GRC	Open field near Clementi Avenue 6 Block 204	
9 September	Singaporeans First	Tanjong Pagar GRC	Queenstown Stadium	
9 September	Singapore People's Party	Bishan-Toa Payoh GRC	Bishan Stadium	
9 September	Workers' Party	East Coast GRC	Bedok Stadium	
