= List of Catholic High School alumni =

Catholic High School (CHS) is a government-aided autonomous Catholic boys' school in Bishan, Singapore, founded in 1935 by a French missionary, Reverend Father Edward Becheras. One of the Special Assistance Plan schools in Singapore, it has a primary school section offering a six-year primary education, as well as a secondary school section offering a four-year secondary education.

The following is a list of notable alumni from Catholic High School, Singapore.

== Politics ==
- Lee Hsien Loong, Senior Minister of Singapore and third Prime Minister of Singapore
- Gan Kim Yong, Deputy Prime Minister of Singapore and Minister for Trade and Industry
- Lim Swee Say, Former Minister for Manpower and Member of Parliament
- Shawn Huang, Senior Parliamentary Secretary and Member of Parliament for West Coast-Jurong West GRC
- Baey Yam Keng, Member of Parliament for Tampines GRC
- Desmond Choo, Member of Parliament for Tampines Changkat SMC
- Chan Soo Sen, Former Member of Parliament for Joo Chiat SMC
- Chen Show Mao, Former opposition Member of Parliament for Aljunied GRC.
- Lee Chiaw Meng, Former Minister for Education, former Minister for Science and Technology
- Jamus Lim, Member of Parliament for Sengkang GRC
- Ow Chin Hock, Former Member of Parliament for Leng Kee SMC
- Fong Sip Chee, Former Minister of State for Culture
- Chan Chee Seng, Former Senior Parliamentary Secretary: Finance, Trade and Industry, Internal Affairs and Education

== Public service ==
- Chao Hick Tin, Former Court of Appeal judge
- Hoo Cher Mou, Former Chief of Air Force

== Academia and research ==
- Chao Tzee Cheng, Forensic Pathologist
- Chong Chi Tat, Mathematics Professor at the National University of Singapore
- Su Guaning, Former President of Nanyang Technological University

== Business ==
- Lee Hsien Yang, Former Chairman of the Civil Aviation Authority of Singapore

== Media and entertainment ==
- Edmund Chen, actor
- Kuo Pao Kun, playwright, theatre director and arts activist
- Liang Wern Fook, singer and composer
- Gen Neo, singer-songwriter, producer and composer
- Elvin Ng, actor
- Cliff Tan, architect and author
- Tay Ping Hui, actor
- Chua Ek Kay, artist

== Sports ==
- Kendrick Lee, national badminton player
- Gabriel Quak, national football player
- Timothee Yap, national sprinter
