= North East Community Development Council =

Community development council in Singapore

Coordinates: 1°22′10″N 103°56′49″E

Type
- Type: Local authority of the North East District

Leadership
- Mayor: Baey Yam Keng
- General Manager: Kelvin Thong
- Seats: 18

Website
- northeast.cdc.gov.sg

North East District of Singapore

The North East Community Development Council is one of five Community Development Councils (CDCs) set up across the Republic of Singapore to aid in local administration of governmental policies and schemes. They are funded in part by the government although they are free to engage in fund-raising activities.

== Constituencies ==
As of May 2025, the North East district covers:

=== Single Member Constituency (SMC) ===
- Tampines Changkat SMC

=== Group Representation Constituency (GRC) ===
- Pasir Ris–Changi GRC
  - Changi
  - Pasir Ris Central
  - Pasir Ris East
  - Pasir Ris West
- Punggol GRC
  - Punggol Coast
  - Punggol North
  - Punggol Shore
  - Punggol West
- Sengkang GRC
  - Sengkang Central (Note: Identified in the Sengkang Town Council as Buangkok.)
  - Sengkang East (Note: Identified in the Sengkang Town Council as Rivervale.)
  - Sengkang North (Note: Identified in the Sengkang Town Council as Compassvale.)
  - Sengkang West (Note: Identified in the Sengkang Town Council as Anchorvale.)
- Tampines GRC
  - Tampines Boulevard
  - Tampines Central
  - Tampines East
  - Tampines North
  - Tampines West

== Results of CDC by election ==
The North East CDC is notable for being the most populated CDC among the heartland areas and was the only CDC with an opposition representation since the formation of the CDC. Nonetheless, the PAP vote share combined in North East CDC was within the national average in each election, due to fierce competition against various oppositions throughout its lifetime, notably Workers' Party. While 2011 was the first election where WP won Aljunied GRC and 2020 with Sengkang GRC, 2025 actually polled a lower vote share as compared to the aforementioned two.

Year	Constituencies (GRC seats in parenthesis)	Seat composition		Electorate		PAP vote share	
Year	Constituencies (GRC seats in parenthesis)	Total	Contested	Total	Contested	Total votes	Vote share
2001	Aljunied (5), Hougang, Pasir Ris-Punggol (5), Tampines (5)	16 / 84	6 / 16	408,001	148,735	95,797	68.87%
2006	Aljunied (5), Hougang, Pasir Ris-Punggol (6), Tampines (5)	17 / 84	17 / 17	473,506	473,506	276,849	63.27%
2011	Aljunied (5), Hougang, Pasir Ris-Punggol (6), Punggol East, Tampines (5)	18 / 87	18 / 18	507,492	507,492	258,109	55.11%
2015	Aljunied (5), Hougang, Pasir Ris-Punggol (6), Punggol East, Tampines (5)	18 / 89	18 / 18	537,619	537,619	314,437	63.29%
2020	Aljunied (5), Hougang, Pasir Ris-Punggol (5), Punggol West, Sengkang (4), Tampines (5)	21 / 93	21 / 21	628,119	628,119	333,695	54.75%
2025	Pasir Ris-Changi (4), Punggol (4), Sengkang (4), Tampines (5), Tampines Changkat	18 / 97	18 / 18	523,422	523,422	260,635	53.85%

== Mayors ==
The incumbent Mayor of North East District is MP of Tampines GRC Baey Yam Keng from the People's Action Party since 2025.

#	Name	Start of term	End of term	Political Party
1	Zainul Abidin	24 November 2001	30 May 2009	People's Action Party
2	Teo Ser Luck	31 May 2009	26 May 2017	People's Action Party
3	Desmond Choo	27 May 2017	23 May 2025	People's Action Party
4	Baey Yam Keng	23 May 2025	Incumbent	People's Action Party

== See also ==
- Community Development Council
