= Masagos Zulkifli =

Singaporean politician (born 1963)

The Honourable Masagos Zulkifli
- ماسڬوس ذوالكفل
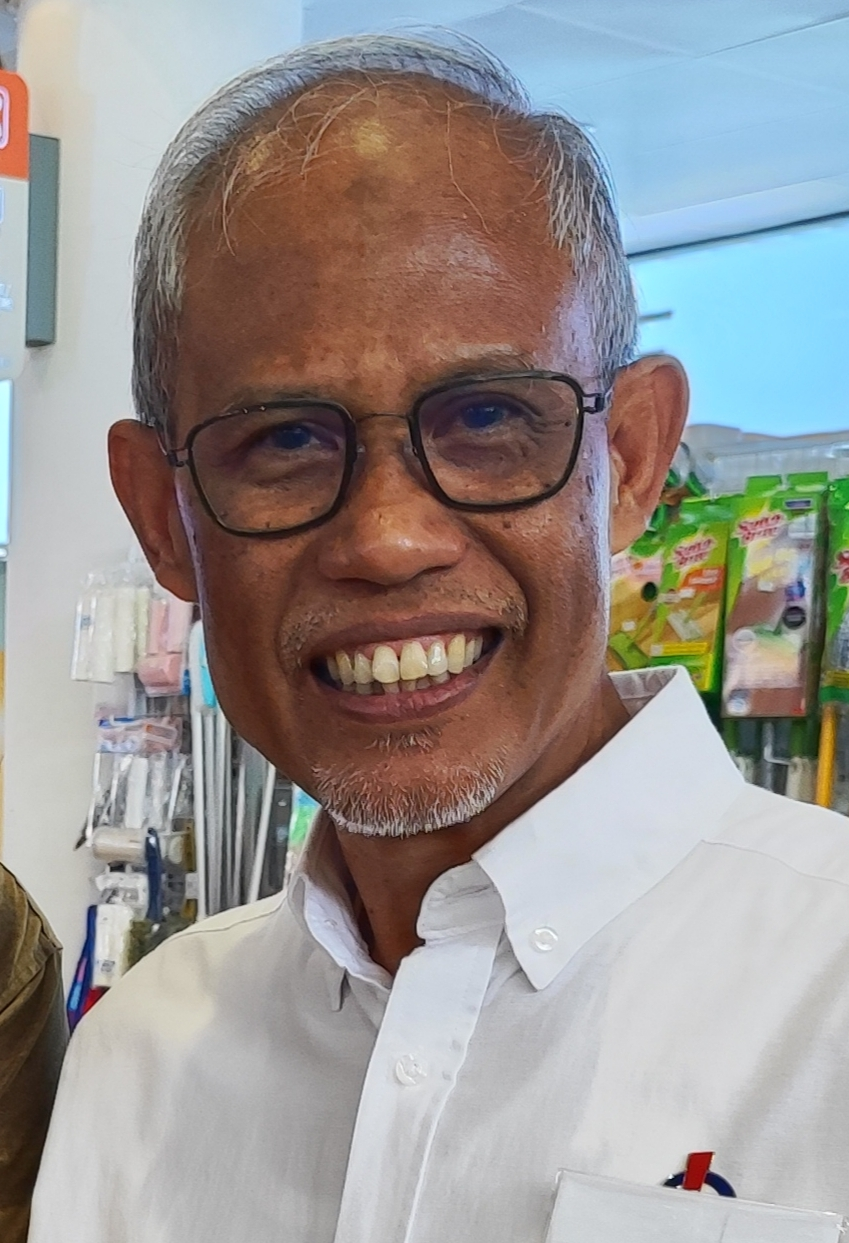
- Masagos in 2025

Vice-Chairman of the People's Action Party
- Incumbent
- Assumed office 23 November 2018
- Secretary-General: Lee Hsien Loong; Lawrence Wong
- Chairman: Gan Kim Yong (2018–2022); Heng Swee Keat (2022–2025); Desmond Lee (2025–present)

Minister for Social and Family Development
- Incumbent
- Assumed office 27 July 2020
- Prime Minister: Lee Hsien Loong; Lawrence Wong
- Preceded by: Desmond Lee

Second Minister for Health
- In office 27 July 2020 – 23 May 2025
- Prime Minister: Lee Hsien Loong; Lawrence Wong
- Minister: Gan Kim Yong (2020–2021); Ong Ye Kung (2021–present)

Minister-in-charge of Muslim Affairs
- In office 1 May 2018 – 22 May 2025
- Prime Minister: Lee Hsien Loong; Lawrence Wong
- Preceded by: Yaacob Ibrahim
- Succeeded by: Muhammad Faishal Ibrahim (acting)

Minister for the Environment and Water Resources
- In office 1 October 2015 – 26 July 2020
- Prime Minister: Lee Hsien Loong
- Preceded by: Vivian Balakrishnan
- Succeeded by: Grace Fu (as Minister for Sustainability and Environment)

Minister in the Prime Minister's Office
- In office 9 April 2015 – 30 September 2015
- Prime Minister: Lee Hsien Loong
- Succeeded by: Josephine Teo; Desmond Lee

Second Minister for Foreign Affairs
- In office 9 April 2015 – 30 September 2015 Serving with Grace Fu
- Prime Minister: Lee Hsien Loong
- Minister: K. Shanmugam
- Succeeded by: Josephine Teo

Second Minister for Home Affairs
- In office 9 April 2015 – 30 September 2015 Serving with S. Iswaran
- Prime Minister: Lee Hsien Loong
- Minister: Teo Chee Hean
- Preceded by: K. Shanmugam
- Succeeded by: Desmond Lee (2017)

Member of Parliament for Tampines GRC
- Incumbent
- Assumed office 6 May 2006
- Preceded by: PAP held
- Majority: 2006: 43,428 (37.02%); 2011: 18,347 (14.44%); 2015: 58,282 (44.12%); 2020: 46,793 (32.82%); 2025: 6,392 (4.65%)

Personal details
- Born: Masagos Zulkifli bin Masagos Mohamad; 16 April 1963 (age 63) Colony of Singapore
- Party: People's Action Party
- Education: Nanyang Technological University; National University of Singapore; University of Southern California
- Occupation: Politician; former electrical engineer

Masagos Zulkifli bin Masagos Mohamad (Note: Jawi: ماسڬوس ذوالكفل بن ماسڬوس محمد) (born 16 April 1963) is a Singaporean politician who has served as the vice-chairperson of the People's Action Party since 2025 and has been serving as Minister for Social and Family Development since 2020. A member of the People's Action Party (PAP), he has been the Member of Parliament (MP) for the Tampines West division of Tampines Group Representation Constituency (GRC) since 2006.

Before joining politics, Masagos was an electrical engineer and had held key positions in Singtel. He made his debut in the political scene after winning the 2006 general election as part of a five-member PAP team contesting in Tampines GRC. Since then, he has won three subsequent elections and has held various positions in the ministries of Home Affairs, Foreign Affairs and Health. On 9 April 2015, Masagos was appointed Minister in the Prime Minister's Office. His appointment marked the first time in Singaporean history when there were two Malay ministers in the Cabinet. On 1 October 2015, Masagos took up the portfolio of Minister for Environment and Water Resources.

== Early life ==
Masagos was educated at Bukit Panjang Government High School and National Junior College before he went to Nanyang Technological University, where he graduated in 1988 with a Bachelor of Engineering (First Class Honours), majoring in electrical and electronic engineering. In 1994, he obtained a Master of Science in electrical engineering from the National University of Singapore. His first job was with Singtel in 1988. In 1995, he completed a Master of Business Administration at the University of Southern California on a postgraduate scholarship awarded by Singtel. He was later appointed Chief Executive Officer of SingTel Global Offices.

== Political career ==
Masagos made his debut in politics in the 2006 general election when he contested as part of a five-member People's Action Party team in Tampines Group Representation Constituency (GRC). The PAP team won about 68% of the vote, and Masagos became a Member of Parliament representing the Tampines West ward of Tampines GRC. He was subsequently appointed Senior Parliamentary Secretary in the Ministry of Education on 2 June 2006, and concurrently Senior Parliamentary Secretary in the Ministry of Home Affairs on 1 April 2008. On 1 November 2010, he was promoted to Minister of State in these two ministries.

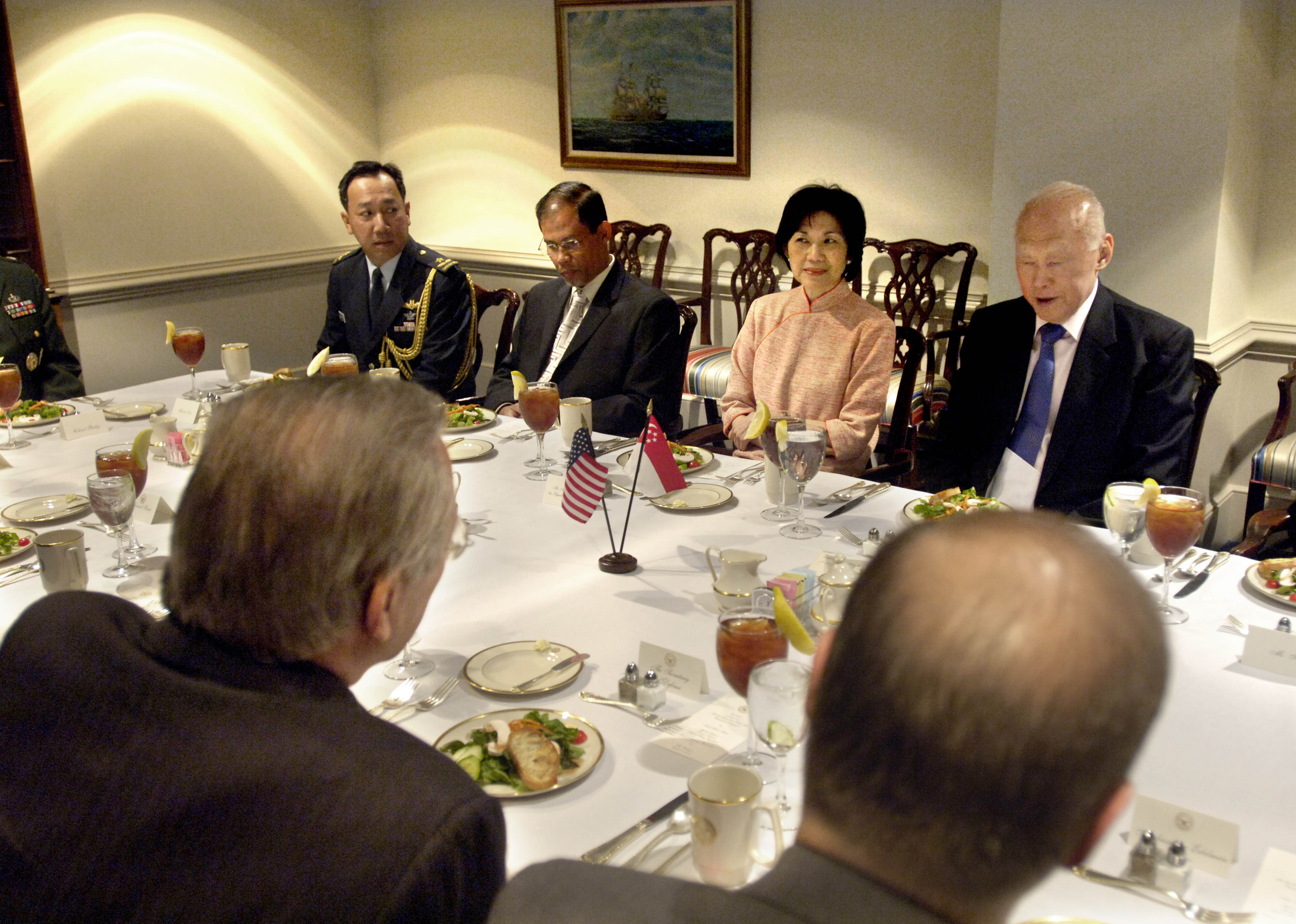
Masagos (back, second from left), then Senior Parliamentary Secretary for Education, at a working lunch hosted by United States Secretary of Defense Donald Rumsfeld in The Pentagon on 17 October 2006. With him are (left to right) Singapore Embassy Defence Attaché Brigadier-General Richard Lim Keng Yong, Singapore Ambassador to the United States Chan Heng Chee, and Minister Mentor Lee Kuan Yew.

Masagos was re-elected in Tampines GRC in the 2011 general election. On 21 May 2011, he was appointed Minister of State for Home Affairs and Foreign Affairs. On 1 August 2012, he was promoted to Senior Minister of State in these two ministries.

On 9 April 2015, Masagos was promoted to a full Minister as a Minister in the Prime Minister's Office. The position was without portfolio. This was the first time in Singaporean history when there were two Malay ministers in the Cabinet, the other being Yaacob Ibrahim. Masagos was also promoted to Second Minister for Home Affairs and Second Minister for Foreign Affairs, and was put in charge of leading the PAP team in Tampines GRC. On the same day, Prime Minister Lee Hsien Loong said that Masagos's elevation to full Minister reflected the "progress of the Malay community" in Singapore. Masagos also said that he was honoured to have been appointed and that "[h]aving two Malay full ministers in the Cabinet for the first time in our nation's history reflects the [Government's] trust and recognition of the good progress made by the Malay-Muslim community".

On 1 October 2015, Masagos took up the portfolio of Minister for Environment and Water Resources. From 1 May 2018, he was given an additional appointment as Minister-in-Charge of Muslim Affairs, taking over from Yaacob Ibrahim. On 27 July 2020, he changed his portfolio to Minister for Social and Family Development and took up an additional portfolio as Second Minister for Health, while concurrently holding the position of Minister-in-charge of Muslim Affairs.

From July 2023, Masagos took over Cheng Li Hui’s formal duties at Tampines East Division in Tampines GRC after her resignation following an extramarital affair until the 2025 general elections. This arrangement remained until the 2025 general election.

In May 2025, Masagos was replaced by Muhammad Faishal Ibrahim as Acting Minister-in-Charge of Muslim Affairs and left his post as Second Minister of Health while retaining his portfolio as Minister for Social and Family Development.

== Controversies ==
=== Hijab in healthcare services ===
In March 2021, Workers' Party MP Faisal Manap advocated for the use of the tudung as part of the nurse's uniform for Muslim women in medical institutions. Masagos responded that "allowing tudungs will raise a very visible religious marker that identifies every tudung-wearing female nurse or uniform officer as a Muslim. This has significant implications… We don't want patients to prefer or not prefer to be served by a Muslim nurse, nor do we want people to think that public security is being enforced by a Muslim or non-Muslim officer." Additionally, Masagos urged such discussion on religious matters to be done "behind closed doors".

Masagos' statement was criticised by opposition politicians who viewed it as disallowing the hijab for certain vocations, such as those in healthcare, despite the fact that the Muslim community advocated for a more open workplace. In a survey by Rice Media, 93% of respondents indicated that they were not bothered if "people in uniformed services are visibly wearing religious markers like hijabs, turbans and crosses."

In response to Masagos' point on "closed-door discussions", Faisal rebuked that he was not privy to them and felt that "all elected Malay MPs should be part of this closed-door discussion" rather than only PAP MPs, as it was at that moment. Faisal added that he "would like to offer [himself] to the PAP ministers to be part of this closed-door discussion."

== Notes ==
Political offices
Preceded by Lim Swee Say; S. Iswaran; Grace Fu	Minister in the Prime Minister's Office; 2015; Served alongside: Lim Swee Say, S. Iswaran, Grace Fu, Chan Chun Sing	Succeeded by Chan Chun Sing
Preceded by Vivian Balakrishnan	Minister for the Environment and Water Resources; 2015–2020	Succeeded by Grace Fu as Minister for Sustainability and the Environment
Preceded by Yaacob Ibrahim	Minister-in-charge of Muslim Affairs; 2018–2025	Succeeded by Muhammad Faishal Ibrahim (Acting)
Preceded by Desmond Lee	Minister for Social and Family Development; 2020–present	Incumbent
Vacant	Second Minister for Health; 2020–2025	Vacant
Parliament of Singapore
Preceded by Ong Kian Min; Mah Bow Tan; Yatiman Yusof; Sin Boon Ann; Irene Ng	Member of Parliament for Tampines GRC; 2006–present Served alongside: (2006-2011): Ong Kian Min, Mah Bow Tan, Sin Boon Ann, Irene Ng (2011-2015): Mah Bow Tan, Baey Yam Keng, Heng Swee Keat, Irene Ng (2015-2020): Cheng Li Hui, Baey Yam Keng, Heng Swee Keat, Desmond Choo (2020-2025): Cheng Li Hui, Baey Yam Keng, Koh Poh Koon, Desmond Choo (2025-present): David Neo, Charlene Chen, Baey Yam Keng, Koh Poh Koon	Incumbent
