= Baey Yam Keng =

Singaporean politician (born 1970)

The Honourable Baey Yam Keng
- 马炎庆
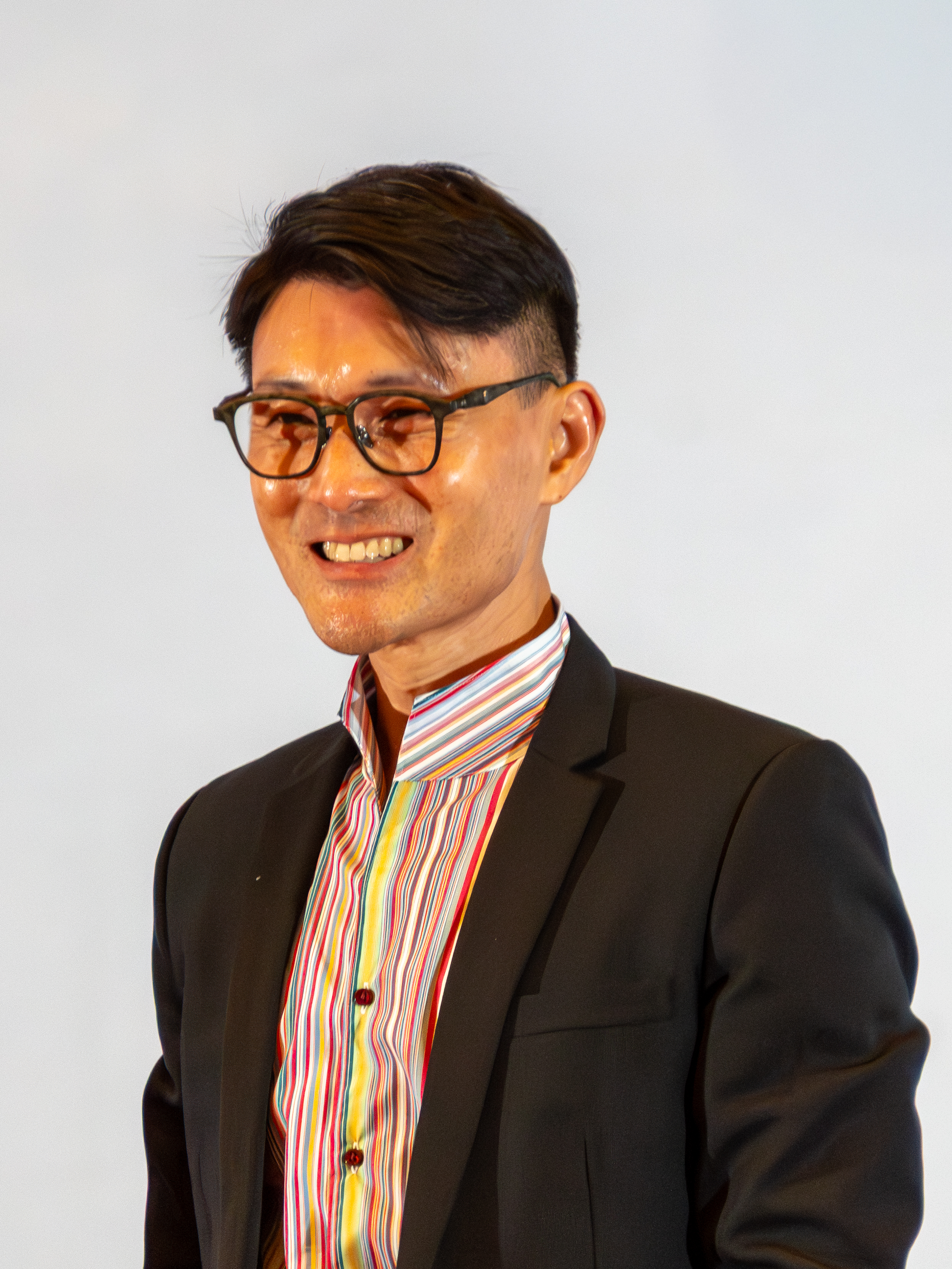
- Baey in 2025

Mayor of North East District
- Incumbent
- Assumed office 23 May 2025
- Prime Minister: Lawrence Wong
- Preceded by: Desmond Choo

Member of the Singapore Parliament for Tampines GRC
- Incumbent
- Assumed office 7 May 2011
- Preceded by: PAP held
- Majority: 2011: 18,347 (14.44%); 2015: 58,282 (44.12%); 2020: 46,793 (32.82%); 2025: 6,392 (4.65%)

Member of the Singapore Parliament for Tanjong Pagar GRC
- In office 27 April 2006 – 18 April 2011
- Preceded by: PAP held
- Succeeded by: PAP held
- Majority: N/A (walkover)

Personal details
- Born: 31 August 1970 (age 56) Singapore
- Party: People's Action Party
- Spouse: Lim Hai Yen (m. 1997)
- Children: 3
- Education: Imperial College London (BS); University College London (MS)
- Occupation: Politician

Baey Yam Keng (Note: Chinese: 马炎庆; Peng'im: Bhê^{2} Iam^{7} Kêng^{3}) (born 31 August 1970) is a Singaporean politician. A member of the governing People's Action Party (PAP), he has been the Member of Parliament (MP) for the Tampines Boulevard division of Tampines Group Representation Constituency (GRC) since 2025. He had previously represented the Queenstown division of Tanjong Pagar GRC from 2006 to 2011 and the Tampines North division of Tampines GRC from 2011 to 2025.

Before entering politics, Baey had worked in the public and corporate sectors in various organisations, including the Economic Development Board, Ministry of Trade and Industry, Ministry of Information, Communications and the Arts, National Arts Council, CapitaLand and Hill+Knowlton Strategies.

Since 23 May 2025, he has been the Minister of State in the Ministry of Culture, Community and Youth and the Ministry of Transport, as well as the Mayor for North East District.

Baey made his political debut in the 2006 general election when he joined the six-member PAP team for Tanjong Pagar GRC, which won in a walkover.

== Early life ==
Baey was born to Teochews and was the first batch of students at the now defunct Westlake Primary School from 1977 to 1982. He was educated at Catholic High School and Hwa Chong Junior College before he received a scholarship from the Economic Development Board to study biotechnology at Imperial College London. He graduated with a Bachelor of Science (first class honours) in biotechnology, and received a postgraduate scholarship from the Economic Development Board to complete a Master of Science (distinction) in biochemical engineering at University College London.

== Career ==
Baey started his career in 1995 in the public sector and had worked at the Economic Development Board, Ministry of Trade and Industry, Ministry of Information, Communications and the Arts, and National Arts Council. In 2006, he joined the corporate sector as Vice-President (Corporate Marketing & Corporate Social Responsibility) at CapitaLand and General Manager of CapitaLand Hope Foundation. In 2009, he joined Hill+Knowlton Strategies and was its Singapore Managing Director from 2011 to 2012. In 2013, he received a Lien Fellowship from Nanyang Technological University and was an adjunct lecturer at the university from 2013 to 2015.

=== Political career ===
Baey entered politics during the 2006 general election when he joined a six-member PAP team contesting in Tanjong Pagar GRC. The PAP team won in a walkover; Baey became the MP for the Queenstown division. In February 2007, Baey was named as one of the members of a "new media capabilities group" formed to counter online opposition to the PAP.

During the 2011 general election, Baey was redeployed to join the five-member PAP team for Tampines GRC; they defeated the National Solidarity Party (NSP) with 57.22% of the vote. He became the MP for the Tampines North ward of Tampines GRC.

In December 2013, Baey, known for sharing his personal life on social media, attracted controversy when he mentioned that he paid below the full price for a meal at a food stall in Tampines. After the stall owner stated at a Meet-the-People Session (MPS) that he had given Baey an undisclosed discount out of "simple goodwill", Baey publicised that the stall would offer a special discount for up to 100 customers a day from 21 to 22 December 2013, and would donate all proceeds to the Tampines North welfare fund to help needy residents. Baey also shared how a PAP activist under him pledged dollar for dollar for the same fund.

In June 2014, Baey allegedly called for legal action against people who had vandalised the PAP's article on Wikipedia in an edit war. He later stated that he did not call on the PAP to consider legal action as Wikipedia page edits were not a priority for said action; he also filed for The Straits Times to undo its claim that he had done so.

In January 2015, Baey was co-opted into the PAP's Central Executive Committee (CEC). He left it in 2017.

During the 2015 general election, Baey stood for reelection as part of a five-member PAP team in Tampines GRC; they defeated the NSP again with 72.07% of the vote. On 1 October 2015, he was appointed Parliamentary Secretary at the Ministry of Culture, Community and Youth. On 1 May 2018, he was promoted to Senior Parliamentary Secretary and appointed to the Ministry of Transport while concurrently serving at the Ministry of Culture, Community and Youth.

In the 2020 general election, Baey stood for reelection; the five-member PAP team for Tampines GRC defeated the NSP for a third time with 66.41% of the vote. On 26 July 2020, he relinquished his appointment at the Ministry of Culture, Community and Youth but continued serving as Senior Parliamentary Secretary at the Ministry of Transport. Baey was appointed Senior Parliamentary Secretary at the Ministry of Sustainability and the Environment on 13 June 2022.

Baey was a co-chairperson of the 2024 Public Toilets Task Force, which was convened to study and recommend solutions to improve the cleanliness of public toilets.

In the 2025 general election, Baey stood for reelection in Tampines GRC in a four-way fight against the Workers' Party (WP), People's Power Party (PPP), and NSP. The PAP retained the constituency with a decreased 52.02% of the vote against the WP's 47.37%, PPP's 0.43%, and NSP's 0.18%. After the election, he was reassigned to the newly created Tampines Boulevard division. On 21 May 2025, Baey was appointed as Minister of State for the Ministry of Culture, Community and Youth and the Ministry of Transport and Mayor of the North East District.

Baey is currently the chairperson of Tampines Town Council.

== Personal life ==
Baey married Lim Hai Yen, a playwright and director in 1997. They have three children.

Baey is the founding president and producer of a theatre group, The ETCeteras. In 2014, he had a lead acting role in Like Me. I Like, a play written and directed by his wife. He was diagnosed with stage one nose cancer in 2021, made known on 7 January the following year. On 22 April, Baey was cleared of tumours and other cancer-related virus DNA. In August 2023, Baey had his benign polyps removed after colonoscopy.

== Notes ==
Political offices
Preceded by Alvin Tan	Minister of State for Culture, Community and Youth; 2025–present Served alongside: Dinesh Vasu Dash	Incumbent
Preceded by Murali Pillai	Minister of State for Transport; 2025–present	Incumbent
Parliament of Singapore
Preceded by Khaw Boon Wan; Chay Wai Chuen; Chong Weng Chiew; Indranee Rajah; Koo Tsai Kee; Lee Kuan Yew	Member of Parliament for Tanjong Pagar GRC; 2006–2011; Served alongside: Lui Tuck Yew, Sam Tan, Indranee Rajah, Koo Tsai Kee, Lee Kuan Yew	Succeeded by Chan Chun Sing; Lily Neo; Chia Shi-Lu; Indranee Rajah; Lee Kuan Yew
Preceded by Ong Kian Min; Mah Bow Tan; Masagos Zulkifli; Sin Boon Ann; Irene Ng	Member of Parliament for Tampines GRC; 2011–present Served alongside: (2011-2015): Mah Bow Tan, Masagos Zulkifli, Heng Swee Keat, Irene Ng (2015-2020): Cheng Li Hui, Masagos Zulkifli, Heng Swee Keat, Desmond Choo (2020-2025): Cheng Li Hui, Masagos Zulkifli, Koh Poh Koon, Desmond Choo (2025-present): David Neo, Charlene Chen, Masagos Zulkifli, Koh Poh Koon	Incumbent
Government offices
Preceded by Desmond Choo	Mayor of North East District; 2025–present	Incumbent
