= Sebastian Teo =

Singaporean politician and businessman

- 张培源
- Born: Sebastian Teo Kway Huang; 1947 (age 78–79); Singapore
- Education: Nanyang University, National University of Singapore, University of Southern Queensland
- Occupations: Executive director, politician
- Political party: National Solidarity Party

Sebastian Teo Kway Huang (Chinese: 张培源; pinyin: Zhāng Péiyuán; born 1947) is a Singaporean former politician and businessman. He was formerly the president of the National Solidarity Party (NSP).

== Education ==
Teo holds a Bachelor of Arts (Honours) degree from Nanyang University, a Master of Business Administration degree from the National University of Singapore and a master's degree in Strategic Marketing Management from the University of Southern Queensland.

== Career ==
Teo began his career as an executive officer in the Ministry of Defence (MINDEF). He left MINDEF in 1975 and subsequently served as the executive director of Knight Royal Management International, the academy director for Strategy Academic Research, and as general manager of companies in China and Taiwan. He also worked extensively as a management consultant and was a part-time lecturer for the University of South Australia and the Asia Pacific International University, in addition to teaching stints with the NUS Business School and the Singapore Chinese Chamber Institute of Business.

=== Political career ===
Teo first stepped into the political arena in the 2001 general election, in which the NSP's candidates stood under the banner of the Singapore Democratic Alliance (SDA). Teo was part of the five-member SDA team in the Tampines Group Representation Constituency together with Yip Yew Weng, Christopher Neo, Foo Kok Wah and Abdul Rahim bin Osman. The SDA team was defeated by the team from the governing People's Action Party (PAP) made up of Mah Bow Tan, Yatiman Yusof, Ong Kian Min, Sin Boon Ann and Irene Ng. The SDA team took 26.7% of the valid votes to the PAP's 73.3%.

In the 2006 general election, Teo was a member of the SDA team in the Jalan Besar Group Representation Constituency, together with Fong Chin Leong, Cheo Chai Chen, Vincent Yeo and Muhamad Ali bin Aman. They went up against the PAP team of Lee Boon Yang, Yaacob Ibrahim, Heng Chee How, Lily Neo and Denise Phua. The SDA team took 30.7% of the valid votes to the PAP's 69.3%.

Following the 2006 general election, the NSP withdrew from the SDA and Teo took over the leadership of the party from Steve Chia. At the 2011 general election, Teo stood as a member of the NSP team in the Chua Chu Kang Group Representation Constituency together with Tony Tan Lay Thiam, Hazel Poa, Nor Lella Mardiiiah Mohamed and Jeisilan Sivalingam against the PAP team of Gan Kim Yong, Alvin Yeo, Zaqy Mohamad, Alex Yam and Low Yen Ling. The NSP team took 38.8% of the valid votes to the PAP's 61.2%.

In the 2015 general election, Teo returned to the Tampines Group Representation Constituency which he had contested in 2001. His NSP team took 27.9% of the valid votes, losing to the PAP team led by Heng Swee Keat which won 72.1%. Teo stepped down as president of the NSP in 2017 and was replaced by Spencer Ng; Teo subsequently became Chief Advisor.

In the 2020 Singaporean general election, Teo ran in Sembawang GRC where his team took 32.71% of the valid votes against the PAP team which won 67.29% of the votes. He did not contest in the 2025 Singapore general election.

== Corruption conviction and bankruptcies ==
In September 1979, Teo was arrested by Singapore's Corrupt Practices Investigation Bureau. The anti-corruption bureau believed that over a nine-month period from March to December 1975, when Teo was working at the Ministry of Defence, he had taken money on 12 occasions from a vegetable supplier in exchange for information regarding the successful vegetable supply contractor and the price of vegetables contracted, with the total amount paid to Teo being S$60,200. Teo subsequently pleaded guilty to two charges of corruption in November 1979, with ten other charges taken into consideration. He was fined S$15,000 and ordered to pay a penalty S$10,500 for the court proceedings.

Receiving and adjudication orders under the Bankruptcy Act were twice issued against Teo in 1985 and 1986.

Details of Teo's past convictions and bankruptcy were published in an article on the TR Emeritus website on 22 August 2015. In a subsequent post on the NSP's Facebook page, Teo claimed that he was innocent of the corruption charges, but that fear and a lack of legal experience had led him to plead guilty. He stated that: "I deferred to the advice of my legal and financial advisors. In hindsight, I wish I had not done so."
