= Charlene Chen =

Singaporean politician

The Honourable Charlene Chen
- 陈以君
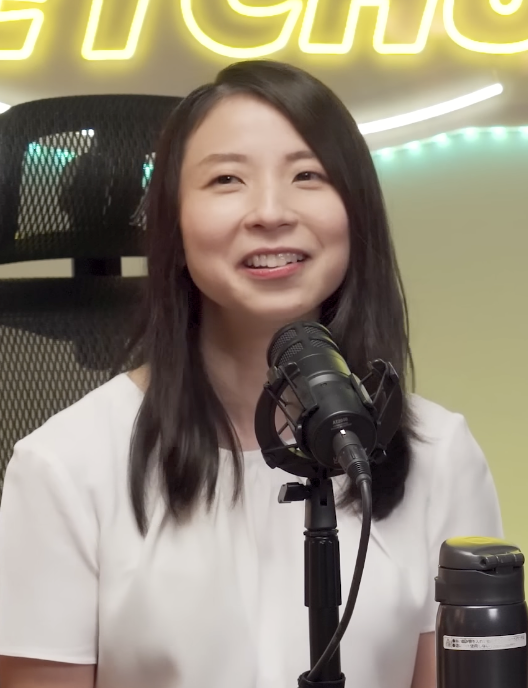
- Chen in 2025

Member of the Singapore Parliament for Tampines GRC
- Incumbent
- Assumed office 3 May 2025
- Preceded by: PAP held
- Majority: 6,392 (4.65%)

Personal details
- Born: Charlene Chen Yijun; 21 October 1982 (age 44) Singapore
- Party: People's Action Party
- Children: 2
- Education: Columbia University
- Occupation: Politician; assistant professor; social and consumer psychologist; former police psychologist

Charlene Chen Yijun (Note: Chinese: 陈以君; pinyin: Chén Yǐjūn) (born 21 October 1982) is a Singaporean politician, academic, social and consumer psychologist, who was elected to the Parliament of Singapore in the 2025 general election. A member of the People's Action Party (PAP), she represents the Tampines East division of Tampines Group Representation Constituency since 2025.

== Early life ==
Chen graduated from the National University of Singapore in 2005 with a first class honours degree in psychology. She then obtained a Master of Arts degree in clinical psychology from Columbia University in 2010, followed by a Master of Philosophy degree in marketing from the Columbia University in 2013. In 2015, Chen graduated from Columbia University with a Ph.D in marketing.

== Career ==
Since 2015, Chen has been an Assistant Professor with the Marketing Division of Nanyang Business School at Nanyang Technological University. She also serves as deputy director of industry relations and consulting at the Nanyang Centre for Marketing and Technology.

She was formerly a police psychologist at the Singapore Police Force from January 2006 to May 2008.

=== Political career ===
On 1 May 2024, Chen was appointed a member of the Tampines Town Council for a two-year term.

In June 2024, Chen was introduced as a new grassroots leader for the Tampines East ward of Tampines GRC by anchor minister Masagos Zulkifli, after former MP-in-charge Cheng Li Hui resigned in 2023 due to an extramarital affair with former Speaker of Parliament Tan Chuan-Jin.

During the 2025 general election, Chen was part of the five-member PAP team contesting in Tampines GRC, where the team won 52.02% of the vote in the constituency. Chen served as a Vice-chairman of the Tampines Town Council since 2025.

== Personal life ==
Chen is married with two children.

== Notes ==
Preceded by Baey Yam Keng; Cheng Li Hui; Masagos Zulkifli; Koh Poh Koon; Desmond Choo	Member of Parliament for Tampines GRC; 2025–present Served alongside: (2025-present): Baey Yam Keng, David Neo, Masagos Zulkifli, Koh Poh Koon	Incumbent
