= Desmond Choo =

Singaporean politician (born 1978)

The Honourable Desmond Choo
- 朱倍庆
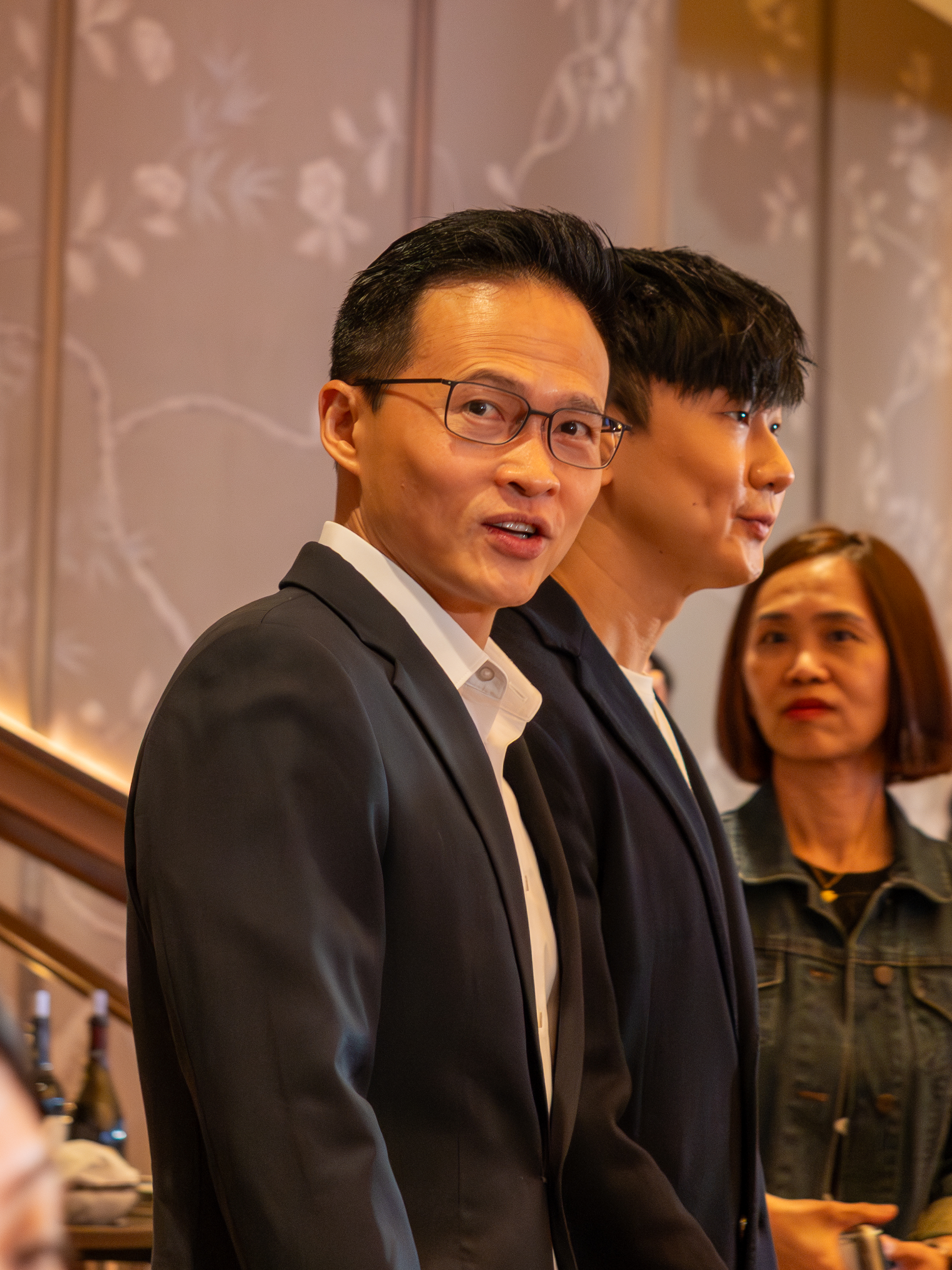
- Choo in 2025

Mayor of North East District
- In office 27 May 2017 – 23 May 2025
- Prime Minister: Lee Hsien Loong; Lawrence Wong
- Preceded by: Teo Ser Luck
- Succeeded by: Baey Yam Keng

Member of the Singapore Parliament for Tampines Changkat SMC
- Incumbent
- Assumed office 3 May 2025
- Preceded by: Constituency established
- Majority: 2,735 (12.32%)

Member of the Singapore Parliament for Tampines GRC
- In office 11 September 2015 – 15 April 2025
- Preceded by: PAP held
- Succeeded by: PAP held
- Majority: 2015: 58,282 (44.12%); 2020: 46,742 (32.82%)

Personal details
- Born: Desmond Choo Pey Ching; 13 February 1978 (age 48) Singapore
- Party: People's Action Party
- Spouse: Pamela Lee (m. 2011)
- Children: 2
- Relatives: Choo Wee Khiang (paternal uncle)
- Education: University of Chicago
- Occupation: Politician

Desmond Choo Pey Ching (Note: Chinese: 朱倍庆; pinyin: Zhū Bèiqìng) (born 13 February 1978) is a Singaporean politician and former police officer who has been serving as Deputy Secretary-General of the National Trades Union Congress (NTUC) since 2024 (previously Assistant Secretary General from 2015-2024) and Minister of State for Defence since 2025. He was formerly the Mayor of North East District from 2017 to 2025. A member of the governing People's Action Party (PAP), he has been the Member of Parliament (MP) for Tampines Changkat Single Member Constituency (SMC) since 2025. He had previously represented the defunct Tampines Changkat division of Tampines Group Representation Constituency (GRC) between 2015 and 2025.

== Early life ==
Choo attended Ai Tong School, Catholic High School and National Junior College, before graduating from the University of Chicago, majoring in economics under the Singapore Police Force Overseas Merit Scholarship.

== Career ==
=== Career outside politics ===
Choo was awarded a government university scholarship and upon graduation, he served his scholarship bond in the Singapore Police Force, where he served 12 years in senior officer ranks including commanding officer of the Woodlands Neighbourhood Police Centre, head of the Special Investigation Section and deputy commander of the Clementi Police Division. He also served a stint on secondment to the Ministry of Manpower, where he was the deputy director of the Foreign Workforce Policy Department and was also a bodyguard assistant for the swearing-in of Prime Minister Lee Hsien Loong and other new cabinet ministers at the Istana on 12 August 2004.

Choo resigned from the Singapore Police Force with the rank of Deputy Assistant Commissioner of Police to join the NTUC in 2010. After serving on probation as the deputy director of the NTUC's Youth Development Unit, he later became deputy director of the Industrial Relations Unit. He also concurrently served as the executive secretary of the Union of Security Employees and the Singapore Shell Employees Union.

After a stint in 2013 in the private sector with Kestrel Capital Pte Ltd, an investment firm, Choo returned to the public sector to rejoin NTUC in April 2014 and became the assistant secretary-general of National Trades Union Congress (NTUC). He also became the Director of Policy Division at NTUC.

On 26 May 2025, Choo resigned from the board of SBS Transit, a position he had held since April 2021, following his appointment as Minister of State for Defence on 23 May 2025.

=== Politics ===
Choo was the mayor of the North East District of Singapore from 2017 to 2025.

Choo stood as a candidate for the PAP at the 2011 general election in Hougang SMC, where he was defeated by Yaw Shin Leong from the incumbent Workers' Party (WP) with 35.2% of the valid votes. After Yaw was expelled from the WP and lost his seat in Parliament in 2012, Choo was nominated again by the PAP for the by-election in the SMC that same year. He was defeated in the by-election by the WP with 37.92% of the valid votes.

Choo went to contest in Tampines GRC led by Education Minister Heng Swee Keat and Minister Masagos Zulkifli in the 2015 general election, where the PAP team won with 72.07% of the vote. He was then assigned to the Tampines Changkat division. He was re-elected in the 2020 general election with 66% of the vote.

He was also appointed as chairperson of the Manpower Government Parliamentary Committee (GPC) in the 14th Parliament of Singapore.

Choo, as an MP also working for NTUC, is a labour MP as defined by the Singaporean media. In October 2024, ChannelNewsAsia noted that none of the labour MPs filed any questions or spoke during the parliamentary debate concerning the controversial deal to sell a controlling 51% stake in NTUC Enterprise subsidiary Income Insurance to Allianz.

Before the 2025 general election, Tampines Changkat SMC, where Choo stood for reelection, was carved from his Tampines Changkat division. He defeated Kenneth Foo from the WP with 56.16% of the vote.

== Personal life ==
Choo is married to Pamela Lee and has two daughters.

Choo's uncle, Choo Wee Khiang, was a PAP MP from 1988 to 1999 when he resigned from his position in Parliament and was found guilty in the same year of cheating. Choo had described his uncle as a source of inspiration and counsel.

== Notes ==
Parliament of Singapore
Preceded by Baey Yam Keng; Mah Bow Tan; Masagos Zulkifli; Heng Swee Keat; Irene Ng	Member of Parliament for Tampines GRC; 2015–2025; Served alongside: (2015-2020): Cheng Li Hui, Masagos Zulkifli, Heng Swee Keat, Baey Yam Keng (2020-2025): Cheng Li Hui, Masagos Zulkifli, Koh Poh Koon, Baey Yam Keng	Succeeded by David Neo; Charlene Chen; Masagos Zulkifli; Koh Poh Koon; Baey Yam Keng
New constituency	Member of Parliament for Tampines Changkat SMC; 2025-present	Incumbent
