= Meet-the-People Sessions =

One-on-one consultation where politicians meet with their constituents

Meet-the-People Sessions (MPS) are a series of one-to-one meetings between elected Members of Parliament (MPs) and their constituents in Singapore. The sessions are usually held once a week at a local constituency office staffed by partisan volunteers. Constituents visit their representative in the hope of resolving their various problems encountered in daily living. The MP will then write letters to the relevant ministry, statutory board or any concerned parties to appeal on behalf of the constituent. These letters are usually accorded a higher priority by the Civil Service as they come from elected Members of Parliament, regardless even from elected opposition MPs as the Singapore Civil Service is ought to accord MPs equally and democratic as based and sworn by the Singapore National Pledge.

Cases deal with a wide range of issues. The list is not exhaustive such as family financial problems (e.g. health-cost issues, jobs seeking, financial assistance), CPF matters, various licenses, HDB-related problems (e.g. subsidised rental housing, obtaining a subsidised HDB flat), immigration issues, and appeals for school admissions and school fee subsidy, neighbor and any other relational disputes.

== History ==
The establishment of these sessions can be traced back to Chief Minister David Marshall of the Labour Front in the 1950s, whereas topics such as immigration, housing and unemployment are the most trending at the time.

== Rationale ==
The rationale for the Meet-the-People Sessions (MPS) is so that Members of Parliament (MPs) can get a feel of the ground, regardless if the MP is also a member of the cabinet or as an opposition MP, it is under constitution where MPs are required to attend to their weekly MPS, although sometimes they may seek help from other MPs to cover duties when they have ministerial duties to attend to or are absent due to other matters such as medical leave.

The 1966 Wee Chong Jin Constitutional Commission had recommended an ombudsman to deal with complaints against the bureaucracy however, Parliament rejected the recommendation and instead preferred that such cases were to be handled by the Members of Parliament themselves or the national Feedback Unit. The need to perform an ombudsman function is probably another rationale for having the Meet-the-People Sessions.

== Process ==
The process of meeting the Members of Parliament varies from constituency to constituency, but follow a general pattern:

1. Registration and take queue number.
2. Constituent meets the writer who pens the appeal letter (either hand-written or via computer) on behalf of the MP.
3. Wait for a queue to consult the MP in person.
4. Meet and consult the MP, constituent narrates to the MP of his/her concerns.
5. MP will assure the constituent that they will provide assistance to their cases via the letters. For urgent cases, the letter will be typed out, proof-read and sign by the MP and hands it to the constituent on the spot. For typical cases, the letter will be vetted through by the MP and sent out usually after three working days.

Almost all Meet-the-People Sessions start after 7pm and can routinely last past midnight based on queue, and are staffed by partisan volunteers. The MPS operates on weekdays with some exceptions, where no MPS are held on public holidays. Some divisions may have two venues with one being held on alternating weekdays, on a fifth week that fall after the 28th of the month, or in rare cases, a division with one MP representing on that division and another MP on that alternate week. In the case of Group representation constituency (GRC), residents may meet any MPs of the corresponding constituency they reside if they so choose; constituents are generally not recommended to visit other constituencies (for example, visiting a particular area to meet the corresponding minister to question their ministry), because priority is typically allocated to serve the residents in the constituency.

If the MP could not personally attend as scheduled (such as MP being in overseas or are in medical leave), grassroots advisers or another MP of the relevant division or constituency may take over. MPs who have vacated their seats (such as resignation or death of MP) inside a GRC may be filled by other MPs from the same constituency on an interim basis without any replacement; if it is a single member constituency (SMC), another MP from that relevant GRC may substitute that seat until a new MP is elected after a by-election.

Options for a virtual teleconferencing of MPS were added since 2020 and has since rolled out to most of the constituencies, adding another option in engaging constituents; this was first piloted in December 2019, and has since become a feature in 2020 following the temporary suspension of physical MPS as a result of the COVID-19 pandemic in Singapore.

Under the constitution, and as such, following a format similar to Westminster System parliaments, once the parliament was dissolved, all MPs for the area ceases their duties and MPS sessions will be temporary suspended until the election of a new MP for that constituency, though residents can still reach out to their respective branch or team via email or designated contact channels provided by their former MPs for any urgent matters or ongoing appeals, which is handled by their grassroots volunteers for the division in question.

== Incidents ==
In May 2006, Seng Han Thong was attacked by a constituent of his, a 74-year-old disgruntled former taxi driver who felt that Seng was not taking any action to help him regain his lost taxi licence. The man later made a public apology to Seng, and the charges were dropped.

In January 2009, Seng suffered another attack by one of his constituents; a 70-year-old man set him on fire by pouring paint thinner on his back and then igniting him with a cigarette lighter. The man was believed to be mentally ill. Seng suffered burns to roughly 15 percent of his body, and received treatment at Singapore General Hospital. He took time off to recover from his injuries, and resumed his duties in July 2009.

On 12 March 2025, K. Shanmugam was confronted by two women at his Meet-The-People session to address Protection from Online Falsehoods and Manipulation Act (Pofma). The People's Action Party said that they were members of the Monday of Palestine Solidarity group. The PAP also confirmed that the same group had also visited across 10 other locations with the same agenda. Shanmugam however, took no further action against the group and no police reports were made.

== In popular culture ==
In 2017, Mediacorp released a comedy satire drama series, Meet The MP, starring Aaron Aziz as Danial Razali, the MP-elect in a fictional Tanjong Bukit Manis SMC. The series ran for two seasons and ended its run in 2019.

== See also ==
- Surgery (politics)
