= Irene Ng (politician) =

Singaporean politician

- 伍碧虹
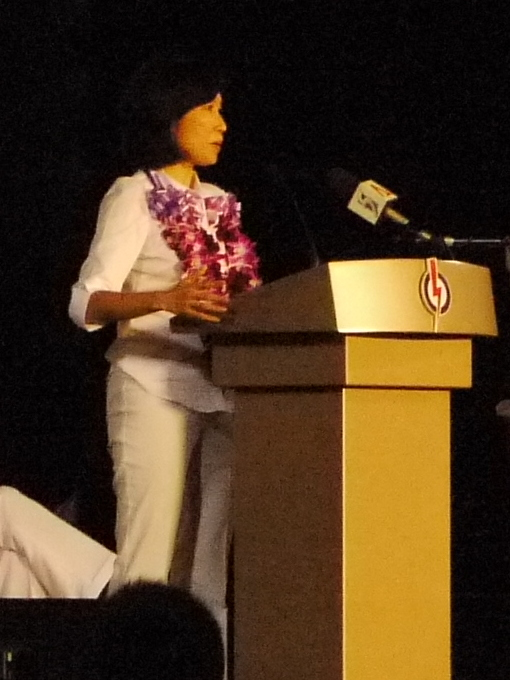
- Ng speaking at a rally during the 2011 general election

Member of Parliament for Tampines GRC
- In office 25 October 2001 – 25 August 2015
- Preceded by: PAP held
- Succeeded by: PAP held
- Majority: 2001: 54,684 (46.68%); 2006: 43,428 (37.02)

Personal details
- Born: Irene Ng Phek Hoong; 24 December 1963 (age 62) Penang, Malaysia
- Party: People's Action Party
- Spouse: Graham Berry (m. 2007)

Irene Ng Phek Hoong (Note: Chinese: 伍碧虹; Pe̍h-ōe-jī: Ngó͘ Phek-hông; pinyin: Wǔ Bìhóng) (born 24 December 1963) is a Malaysian-born Singaporean former politician who represented Tampines Group Representation Constituency (GRC) from 2001 to 2015. Before politics, she was a journalist for The Straits Times. During and after her time in office, Ng wrote a two-volume biography of S. Rajaratnam, Singapore's first Foreign Minister. Ng is also a Writer-in-Residence at the Institute of Southeast Asian Studies (ISEAS).

== Education and early career ==
From 1969–1979, Ng studied at Primary Convent Primary and Convent Secondary in Bukit Mertajam, Penang. She attended Nanyang Junior College, Singapore for two years and then did her Bachelor of Arts & Social Science at the National University of Singapore, obtaining her degree in 1986 studying sociology, English language and philosophy. She obtained her M.Sc in International Relations at the London School of Economics & Political Science in 1998.

In 1986, Ng was the editor of Kyoto Publication and later joined the Straits Times Press as a journalist. Ng was active as a journalist in Singapore by the late 1980s, with published reporting in The New Paper as early as 1988.

Before joining politics in 2001, Ng was the Senior Political Correspondent of The Straits Times. Irene has won several journalism and writing awards. After joining politics, she worked as director of programmes and senior research fellow at the Singapore Institute of International Affairs, and later, as a director at National Trades Union Congress.

== Political career ==
In the 2001 and 2006 general elections, Ng's party, the People's Action Party, were up against the Singapore Democratic Alliance over Tampines GRC. On both occasions, her team won with 73.34% and 68.51% of the votes respectively. At the 2011 general election, she was re-elected with 57.22% of the votes against the National Solidarity Party.

Irene was in the Government Parliamentary Committees (GPC) of Foreign Affairs and Defence, Education, as well as of Information and the Arts.

In 2006, Irene was awarded an honorary professorial fellowship at the Edinburgh University. She served as a faculty member of the Salzburg Global Seminar 2012. Later that year, she was a visiting senior fellow at East–West Center, Hawaii.

== Writing and gardening ==
Ng has written a two volume biography of S. Rajaratnam, Singapore's first Foreign Minister. The first volume, The Singapore Lion: A Biography of S. Rajaratnam, was published in early 2010. It won the Excellence Award for the ‘Best Book/Best Writer’ on Asian socio-economic or media scene’ at the Asian Publishing Awards 2010. The second volume, The Lion's Roar was published in 2024. In November 2025, it won the Dr Alan H.J. Chan Spirit Of Singapore Book Prize awarded by the Singapore University of Social Sciences. On 11 August 2011, Ng produced another book, The Short Stories and Radio Plays of S. Rajaratnam, which she edited with an introduction. It was launched by President SR Nathan.

Ng, often referred to as Irene Berry in British publications, developed a Japanese-style at her home in the Scottish Borders, transforming what had previously been a cobbled courtyard. In August 2020, the garden was featured on the BBC television programme Gardeners' World with Monty Don. In 2023, Berry's garden was shortlisted as one of eight finalists in BBC Gardeners' World Magazine's Gardens of the Year competition. Later that year, Berry was one of three finalists from the 2023 competition invited to join the judging panel for the 2024 Gardens of the Year competition.

== Personal life ==
Ng was married in her mid-twenties but got an annulment, and subsequently married Graham Berry, the chief executive of the Scottish Arts Council in 2007. As a full-time writer, she now divides her time between Singapore, Malaysia, where her parents still live, and Scotland, where she is based.

== Bibliography ==
Ng authored two books on S. Rajaratnam, The Singapore Lion in 2010 and The Lion’s Roar in 2024.

- Ng, Irene (2010), The Singapore Lion: A Biography of S. Rajaratnam, Institute of Southeast Asian Studies, ISBN 978-9-8142-7951-2
- Ng, Irene (2024), S. Rajaratnam, The Authorised Biography, Volume Two: The Lion's Roar, Iseas Publishing, ISBN 978-9-8151-0465-3
