= Tampines Group Representation Constituency =

Electoral division in Singapore

Tampines
- Group representation constituency for the Parliament of Singapore
- Region: East Region, Singapore
- Electorate: 148,119

Current constituency
- Created: 1988; 38 years ago
- Seats: 5
- Party: People's Action Party
- Members: Baey Yam Keng; Charlene Chen; David Neo; Masagos Zulkifli; Koh Poh Koon
- Town Council: Tampines
- Created from: Changkat Constituency; Tampines Constituency

The Tampines Group Representation Constituency (Note: Malay: Kawasan Undi Perwakilan Berkumpulan Tampines; Chinese: 淡滨尼集选区; Tamil: தெம்பனிஸ் குழுத்தொகுதி) is a five-member group representation constituency (GRC) in eastern Singapore. It has five divisions: Tampines Boulevard, Tampines Central, Tampines East, Tampines North and Tampines West, managed by Tampines Town Council. The current Members of Parliament (MPs) are Baey Yam Keng, Charlene Chen, Minister of Culture and Second Minister for Education David Neo, Minister for Social and Family Development Masagos Zulkifli and Koh Poh Koon from the People's Action Party (PAP).

== History ==
=== Prior to 2025 ===
From 1988 till 2020, the GRC was contested in every election in a two way fight by various opposition parties, except in the 1997 general election, when the PAP experienced a walkover. In both the 2015 and 2020 general elections, the PAP outperformed its national vote share in Tampines GRC with 72.06% to 69.9% and 66.41% to 61.2% respectively.

==== Resignation of Cheng Li Hui ====
On 17 July 2023, it was revealed by Prime Minister Lee Hsien Loong that one of the Tampines GRC's MPs, Cheng Li Hui, had been having an extramarital affair with fellow MP and Speaker of Parliament Tan Chuan-Jin since at least November 2020. This prompted their resignations from Parliament and the PAP on the same day. Masagos became the grassroots adviser for Tampines East division to cover the seat vacated by Cheng.

=== 2025 election ===
In the leadup to the 2025 general election, the incumbent PAP was expected to be challenged by the Workers' Party (WP), the National Solidarity Party (NSP) and the People's Power Party (PPP) in a four-way fight. On 11 March, the Electoral Boundaries Review Committee (EBRC) released their report on the boundaries changes for the 2025 general election. The Tampines Changkat division was carved out to form a standalone Single Member Constituency (SMC) while polling districts in Aljunied GRC east of Bedok Reservoir were absorbed into Tampines GRC. The changes were intended to keep the number of voters in Tampines GRC consistent while still electing five MPs. Tampines GRC also saw the first four-cornered contest in a constituency since 1997, when the PAP won 61.9% of the vote in Chua Chu Kang SMC against the NSP, an independent candidate and the Democratic Progressive Party (DPP), as well as its first WP contest.

The PAP ended up retaining the GRC with 52% of the vote, a negative swing of over 14%, being its narrowest GRC victory in the election. The WP received more than 47% of the vote, while the NSP and PPP collectively received less than 1%. It was the PAP's toughest contest in the constituency since its creation in 1988. By virtue of having the second highest defeated vote percentage for the opposition, after Jalan Kayu SMC, which was contested by the WP's Andre Low, the second of two Non-constituency Member of Parliament (NCMP) seats was offered to a member of the WP slate that contested in Tampines GRC; the first had been offered to Low. On 19 May, the Elections Department announced that the WP had nominated Eileen Chong, along with Low, as the NCMPs for the 15th Parliament.

== Constituency profile ==
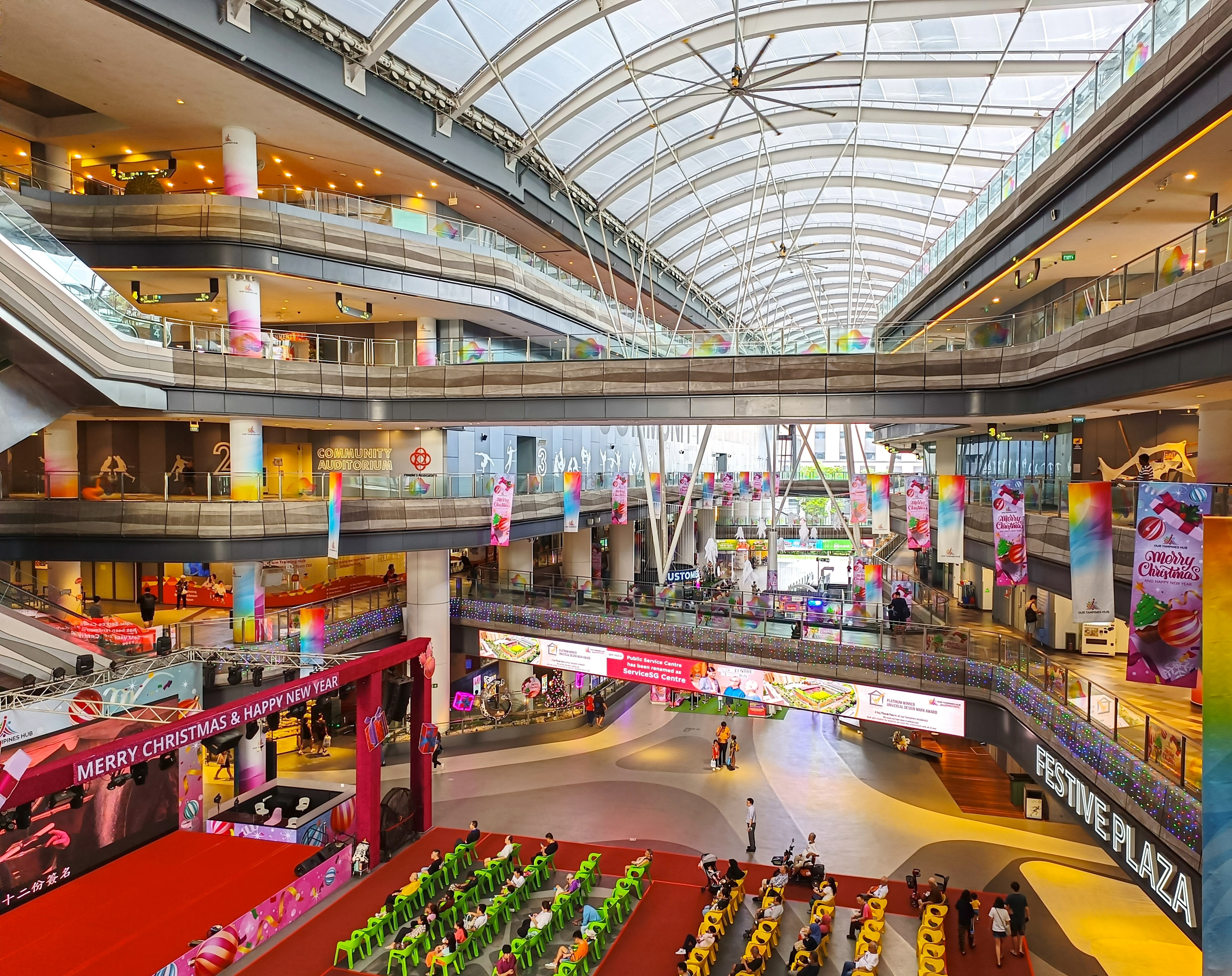
Our Tampines Hub is located within Tampines GRC

Tampines GRC encompasses a significant part of the Tampines planning area, but with differences including excluding areas such as Simei and Tanah Merah. It is a densely populated and mature residential town with a developed town centre and integrated transport infrastructure. MRT stations include Tampines West, Tampines (and its bus interchange) and Tampines East, with Tampines North still under construction. The GRC also includes significant commercial and retail developments such as Tampines Mall, Century Square and Our Tampines Hub.

As of the 2025 general election, the GRC geographically borders Pasir Ris–Changi GRC to the north, Aljunied GRC to the west and Tampines Changkat SMC to the south. Tampines is predominantly characterised by high-density public housing developments and a middle-income population.

== Members of Parliament ==
Divisions or wards of Tampines GRC as of the 2025 general election:
1 Tampines Boulevard
2 Tampines Central
3 Tampines East
4 Tampines North
5 Tampines West

Year	Division	Members of Parliament	Party
Formation
1988	Tampines East; Tampines West; Tampines Changkat	Mah Bow Tan; Yatiman Yusof; Aline Wong	PAP
1991	Tampines East; Tampines West; Tampines Changkat; Changkat South	Mah Bow Tan; Yatiman Yusof; Aline Wong; Chng Hee Kok	PAP
1997	Tampines East; Tampines West; Tampines Central; Tampines Changkat	Mah Bow Tan; Yatiman Yusof; Sin Boon Ann; Aline Wong	PAP
2001	Tampines North; Tampines East; Tampines West; Tampines Central; Tampines Changkat	Ong Kian Min; Mah Bow Tan; Yatiman Yusof; Sin Boon Ann; Irene Ng	PAP
2006	Tampines North; Tampines East; Tampines West; Tampines Central; Tampines Changkat	Ong Kian Min; Mah Bow Tan; Masagos Zulkifli; Sin Boon Ann; Irene Ng	PAP
2011	Tampines North; Tampines East; Tampines West; Tampines Central; Tampines Changkat	Baey Yam Keng; Mah Bow Tan; Masagos Zulkifli; Heng Swee Keat; Irene Ng	PAP
2015	Tampines North; Tampines East; Tampines West; Tampines Central; Tampines Changkat	Baey Yam Keng; Cheng Li Hui; Masagos Zulkifli; Heng Swee Keat; Desmond Choo	PAP
2020	Tampines North; Tampines East; Tampines West; Tampines Central; Tampines Changkat	Baey Yam Keng; Cheng Li Hui (2020–2023); Masagos Zulkifli; Koh Poh Koon; Desmond Choo	PAP
2025	Tampines North; Tampines East; Tampines West; Tampines Central; Tampines Boulevard	David Neo; Charlene Chen; Masagos Zulkifli; Koh Poh Koon; Baey Yam Keng	PAP

== Electoral results ==
Note: The Elections Department does not include rejected votes when calculating the vote shares of candidates. Hence, all candidates' vote shares will total to 100% at any given election (may not appear so in multi-way contests due to rounding).

=== Elections in 1980s ===
General Election 1988
Party	Candidate	Votes	%
PAP	Mah Bow Tan Yatiman bin Yusof Aline Wong	37,216	61.00%
NSP	Lim Ah Yong Chan Yeng Cheong Abdul Malik bin Ali	23,796	39.00%
Majority		13,420	22.00
Total valid votes		61,012	97.13
Rejected ballots		1,804	2.87
Turnout		62,816	96.42
Registered electors		65,148	
PAP win (new seat)			

=== Elections in 1990s ===
General Election 1991
Party	Candidate	Votes	%	±%
PAP	Mah Bow Tan Yatiman Yusof Aline Wong Chng Hee Kok	38,844	59.48	▼1.52
NSP	Ken Sunn Rasiah Thiagarajah Ong Seng Kwe Sarry bin Hassan	26,457	40.52	▲1.52
Majority		12,387	18.96	▼3.04
Total valid votes		65,301	97.00	▼0.13
Rejected ballots		2,017	3.00	▲0.13
Turnout		67,318	96.44	▲0.02
Registered electors		69,801		▲7.14
PAP hold		Swing	▼1.52	

General Election 1997
Party	Candidate	Votes	%	±%
PAP	Mah Bow Tan; Yatiman Yusof; Sin Boon Ann; Aline Wong	Unopposed		
Registered electors		94,476		▲35.35
PAP hold				

=== Elections in 2000s ===
General Election 2001
Party	Candidate	Votes	%	±%
PAP	Ong Kian Min Mah Bow Tan Yatiman Yusof Sin Boon Ann Irene Ng	85,915	73.34	N/A
SDA	Sebastian Teo Foo Kok Wah Neo Ting Wei Abdul Rahim Yip Yew Weng	31,231	26.66	N/A
Majority		54,684	46.68	
Total valid votes				
Rejected ballots				
Turnout		119,479	95.3	N/A
Registered electors				
PAP hold		Swing	N/A	

General Election 2006
Party	Candidate	Votes	%	±%
PAP	Ong Kian Min Mah Bow Tan Masagos Zulkifli Sin Boon Ann Irene Ng	80,376	68.51	▼4.83
SDA	Abdul Rahman Mohamad Lim Tung Hee Arthero Ng Say Eng Ong Hock Siong Tan Lead Shake	36,948	31.49	▲4.83
Majority		43,428	37.02	
Total valid votes		117,324		
Rejected ballots				
Turnout		120,416	95.4	▲0.1
Registered electors				
PAP hold		Swing	▼4.83	

=== Elections in 2010s ===
General Election 2011
Party	Candidate	Votes	%	±%
PAP	Baey Yam Keng Mah Bow Tan Masagos Zulkifli Heng Swee Keat Irene Ng	72,728	57.22	▼11.29
NSP	Goh Meng Seng Raymond Lim Gilbert Goh Syafarin Sarif Reno Fong	54,381	42.78	▲11.29
Majority		18,347	14.44	
Total valid votes		127,109		
Rejected ballots				
Turnout		130,184	94.7	▼0.7
Registered electors				
PAP hold		Swing	▼11.29	

General Election 2015
Party	Candidate	Votes	%	±%
PAP	Baey Yam Keng Cheng Li Hui Masagos Zulkifli Heng Swee Keat Desmond Choo	95,202	72.06	▲14.84
NSP	Lim Tean Sebastian Teo Reno Fong Nor Lella Mardilla Muhd Choong Hon Heng	36,920	27.94	▼14.84
Majority		58,282	44.12	▲29.68
Total valid votes		132,122	97.32	
Rejected ballots		3,638	2.68	▲0.32
Turnout		135,760	94.59	▼0.1
Registered electors				
PAP hold		Swing	▲14.84	

=== Elections in 2020s ===
General Election 2020
Party	Candidate	Votes	%	±%
PAP	Masagos Zulkifli Baey Yam Keng Cheng Li Hui Koh Poh Koon Desmond Choo	94,668	66.41	▼5.65
NSP	Reno Fong Mohammad Rizwan Mohammad Yeo Ren-Yuan Choong Hon Heng Vincent Ng	47,875	33.59	▲5.65
Majority		46,793	32.82	▼11.3
Total valid votes		142,543	97.57	▲0.25
Rejected ballots		3,521	2.43	▼0.25
Turnout		146,064	96.36	▲1.66
Registered electors		151,589		
PAP hold		Swing	▼5.65	

General Election 2025
Party	Candidate	Votes	%	±%
PAP	Baey Yam Keng Charlene Chen David Neo Masagos Zulkifli Koh Poh Koon	71,589	52.02	▼14.39
WP	Eileen Chong Faisal Manap Jimmy Tan Michael Thng Ong Lue Ping	65,197	47.37	N/A
PPP	Goh Meng Seng Arbaah Haroun Derrick Sim Peter Soh Vere Nathan	596	0.43	N/A
NSP	Eugene Yeo Mohamad Ridzwan Zee Phay Reno Fong Thamilselvan Karuppaya	249	0.18	▼33.41
Majority		6,392	4.65	▼28.17
Total valid votes		137,631	99.09	▲1.52
Rejected ballots		1,262	0.91	▼1.52
Turnout		138,893	93.77	▼2.59
Registered electors		148,119		▼2.29
PAP hold		Swing	▼14.39	
