= Tampines Changkat Single Member Constituency =

Electoral division in Singapore

Tampines Changkat
- Single-member constituency for the Parliament of Singapore
- Region: East Region, Singapore
- Electorate: 23,847

Current constituency
- Created: 11 March 2025; 12 months ago
- Seats: 1
- Party: People's Action Party
- Member: Desmond Choo
- Town Council: Tampines
- Created from: Tampines GRC; East Coast GRC

Tampines Changkat Single Member Constituency (Note: Malay: Kawasan Undi Perseorangan Tampines Changkat; Chinese: 淡滨尼尚育单选区; Tamil: தெம்பனிஸ் சங்காட் தனித்தொகுதி) is a single-member constituency (SMC) situated in eastern Singapore. It is managed by Tampines Town Council (TTC). The current Member of Parliament (MP) for the constituency is Desmond Choo from the People's Action Party (PAP).

== History ==
Tampines Changkat SMC was established for the 2025 general election from most of the Tampines Changkat division in Tampines Group Representation Constituency (GRC) and the 42nd polling district of East Coast GRC, reducing the number of voters in Tampines GRC.

In the same election, Choo, the incumbent MP for the Tampines Changkat division, contested the SMC against Kenneth Foo from the Workers' Party (WP). Choo won 56.16% of the vote.

=== ICA investigation ===
Before the 2025 general election, an investigation by the Immigration and Checkpoints Authority (ICA) was launched in relation to the SMC after it was revealed that only one voter was registered in the EC42 polling district and was supposedly living in Tampines Industrial Park A. At the same time, of the four Build-to-Order (BTO) projects in the polling district, only one had been finished, with the residents receiving their keys after the finalisation of the Registers of Electors; thus, they could not vote in the SMC. The voter also said that he did not live at his registered address, a crime punishable by a fine of up to $5000 and a jail sentence of up to 5 years. However, he received a verbal advisory instead for failure to update his address, having moved out of the industrial park in 2022.

== Member of Parliament ==
Interactive map of Tampines Changkat SMC as of the 2025 general election

Year	Member	Party
Formation
2025	Desmond Choo	PAP

== Electoral results ==
Note: The Elections Department does not include rejected votes when calculating the vote shares of candidates. Hence, all candidates' vote shares will total to 100% at any given election (may not appear so in multi-way contests due to rounding).

=== Elections in 2020s ===
General Election 2025
Party	Candidate	Votes	%
PAP	Desmond Choo	12,476	56.16
WP	Kenneth Foo	9,741	43.84
Majority		2,735	12.32
Total valid votes		22,217	99.00
Rejected ballots		224	1.00
Turnout		22,441	94.10
Registered electors		23,847	
PAP win (new seat)			
