= Tan Chuan-Jin =

Singaporean politician

Tan Chuan-Jin PPA(P)
- 陈川仁
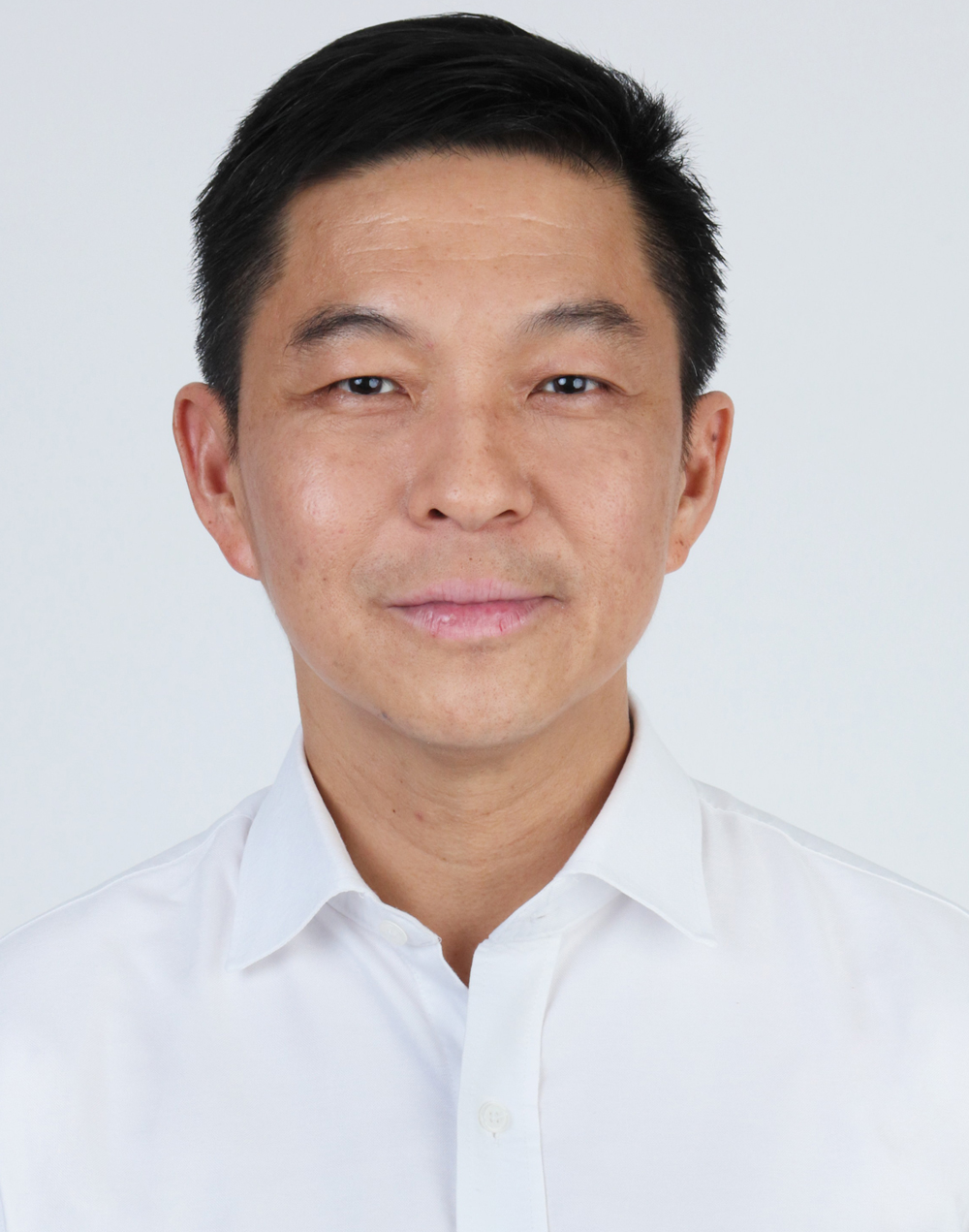
- Official portrait, 2021

8th Speaker of the Parliament of Singapore
- In office 11 September 2017 – 17 July 2023
- Deputy: Charles Chong; Lim Biow Chuan; Christopher de Souza; Jessica Tan
- Preceded by: Halimah Yacob
- Succeeded by: Jessica Tan (Acting); Seah Kian Peng

Minister for Social and Family Development
- In office 9 April 2015 – 10 September 2017
- Prime Minister: Lee Hsien Loong
- Preceded by: Chan Chun Sing
- Succeeded by: Desmond Lee

Minister for Manpower
- In office 1 May 2014 – 4 May 2015; Acting: 1 August 2012 – 30 April 2014
- Prime Minister: Lee Hsien Loong
- Preceded by: Tharman Shanmugaratnam
- Succeeded by: Lim Swee Say

Member of Parliament for Marine Parade GRC
- In office 7 May 2011 – 17 July 2023
- Preceded by: PAP held
- Succeeded by: PAP held
- Majority: 2011: 2015: 2020: 20,143 (15.52%)

Personal details
- Born: 10 January 1969 (age 57) Singapore
- Party: People's Action Party (2011–2023)
- Children: 2
- Education: London School of Economics (BSc); King's College London (MA); National University of Singapore (MPA)

Military service
- Branch/service: Singapore Army
- Years of service: 1987–2011
- Rank: Brigadier-General
- Commands: Commander, Army Training and Doctrine Command; Commander, 3rd Division; Assistant Chief of the General Staff (Plans); Commander, 7th Singapore Infantry Brigade; Army Attaché, Jakarta; Commanding Officer, 3 Guards Battalion

Tan Chuan-Jin (Note: Chinese: 陈川仁; pinyin: Chén Chuānrén) PPA(P) (born 10 January 1969) is a Singaporean former politician and brigadier-general. A former member of the governing People's Action Party (PAP), he served as Speaker of Parliament between 2017 and 2023, and a Member of Parliament (MP) for Marine Parade Group Representation Constituency (GRC) from 2011 to 2023.

He also served as Minister for Manpower between 2014 and 2015, and Minister for Social and Family Development between 2015 and 2017.

Prior to his appointment to the Cabinet, he served as a Senior Minister of State and Acting Minister between 2012 and 2014. Tan also served as President of the Singapore National Olympic Council between 2014 and 2023.

In July 2023, both Tan and Cheng Li Hui resigned from Parliament and the PAP after admitting to a years-long extramarital affair with each other. Tan resigned as an MP, the Speaker of Parliament and a member of the PAP on 17 July. His division was temporarily covered by Edwin Tong, fellow MP for Marine Parade GRC.

== Education ==
Tan attended Anglo-Chinese School and Raffles Junior College before graduating from the London School of Economics with a Bachelor of Science degree in economics under the Singapore Armed Forces Overseas Scholarship.

He also completed a Master of Arts degree in defence studies at King's College London, and a Master of Public Administration degree at the National University of Singapore's Lee Kuan Yew School of Public Policy in 2008.

== Career ==
=== Military career ===
Tan enlisted in the Singapore Armed Forces in 1987 and was commissioned as an officer in the Singapore Army before attaining the rank Brigadier-General. During his time in the military, he held various command and staff positions, including Commanding Officer of the 3 Guards Battalion, Army Attaché at the Singapore embassy in Jakarta, Commander of the 7th Singapore Infantry Brigade, Assistant Chief of the General Staff (Plans), Commander of the 3rd Division, and Commander of the Army Training and Doctrine Command. In the aftermath of the 2004 Indian Ocean earthquake and tsunami, Tan was the commander of the Singapore Armed Forces Humanitarian Assistance Task Force deployed to Meulaboh. He received the Public Administration Medal (Silver) (Military) for services rendered in the Tsunami Relief Operation in 2005. He was also the chairman of the executive committee of the 2009 Singapore National Day Parade.

On 25 March 2011, Tan retired from the Singapore Armed Forces to enter politics.

=== Political career ===
Tan was announced as a People's Action Party (PAP) candidate joining the five-member PAP team contesting in Marine Parade GRC during the 2011 general election. After the PAP team won with 56.65% of the vote against the National Solidarity Party, Tan became a Member of Parliament representing the Kembangan–Chai Chee ward of Marine Parade GRC.

On 1 August 2012, he was appointed Senior Minister of State at the Ministry of National Development and Acting Minister for Manpower. During his tenure at the Ministry of National Development, Tan worked with heritage, nature, environmental and animal welfare groups on issues related to the Rail Corridor and Bukit Brown Cemetery. He also worked on issues which led to Sisters' Islands being designated as Singapore's first marine park, as well as amendments being made to the Animal and Birds Act.

On 1 September 2013, Tan relinquished his appointment at the Ministry of National Development and became Senior Minister of State at the Ministry of Manpower while continuing to serve as Acting Minister for Manpower. On 1 May 2014, he was promoted to full Minister. On 9 April 2015, Tan became Minister for Social and Family Development as part of a Cabinet reshuffle and continued to helm the Ministry of Manpower until he relinquished it to Lim Swee Say on 4 May of the same year.

During the 2015 general election, Tan with his PAP teammates defended their seats in Marine Parade GRC which they won with 64.07% of the vote against the Workers' Party (WP). After the election, Tan continued serving as Minister for Social and Family Development.

Tan retained his parliamentary seat after his five-member PAP team contesting in Marine Parade GRC during the 2020 general election won again with 57.74% of the vote against the WP.

==== Speaker of Parliament (2017–2023) ====
On 11 September 2017, he resigned his Cabinet portfolio and became the 10th Speaker of Parliament after the post was vacated by Halimah Yacob when she resigned to contest in the 2017 Singaporean presidential election.

On 11 July 2023, Tan made a public apology to WP MP Jamus Lim after a clip of him using unparliamentary language during a 17 April parliamentary sitting was shared on Reddit. As Speaker of Parliament, Tan was heard saying "fucking populist" under his breath at the end of a 20-minute speech by Lim urging the PAP government to further help lower-income groups and to establish an official poverty line, when the microphone picked up Tan's comment. Tan apologised to Lim who accepted his apology.

==== Resignation ====
On 17 July 2023, both Tan and Cheng Li Hui simultaneously resigned from Parliament and as members of the PAP due to "propriety and personal conduct". Prime Minister and PAP's Secretary-General Lee Hsien Loong confirmed that Tan, who is married, and Cheng were having an extramarital affair, since at least 2020. Though Lee found out that the extramarital affair continued through to February 2023, and Tan had offered his resignation then, Lee asked for Tan to first sort out the succession arrangements in his ward.

In a statement, Lee responded to their resignation letters that their resignations were "necessary" for "maintain[ing] the high standards of propriety and personal conduct which the PAP has upheld all these years." Their respective parliamentary seats at Marine Parade GRC and Tampines GRC were subsequently left vacant, and the workload for Tan's Kembangan–Chai Chee division of Marine Parade GRC and Cheng's Tampines East division of Tampines GRC were distributed among the other MPs in their respective GRCs. Tan also resigned his position as Speaker of the Parliament.

=== Other career ===
In January 2014, Tan began serving as the president of the Singapore National Olympic Council. He resigned in 2023 following his announcement of his extramarital affair.

In 2024, Tan would be announced as an instructor for a "masterclass in leadership" held at the SMF Centre for Corporate Learning in a Facebook post, which was quickly taken down due to significant backlash; the course itself would proceed as scheduled. He has also been a consultant at the Tan Chin Tuan Foundation since October 2023.

== Personal life ==
Tan is married with two children. He is a practising Christian.

In 2023, it was revealed that Tan had an extramarital affair with fellow parliamentarian Cheng Li Hui since at least November 2020. Both resigned from Parliament as a result.

== Notes ==
Political offices
Preceded by Tharman Shanmugaratnam	Minister for Manpower; 2012 – 2015	Succeeded by Lim Swee Say
Preceded by Chan Chun Sing	Minister for Social and Family Development; 2015 – 2017	Succeeded by Desmond Lee
Parliament of Singapore
Preceded by Ong Seh Hong as MP (Kampong Ubi-Kembangan)	Member of Parliament for Marine Parade GRC (Kembangan-Chai Chee); 2011 – 2023	Succeeded by
Preceded by Halimah Yacob	Speaker of Parliament; 2017 – 2023	Succeeded by Seah Kian Peng
