= Cheng Li Hui =

Singaporean politician

Cheng Li Hui PBM
- 钟丽慧
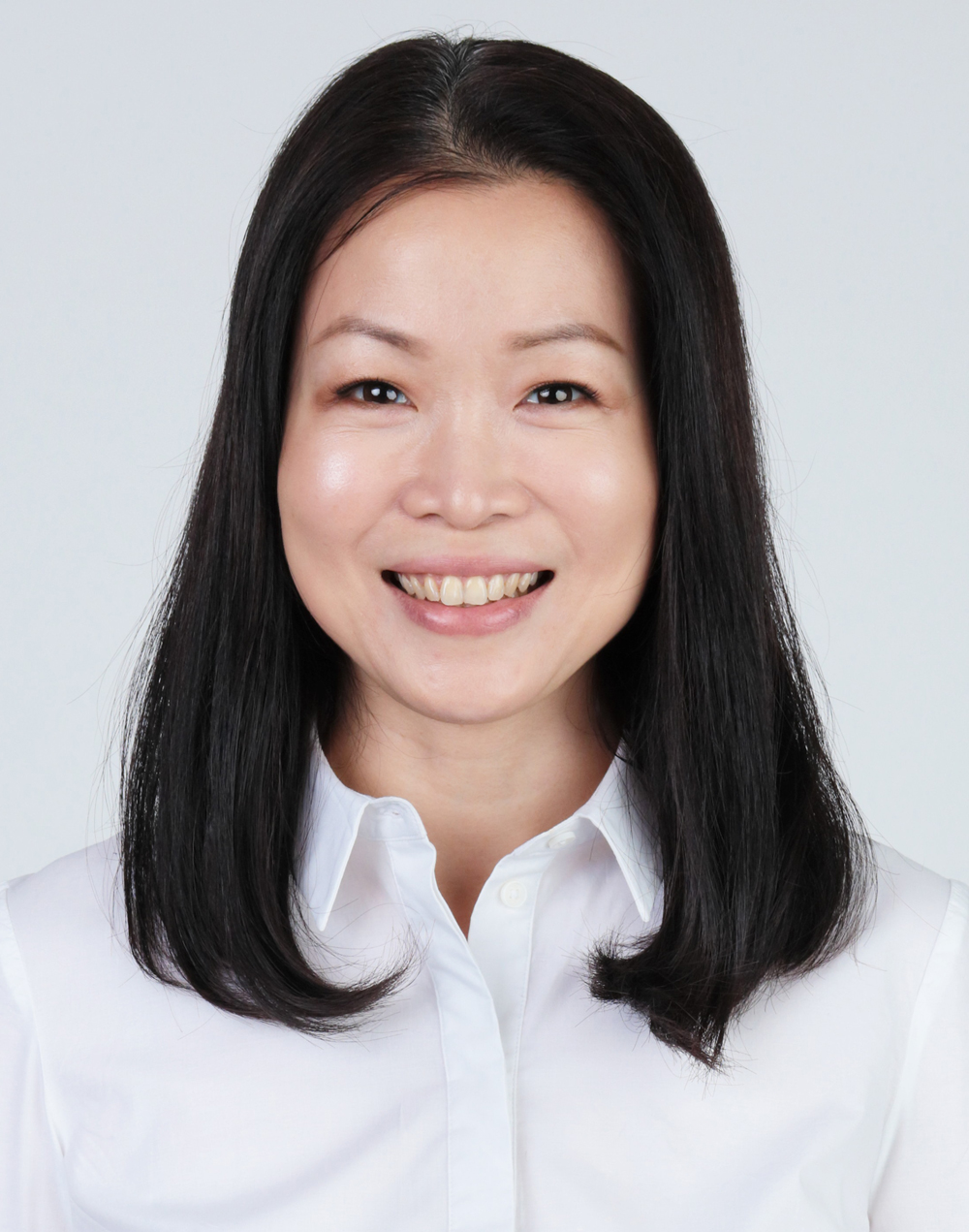
- Official portrait, 2021

Member of Parliament for Tampines GRC
- In office 11 September 2015 – 17 July 2023
- Preceded by: PAP held
- Succeeded by: PAP held
- Majority: 2015: 58,282 (44.12%); 2020: 46,793 (32.82%)

Personal details
- Born: 1976 (age 49–50) Singapore
- Party: People's Action Party (2015–2023)
- Education: National University of Singapore (BA); Macquarie University (MAppFin)
- Occupation: Businesswoman, politician

Cheng Li Hui PBM (Chinese: 钟丽慧; pinyin: Zhōng Lìhuì; born 1976) is a Singaporean businesswoman and former politician. A former member of the governing People's Action Party (PAP), she was the Member of Parliament (MP) representing the Tampines East division of Tampines Group Representation Constituency (GRC) between 2015 and 2023, when she resigned regarding an extramarital affair with then-Speaker of Parliament Tan Chuan-Jin.

== Education ==
Cheng studied at Bukit Panjang Government High School and Anglo-Chinese Junior College, and graduated from the National University of Singapore with a Bachelor of Arts degree. She subsequently went on to complete a Master of Applied Finance degree at Macquarie University.

== Career ==
=== Political career ===
Prior to entering politics, Cheng had 12 years of grassroots experience, volunteering for the Bukit Panjang branch of the PAP at its Meet-the-People Sessions (MPSs).

Cheng made her political debut at the 2015 general election as part of the PAP team for the five-member Tampines GRC; she became the MP for the Tampines East division of the GRC after the PAP defeated the National Solidarity Party (NSP) with 72.07% of the vote. She was appointed Deputy District Advisor of the PAP Women's Wing in 2016.

In the 2020 general election, Cheng stood for reelection in Tampines GRC; the PAP defeated the NSP with 66.41% of the vote.

On 17 July 2023, Cheng and Tan Chuan-Jin, the married then-Speaker of Parliament, resigned from both Parliament and the PAP. During a press conference, Lee Hsien Loong, then-Prime Minister and secretary-general of the PAP, confirmed that the two had resigned over an affair he first heard of after the 2020 general election. They had previously undergone counselling regarding the affair; however, they resigned after he "came across" information indicating that they had continued it. In statements, Lee said that Cheng and Tan's resignations were "necessary" to "maintain the high standards of propriety and personal conduct which the PAP [had] upheld all these years."

=== Business career ===
As of 2017, Cheng was serving as Deputy Chief Executive Officer of Hai Leck Holdings. She was also a board member at Allied Construction, Hai Leck Engineering, Enzo Investment, Hai Leck Development, Hai Leck Holdings and Cheng Capital Holdings.

== Personal life ==
Cheng is the daughter of Cheng Buck Poh, the founder and Executive Chairman of Hai Leck Holdings. She has three siblings.

Cheng is unmarried, according to news coverage of her affair with Tan.

Parliament of Singapore
Preceded by Mah Bow Tan	Member of Parliament for Tampines GRC (Tampines East); 2015 – 2023	Succeeded by Charlene Chen
