= Irene Ng =

Former American actor

- Born: Sze Irene Ng (黃敏); July 28, 1974 (age 52); Penang, Malaysia
- Occupations: Actress (Note: hiatus; stepped back from acting in the late 1990s, now only occasionally, 2000s-present), teacher and banker
- Spouse: David Rosa (2008–present)
- Children: 2

Chinese name
- Traditional Chinese: 黃敏
- Simplified Chinese: 黄敏
Transcriptions
Standard Mandarin
- Hanyu Pinyin: Huáng Mǐn
Yue: Cantonese
- Jyutping: Wong4 Man5
Southern Min
- Hokkien POJ: N̂g Bín

Sze Irene Ng (born July 28, 1974) is a Malaysian-American actress, teacher and banker. She played the role of Shelby Woo in The Mystery Files of Shelby Woo, which aired on Nickelodeon between 1996 and 1999.

== Early life and education ==
Ng was born July 28, 1974, in Penang, Malaysia. For the first five years of her life, she was raised by her maternal grandparents as her parents were at the United States for their higher studies.

In 1989 at age 15, she immigrated from Malaysia to Allentown, Pennsylvania, with her parents and her sister and brother. Her father worked as a general manager for a China-owned fire-resistant filing cabinets manufacturing factory and her mother worked as a nurse at an Allentown hospital. She attended Allentown's William Allen High School and in 1993, she and her sister graduated as valedictorians from high school. At age 16, she was discovered by television agents when she won a Pennsylvania beauty contest.

During her entertainment career in the 1990s, she began her studies at Harvard University and graduated with BA in economics in 1997, and was elected member of Phi Beta Kappa and was finalist for Rhodes Scholarship. She later received certification in childcare management at New York University and also Child Development Associate credential.

== Career ==
=== Actress ===
External videos
- Irene Ng speaking on Asian American & Pacific Islander Heritage Month (15 May 2022), Facebook (Nickelodeon)

Ng's first acting role was in ABC soap opera All My Children in 1991, where she starred in 18 episodes. In 1993, she starred in films The Joy Luck Club and Heaven & Earth. Ng has guest starred on Law & Order and Teen Angel. In 1996, she was cast as the main protagonist in the Nickelodeon TV series Mystery Files of Shelby Woo, reportedly making her at that time the second Asian American to star as title character in a TV series after Margaret Cho in the All-American Girl. The show ran for four seasons till 1999. In 1997, she took part in Nickelodeon game show Figure It Out. Her last film role was in the 1999 film The Sterling Chase. Following the start of the 21st century, Ng ended her entertainment career, and only had a minor role in an episode of season 19 of Law & Order in 2008 and an episode of the fourth season of Showtime series The Affair in 2018.

=== Post-acting career ===
Following her studies, she worked as a banker at Merrill Lynch for seven years and travelled frequently to China for business. In 2009, she founded the Mencius Mandarin Preschool in Greenwich, Connecticut and currently serves as the director of the school.

== Personal life ==
In 2008, Ng married David Rosa with whom she has two children, a son and daughter. The family currently resides in Greenwich, Connecticut.

== Filmography ==
=== Film ===
Year	Title	Role	Notes
1993	The Joy Luck Club	15-year-old Lindo	
1993	Heaven & Earth	Torture Girl #1	
1999	The Sterling Chase	Cathy	

=== Television ===
Year	Title	Role	Notes
1991	All My Children	An Li Chen Bodine #1	18 episodes
1996–1999	The Mystery Files of Shelby Woo	Shelby Woo	Main role
1996, 2008	Law & Order	Xuan-Lan Nguyen	Episode: "Double Blind"
1996, 2008	Law & Order	Employee	Episode: "Knock Off"
1997–1999	Figure It Out	Herself	13 episodes
1998	Teen Angel	Nia	Episode: "Look Ma, No Face"
2018	The Affair	Ms. Ma	Episode: #4.2
