= 12th Parliament of Singapore =

Parliament of Singapore between 2011 and 2015

- Majority parliament
- 10 October 2011 – 25 August 2015 (3 years, 10 months and 15 days)

House
- Seating arrangements of the House
- Speaker of Parliament: Michael Palmer 10 October 2011 – 12 December 2012; Charles Chong (acting) 12 December 2012 – 14 January 2013; Halimah Yacob 14 January 2013 – 7 August 2017
- Prime Minister: Lee Hsien Loong 7 May 2011 – 25 August 2015
- Leader of the Opposition: Low Thia Khiang 7 May 2011 – 25 August 2015

Session(s)

1st Session
- 10 October 2011 – 15 April 2014 (2 years, 6 months and 5 days)

2nd Session
- 16 May 2014 – 25 August 2015 (1 year, 3 months and 9 days)

Cabinet(s)

12th Cabinet
- Lee Hsien Loong; 10 October 2011 – 25 August 2015

Parliamentarians
Elected	NCMP	Nominated
87 (Note: 87 MPs were elected in the 2011 Singaporean general election. There is one vacant seat at dissolution.)	3	9
<11th	13th>

The 12th Parliament of Singapore was a meeting of the Parliament of Singapore. The first session commenced on 10 October 2011 and was prorogued on 15 April 2014; the second session began on 16 May 2014 and ended on 25 August 2015, with the final sitting held one week earlier on 18 August. The membership was set by the 2011 Singapore General Election on 7 May 2011 and changed twice due to expulsion of Hougang Single Member Constituency MP in 2012 and resignation of Punggol East Single Member Constituency MP and Speaker of Parliament over extra-marital affairs in 2013. A third seat fell vacant on 23 March 2015 following the death of Lee Kuan Yew, former Prime Minister of Singapore and MP of Tanjong Pagar Group Representation Constituency; with Lee's death, the 12th Parliament was the final Parliament term to feature at least one member from the pre-independence Legislative Assembly or from the inaugural Parliament.

The 12th Parliament was controlled by a People's Action Party majority, led by Prime Minister Lee Hsien Loong and members of the cabinet, which assumed power on 7 May 2011. The Opposition was led by the Secretary General of the Worker's Party of Singapore, Mr Low Thia Khiang. The Speaker of the Parliament of Singapore was Halimah Yacob, of the People's Action Party. She was elected as the 9th Speaker of the House for the 12th Parliament on 14 January 2013.

== Result of the 2011 Singaporean general election ==
Party	Votes	%	Seats	+/–
People's Action Party	1,212,154	60.14	81	–1
Workers' Party	258,510	12.83	8	+6
National Solidarity Party	242,682	12.04	0	New
Singapore Democratic Party	97,369	4.83	0	0
Reform Party	86,294	4.28	0	New
Singapore People's Party	62,639	3.11	1	New
Singapore Democratic Alliance	55,988	2.78	0	–1
Total	2,015,636	100.00	90	+5
Valid votes	2,015,636	97.83		
Invalid/blank votes	44,737	2.17		
Total votes	2,060,373	100.00		
Registered voters/turnout	2,350,873	93.18		
Source: Singapore Elections (Note: 139,771 of the 2,350,873 registered voters were in uncontested constituencies, leaving 2,211,102 voters able to vote.)

The Workers' Party and the Singapore People's Party, being the best performing opposition parties were awarded 2 and 1 Non-Constituency Member of Parliament Seat respectively in accordance with the Constitution. The NCMP Seats were held by Gerald Giam Yean Song and Yee Jenn Jong of the Workers' Party and Lina Chiam of Singapore People's Party.

== Officeholders ==
=== Speaker ===
- Speaker:
  - Michael Palmer (Punggol East SMC, PAP), until 14 December 2012
  - Charles Chong (Joo Chiat SMC, PAP), acting: 14 December 2012 – 13 January 2013
  - Halimah Yacob (Jurong GRC, PAP), from 14 January 2013
- Deputy Speaker:
  - Seah Kian Peng (Marine Parade GRC, PAP), from 17 October 2011
  - Charles Chong (Joo Chiat SMC, PAP), from 17 October 2011)

=== Leaders ===
- Prime Minister: Lee Hsien Loong (Ang Mo Kio GRC, PAP)
- Leader of the Opposition: Low Thia Khiang (Aljunied GRC, WP)

=== House Leaders ===
- Leader of the House: Ng Eng Hen (Bishan–Toa Payoh GRC, PAP)
- Deputy Leader of the House: Heng Chee How (Whampoa SMC, PAP)

=== Whips ===
- Government Party Whip: Gan Kim Yong (Chua Chu Kang GRC, PAP)
- Deputy Government Whip:
  - Teo Ho Pin (Bukit Panjang SMC, PAP)
  - Amy Khor (Hong Kah North SMC, PAP)

== Members ==
Constituency	Division	Member	Party
Aljunied GRC	Bedok Reservoir–Punggol	Low Thia Khiang	Workers' Party
Aljunied GRC	Eunos	Pritam Singh	Workers' Party
Aljunied GRC	Kaki Bukit	Faisal Manap	Workers' Party
Aljunied GRC	Paya Lebar	Chen Show Mao	Workers' Party
Aljunied GRC	Serangoon	Sylvia Lim	Workers' Party
Ang Mo Kio GRC	Ang Mo Kio–Hougang	Yeo Guat Kwang	People's Action Party
Ang Mo Kio GRC	Cheng San–Seletar	Ang Hin Kee	People's Action Party
Ang Mo Kio GRC	Jalan Kayu	Intan Azura Mokhtar	People's Action Party
Ang Mo Kio GRC	Kebun Baru	Inderjit Singh	People's Action Party
Ang Mo Kio GRC	Teck Ghee	Lee Hsien Loong	People's Action Party
Ang Mo Kio GRC	Yio Chu Kang	Seng Han Thong	People's Action Party
Bishan–Toa Payoh GRC	Bishan East	Wong Kan Seng	People's Action Party
Bishan–Toa Payoh GRC	Bishan North	Josephine Teo	People's Action Party
Bishan–Toa Payoh GRC	Thomson	Hri Kumar Nair	People's Action Party
Bishan–Toa Payoh GRC	Toa Payoh Central	Ng Eng Hen	People's Action Party
Bishan–Toa Payoh GRC	Toa Payoh East	Zainudin Nordin	People's Action Party
Bukit Panjang SMC		Teo Ho Pin	People's Action Party
Chua Chu Kang GRC	Bukit Gombak	Low Yen Ling	People's Action Party
Chua Chu Kang GRC	Chua Chu Kang	Gan Kim Yong	People's Action Party
Chua Chu Kang GRC	Keat Hong	Zaqy Mohamad	People's Action Party
Chua Chu Kang GRC	Nanyang	Alvin Yeo	People's Action Party
Chua Chu Kang GRC	Yew Tee	Alex Yam	People's Action Party
East Coast GRC	Bedok	Lim Swee Say	People's Action Party
East Coast GRC	Changi–Simei	Jessica Tan	People's Action Party
East Coast GRC	Fengshan	Raymond Lim	People's Action Party
East Coast GRC	Kampong Chai Chee	Lee Yi Shyan	People's Action Party
East Coast GRC	Siglap	Maliki Osman	People's Action Party
Holland–Bukit Timah GRC	Bukit Timah	Sim Ann	People's Action Party
Holland–Bukit Timah GRC	Cashew	Vivian Balakrishnan	People's Action Party
Holland–Bukit Timah GRC	Ulu Pandan	Christopher de Souza	People's Action Party
Holland–Bukit Timah GRC	Zhenghua	Liang Eng Hwa	People's Action Party
Hong Kah North SMC		Amy Khor	People's Action Party
Hougang SMC		Yaw Shin Leong (Note: Yaw Shin Leong resigned on 14 February 2012. The remaining MPs of Aljunied GRC acted as interim MPs for Hougang SMC from 14 February until 26 May 2012.)	Workers' Party
Hougang SMC		Png Eng Huat (Note: Png Eng Huat was by-elected on 26 May 2012, to succeed Yaw Shin Leong.)	Workers' Party
Joo Chiat SMC		Charles Chong	People's Action Party
Jurong GRC	Bukit Batok	David Ong	People's Action Party
Jurong GRC	Bukit Batok East	Halimah Yacob	People's Action Party
Jurong GRC	Jurong Central	Ang Wei Neng	People's Action Party
Jurong GRC	Jurong Spring	Desmond Lee	People's Action Party
Jurong GRC	Taman Jurong	Tharman Shanmugaratnam	People's Action Party
Marine Parade GRC	Braddell Heights	Seah Kian Peng	People's Action Party
Marine Parade GRC	Geylang Serai	Fatimah Lateef	People's Action Party
Marine Parade GRC	Kembangan–Chai Chee	Tan Chuan-Jin	People's Action Party
Marine Parade GRC	MacPherson	Tin Pei Ling	People's Action Party
Marine Parade GRC	Marine Parade	Goh Chok Tong	People's Action Party
Moulmein–Kallang GRC	Jalan Besar	Edwin Tong	People's Action Party
Moulmein–Kallang GRC	Kampong Glam	Denise Phua	People's Action Party
Moulmein–Kallang GRC	Kolam Ayer	Yaacob Ibrahim	People's Action Party
Moulmein–Kallang GRC	Moulmein	Lui Tuck Yew	People's Action Party
Mountbatten SMC		Lim Biow Chuan	People's Action Party
Nee Soon GRC	Canberra	Lim Wee Kiak	People's Action Party
Nee Soon GRC	Chong Pang	K. Shanmugam	People's Action Party
Nee Soon GRC	Nee Soon Central	Faishal Ibrahim	People's Action Party
Nee Soon GRC	Nee Soon East	Patrick Tay	People's Action Party
Nee Soon GRC	Nee Soon South	Lee Bee Wah	People's Action Party
Pasir Ris–Punggol GRC	Pasir Ris East	Zainal Sapari	People's Action Party
Pasir Ris–Punggol GRC	Pasir Ris West	Teo Chee Hean	People's Action Party
Pasir Ris–Punggol GRC	Punggol Central	Teo Ser Luck	People's Action Party
Pasir Ris–Punggol GRC	Punggol North	Penny Low	People's Action Party
Pasir Ris–Punggol GRC	Punggol South	Gan Thiam Poh	People's Action Party
Pasir Ris–Punggol GRC	Punggol West	Janil Puthucheary	People's Action Party
Pioneer SMC		Cedric Foo	People's Action Party
Potong Pasir SMC		Sitoh Yih Pin	People's Action Party
Punggol East SMC		Michael Palmer (Note: Michael Palmer resigned on 12 December 2012. Pasir Ris–Punggol GRC MP Teo Ser Luck acted as interim MP for Punggol East SMC from 12 December until 26 January 2012.)	People's Action Party
Punggol East SMC		Lee Li Lian (Note: Lee Li Lian was by-elected on 26 January 2013, to succeed Michael Palmer.)	Workers' Party
Radin Mas SMC		Sam Tan	People's Action Party
Sembawang GRC	Admiralty	Vikram Nair	People's Action Party
Sembawang GRC	Marsiling	Hawazi Daipi	People's Action Party
Sembawang GRC	Sembawang	Khaw Boon Wan	People's Action Party
Sembawang GRC	Woodgrove	Ong Teng Koon	People's Action Party
Sembawang GRC	Woodlands	Ellen Lee	People's Action Party
Sengkang West SMC		Lam Pin Min	People's Action Party
Tampines GRC	Tampines Central	Heng Swee Keat	People's Action Party
Tampines GRC	Tampines Changkat	Irene Ng	People's Action Party
Tampines GRC	Tampines East	Mah Bow Tan	People's Action Party
Tampines GRC	Tampines North	Baey Yam Keng	People's Action Party
Tampines GRC	Tampines West	Masagos Zulkifli	People's Action Party
Tanjong Pagar GRC	Buona Vista	Chan Chun Sing	People's Action Party
Tanjong Pagar GRC	Kreta Ayer–Kim Seng	Lily Neo	People's Action Party
Tanjong Pagar GRC	Queenstown	Chia Shi-Lu	People's Action Party
Tanjong Pagar GRC	Tanglin–Cairnhill	Indranee Rajah	People's Action Party
Tanjong Pagar GRC	Tanjong Pagar–Tiong Bahru	Lee Kuan Yew (Note: Lee Kuan Yew died on 23 March 2015. MP Indranee Rajah of Tanjong Pagar Group Representation Constituency's Tanglin–Cairnhill division acted as interim MP for Tanjong Pagar–Tiong Bahru division.)	People's Action Party
West Coast GRC	Ayer Rajah	Foo Mee Har	People's Action Party
West Coast GRC	Boon Lay	Lawrence Wong	People's Action Party
West Coast GRC	Clementi	Arthur Fong	People's Action Party
West Coast GRC	Telok Blangah	Lim Hng Kiang	People's Action Party
West Coast GRC	West Coast	S. Iswaran	People's Action Party
Whampoa SMC		Heng Chee How	People's Action Party
Yuhua SMC		Grace Fu	People's Action Party
Non-constituency Members of Parliament		Gerald Giam	Workers' Party
Non-constituency Members of Parliament		Lina Loh	Singapore People's Party
Non-constituency Members of Parliament		Yee Jenn Jong	Workers' Party
Nominated Members of Parliament		R. Dhinakaran (Note: Served as Nominated Member of Parliament from 14 February 2012 until 13 August 2014.)	Nonpartisan
Nominated Members of Parliament		Faizah Jamal	Nonpartisan
Nominated Members of Parliament		Nicholas Fang	Nonpartisan
Nominated Members of Parliament		Janice Koh	Nonpartisan
Nominated Members of Parliament		Laurence Lieng	Nonpartisan
Nominated Members of Parliament		Mary Liew	Nonpartisan
Nominated Members of Parliament		Eugene Tan	Nonpartisan
Nominated Members of Parliament		Tan Su Shan	Nonpartisan
Nominated Members of Parliament		Teo Siong Seng	Nonpartisan
Nominated Members of Parliament		Chia Yong Yong (Note: Served as Nominated Member of Parliament from 26 August 2014.)	Nonpartisan
Nominated Members of Parliament		Thomas Chua	Nonpartisan
Nominated Members of Parliament		Ismail Hussein	Nonpartisan
Nominated Members of Parliament		K. Karthikeyan	Nonpartisan
Nominated Members of Parliament		Kuik Shiao-Yin	Nonpartisan
Nominated Members of Parliament		Rita Soh	Nonpartisan
Nominated Members of Parliament		Benedict Tan	Nonpartisan
Nominated Members of Parliament		Randolph Tan	Nonpartisan
Nominated Members of Parliament		Tan Tai Yong	Nonpartisan
