= 2013 Punggol East by-election =

Parliamentary by-election in Singapore

- 26 January 2013
- Registered: 31,649
- Turnout: 29,859 (94.34%) ▼0.94%

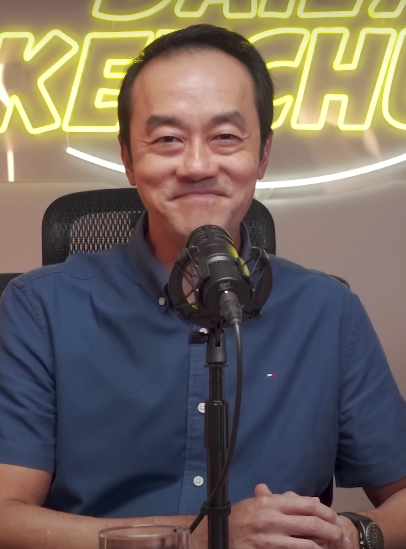

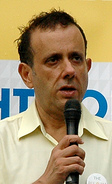

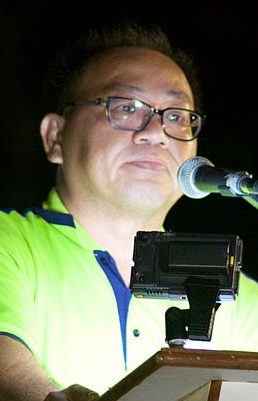
	First party	Second party
Candidate	Lee Li Lian	Koh Poh Koon
Party	WP	PAP
Popular vote	16,045	12,875
Percentage	54.50%	43.73%
Swing	▲13.49%	▼10.81%
	Third party	Fourth party
Candidate	Kenneth Jeyaretnam	Desmond Lim
Party	RP	SDA
Popular vote	353	168
Percentage	1.20%	0.57%
Swing	▲1.20%	▼3.88%
MP before election
Michael Palmer
PAP
Elected MP
Lee Li Lian
WP

On 26 January 2013, a parliamentary by-election occurred in Punggol East Single Member Constituency in Singapore. It was held to replace the vacant seat left by Speaker and Member of Parliament (MP) Michael Palmer, who had resigned from the People's Action Party (PAP) following revelations of his extramarital affair. This marked the 16th by-election since Singapore's first election in 1948 and came months after the 2012 Hougang by-election, which occurred under similar circumstances but involved a different MP from the Workers' Party (WP).

On nomination day, Desmond Lim, the leader of the Singapore Democratic Alliance (SDA), and Lee Li Lian, a WP member, registered to contest the constituency, having contested the 2011 general election. The PAP fielded debutant Koh Poh Koon, who had joined the party months prior. Reform Party (RP) leader Kenneth Jeyaretnam was also nominated, resulting in a rare four-cornered contest. (Note: The last instance of a four-cornered fight last occurred during the 1997 elections, where a four-way fight unfolded at Chua Chu Kang SMC. 2011 presidential election also saw a four-cornered contest after four presidential candidates were deemed eligible.)

On polling day, Lee won the by-election for the WP, garnering 54.50% of the vote against Koh's 43.73%. The remaining two candidates fell short of the 12.5% threshold required to retain their election deposits. Lee was sworn into Parliament on 4 February.

== Background ==
On 8 December 2012, local tabloid The New Paper reported receiving a tip-off in the form of screengrabs of phone messages suggesting that Palmer was involved in an affair. The messages indicated a close relationship between Palmer and the other party, with regular meetings on Mondays. The tabloid also reported that the relationship had lasted for a year. On the same day of the exposé, Palmer met Deputy Prime Minister Teo Chee Hean to tender his resignation as Speaker and MP. The following day, Prime Minister Lee Hsien Loong met Palmer to formally confirm his resignation. Subsequently, the by-election was called by President Tony Tan on the advice of the Prime Minister following the vacation.

On 12 December 2012, the PAP held a press conference where Palmer announced his resignation, stating he was stepping down to "take full responsibility for a grave mistake" involving an improper relationship with a People's Association (PA) staff member, Laura Ong, who worked in the Pasir Ris West constituency office, (Note: The Pasir Ris West division in the Pasir Ris–Punggol Group Representation Constituency is overseen by Teo Chee Hean at the time of the incident.) Although Ong did not report directly to Palmer, they collaborated on constituency matters within the Pasir Ris–Punggol division. Ong has since resigned from PA after the incident surfaced, citing "family commitments".

Palmer's responsibilities as MP for Punggol East SMC were tentatively fulfilled by Teo Ser Luck, incumbent Pasir Ris–Punggol GRC MP, Minister of State and North East CDC Mayor, pending the election of a new MP. Zainal Sapari assumed his role of a chairman of the Pasir Ris–Punggol Town Council. Deputy Speaker Charles Chong served as Acting Speaker until 14 January 2013, when Halimah Yacob was appointed as the new Speaker.

=== Confirmation of by-election ===
On 9 January 2013, President Tan issued a writ of election for the electoral division of Punggol East. The nominations were held on 16 January at North Vista Secondary School and voting took place on 26 January. On the following day, PM Lee stated on media about his reasons of calling a by-election one month later citing that the residents will need to have another representative MP to prepare for the upcoming government agenda, billed as one of the busiest times to date.

=== Punggol East SMC ===

As of 9 January 2013, there were 31,649 registered voters, of which 59 were registered as overseas voters. Punggol East have nine polling stations across the constituency, and ballot boxes were sent to either one of the two counting centers, namely North Vista Secondary School and Rivervale Primary School.

== Candidates ==
Four candidates were successfully nominated for this election:

Candidates	Party	Background
Koh Poh Koon	People's Action Party	Having joined the PAP a month prior to the by-election, Koh, a 40-year-old colorectal surgeon from Mount Elizabeth Medical Centre made its electoral debut this election. Koh was the first candidate to announce candidacy on 10 January.
Lee Li Lian	Worker's Party	A member of the WP, Lee, a sales trainer of Singaporean insurance company Great Eastern Life, made her debut in the last general election contesting in Punggol East SMC. The WP announced her candidacy on 14 January.
Desmond Lim	Singapore Democratic Alliance	The secretary-general of SDA since 2011 and a member of the Singapore Justice Party, Lim and SDA announced their candidacy on 15 January. As with Lee, Lim also contested Punggol East SMC in the last general election (resulting in that election's only three-way contest), but ended up garnering under 12.5% of the valid votes cast and become the only candidate that election to have his S$16,000 election deposit forfeited.
Kenneth Jeyaretnam	Reform Party	The secretary-general for RP, Jeyaretnam, a hedge fund manager and the son of the late WP's leader and RP founder J. B. Jeyaretnam, announced his candidacy on 15 January, shortly after SDA. Jeyaretnam also made his electoral debut in the 2011 general election as part of the RP team contesting West Coast GRC.

Two other men had applied for political donation certificates but were not nominated as candidates:

Candidates	Background
Ooi Boon Ewe	Ooi was a founder of the People's Liberal Democratic Party (PLDP), who he withdraw from the party sometime in 2011. During nomination day, he was unable to find his assentors, and claimed that he had misplaced his political donation certificate and his electoral deposit being stolen by his driver. As a result of those losses, he ultimately withdrew from the nomination.
Zeng Guoyuan	Zeng was a retired acupuncturist and former WP candidate. While Zeng had collected his certificate, he ultimately decided not to contest due to his alleged suspicions and the higher profile among other candidates.

The Singapore Democratic Party (SDP) initially expressed interest in contesting the election, with the SDP attempting to broker a deal with WP for a joint alliance, but later withdrew on 15 January. The Democratic Progressive Party (DPP) and former Singapore People's Party (SPP) member Benjamin Pwee also expressed interest into contesting the by-election, but later withdrew citing logistics reasons.

== Campaigning ==
=== Summary of election rallies ===
On Nomination Day, 16 January, the Singapore Police Force issued a list of sites available for rallies ("electoral meetings"). They could be held from 16 January to 24 January between 7am to 10pm. It was also announced that the Speakers' Corner would not serve as an "unrestricted area" during the campaigning period. All rallies below were held between 7pm to 10pm.

Party	18 January	19 January	20 January	21 January	22 January	23 January	24 January
PAP	Field near Block 128C Punggol Walk	NA	NA	NA	NA	Field near Block 128C Punggol Walk	North Vista Secondary School
WP	NA	Field near Block 128C Punggol Walk	NA	NA	Field near Block 128C Punggol Walk	North Vista Secondary School	NA
SDA	NA	NA	NA	Online e-rally	NA	NA	NA
RP	NA	NA	Field near Block 128C Punggol Walk	NA	NA	NA	Field near Block 128C Punggol Walk

=== PAP plans ===
Dubbed as "son of Punggol", Koh outlined many plans in his manifesto and would like to run his own campaign by himself without backup from their activists nor PAP MPs, the same way as how Desmond Choo ran on his campaign in the last year's by-election; while grassroots activists and supporters felt comfortable on their decision unlike Hougang, Deputy Prime Minister Teo Chee Hean hinted in an interview that the results will be close given a multi-cornered contest. Koh said that he would wish to address problems and issues by the electorate in Rivervale, most notably the transportation and rail network, and the expedition of the renovations in the Rivervale Plaza, which was earlier stalled in August 2012 after the previous contractors, Technobuilt Construction & Engineering, faced liquidation, and was replaced by Hak Kian Enterprise. The mall was expected to be completed in June.

While Punggol East is brand-new due to the new housing developments in the eastern Sengkang, Koh said that he would work closely with the government to ensure meeting the same demands as once Palmer did, and to overcome the geopolitical trends as part of the promise made in the last election.

=== WP plans ===
The WP was the first party to express interest in contesting the by-election immediately after Palmer's resignation, which WP chief Low Thia Khiang, while conducting his Meet-the-People Sessions at Bedok Reservoir that same night, felt surprised about the news that broke, but also told that it should not draw parallel lines to the case of Yaw Shin Leong, as it would be unfair for both cases.

Lee was hoping that if she is elected, she will pledge that she and Low would add more scrutiny to the government and the management over the Aljunied–Hougang Town Council; Low told the media that she was the best choice to run on her campaign and said she will be a great asset if elected. She would make door-to-door visits for the two-fifths of the electorate first before focusing on the other three-fifths the same way she did during her previous campaign. Eventually, she completed the house visits before the cooling-off day. Like Koh, Lee also pledges scrutiny on policies towards rail networking and childcare.

Lee was the sole female candidate to be nominated for the by-election. Prior to the by-election, no female opposition candidates had ever won a SMC since independence; the first female opposition-elect, chairwoman Sylvia Lim, however, was from the Aljunied GRC.

=== SDA plans ===
Desmond Lim, who made his second attempt for the ward, had been loudly jeered by other supporters while delivering his nomination speech, declaring that he is "determined" with an "underdog indefatigably". Lim mentioned that he would want to make a difference in providing opposition unity, adding that he also pledged a 10% donation of his MP allowance, and outlined plans for the next five years by setting up a resident’s cooperative, building infrastructures, and hosting a Satay Club, in the constituency if he is elected. In an election's first, the SDA's Desmond Lim opted out of physical campaigning and used online rallies by posting on YouTube instead.

=== RP plans ===
Ahead of the campaign, Kenneth Jeyaretnam and his family received death threats online for his decision to contest, but it was revealed in the media that he would want to see a third elected party to represent in parliament to promote competition. A security team from the RP ramped up security efforts to protect Jeyaretnam and his family from harassment and would lodge a police report. The perpetrator was later arrested on January 23. While he also released his five-year plan like other candidates did, he also told residents that he could not assure expensive million-dollar projects. In an interview, he also pledged to be a full-time MP, with a donation of a tenth of his allowance to the charity, and building more childcare centres as priority.

=== Campaigning ===
During the first three nights, three of the four political parties held their first rally at an open field near 183C Rivervale Crescent. On 18 January, PAP's Koh revealed his past life growing up in a poor family and emphasized the resilience to vote with "hope, family and action"; this speech won praise from several PAP leaders and supporters, given his grassroots background dating back in 2002. Education Minister Heng Swee Keat and its Senior Minister of State counterpart Indranee Rajah put emphasis on the younger electorate and advocated financial support in terms of the low-income and housing purchases.

The following night, WP held their first rally and highlighted their track record for their involvement in parliament and boasted it to be "rational and responsible", but they would prefer more voices to improve democracy. Unlike in Hougang, the PAP's deflection towards them was relatively lighter; WP noted that questions can be referred to the ministries and treated equally as the same as the backbencher MPs does. Chairwoman Sylvia Lim mentioned that the party is "constructive and pro-Singapore" and doesn't believe in maiming the government, and promoting feminism as Lee is also a female candidate; Chief Low mentioned about making Singapore better with equality in politics regardless of affiliation, but they however slammed PAP with the issues relating to the current cost-of-living and immigration. In turn, both PAP and WP each pitched on different ideals, one that kept commitment to current plans, and another that pushed the government for better accountability.

RP took their first rally after WP, assuring that they can not be trusted into bigger names, and that they can also propose ideas and new policies better than the two if he wins. RP also accused on WP's mismanagement and topics which they did not address during Parliament. Some former supporters of the late father J. B. resonated during the rally, but Kenneth said that legacy is also important, referencing J. B.'s presence in the Parliament. While plans to call off the rally were made, however, it was announced that the rally would proceed as usual with security measures in place.

In a first for any elections history, Desmond Lim posted his videos online on 21 January in YouTube in-lieu of hosting public rallies, due to budget reasons. Lim addressed with key concerns and manifesto but also refuted claims of vote buying; Lim also countered PAP and WP's moves by highlighting its flaws on each, and proposals on the new "Punggol East Town Council" sharing with his experience as a town councilor back in Potong Pasir. A series of 10 videos, each highlighting key areas and concerns, were posted, which garnered a modest amount of views. However, his videos were also criticized for his English fluency.

In WP's second rally, they revealed their challenges in the management over the Aljunied–Hougang Town Council which had first surfaced the previous year and clarified concerns, such as the change of the accounting protocols and the drop of the Action Information Management (AIM), which were previously used by the PAP-held town councils, and in turn, directed to the coordinating chairman of the PAP-run town councils Teo Ho Pin, who is also the chairman of Holland–Bukit Panjang Town Council. However, their current parliamentary issues such as population or foreign workers were not mentioned, which surprised PAP. WP also mentioned that alliance by oppositions are unlikely practical, likely as a nod that WP chose not to respond to the Singapore Democratic Party (SDP) who attempted to form an alliance with them prior to nomination day.

Before PAP's second rally on the following day, Teo said that when it comes to polling they must choose one candidate who they believe to serve Punggol East in the best on their voter's instincts as each candidate had offered different views and perspectives. At their final rally the night after, several PAP MPs and leaders voiced their endorsement and recommendation to Koh; Prime Minister Lee said that the choice of voters they made could either make cohesion to politics or cause division, before concluding the rally by promoting Koh's endeavors.

Elsewhere on North Vista Secondary School, WP hosted its third and final rally, with Low bringing up the cases of unforeseen events, such as Steve Tan pulling out of the Tampines GRC team prior to the nomination day (Tan was substituted by Baey Yam Keng instead), as its regime is corrupted, and WP will act as insurance. He added about the obstacles for oppositions and criticized the government's policies and the money management to try to throw oppositions out, as well as those immigration issues and ongoing problems such as the train breakdowns, which they called it as "losing its sense of identity", and would want to treat immigrants equal. WP revisited the Town Council matters and recalled the software used for the systems, how they decided not to use AIM for its own software after WP terminated their contract, and how they used theirs like those similar to the former Hougang Town Council. The WP also introduced Daniel Goh, who would later make its actual appearance in the next election.

RP concluded their final rally through attacks citing PAP and WP were "blindly obedient". Jeyaretnam aims to use the same principles that once his father used, and that opposition unity is unlikely. However, RP also emphasized that the choices made rested on their opinions, to whether to continue the same two-party trend or to improve with the addition of another opposition party.

=== Exit poll incident ===
On 10 January, the day after the writ of election was issued, The Straits Times chief editor Warren Fernandez posted an article asking about 50 residents on who they vote for, with 19 supporting PAP to 10 WP, and 21 undecided. The article was later taken down hours after the Election Department issued a notice and take down to Fernandez. When investigated by the police three days later, Fernandez insisted that the article is not a survey nor a poll, citing that the article "overstated the significance of the information gathered". He also added that "the edge that the ruling party appears to hold may be a reflection of the incumbency advantage it has always held in a middle class, traditionally PAP-leading ward", referencing that the Punggol East had been held by the PAP and those before the creation of the division, such as the Cheng San GRC. (Note: The Sengkang planning area was part of the Cheng San GRC between 1991 and 2001 before being redrawn to the current Pasir Ris–Punggol GRC. Cheng San GRC was also contested by the WP in 1997.)

On 20 June, the Attorney-General's Chambers (AGC) issued Fernandez a warning after the investigations concluded, revealing that the article amounts to an exit poll, where posting of such articles between the issuance of writ until polling day, is forbidden under Chapter 218 of the Parliamentary Elections Act. Penalties under this clause carries a maximum $1,500 fine or up to a year of imprisonment, or both.

== Results ==
15 minutes before the results were announced, SDA's Desmond Lim conceded at about 10.42pm (SGT) thanking his supporters and vowed to 'keep SDA's flame alive' in the next election. A SDA spokesperson released a statement that they had entered this by-election despite anticipating the risks of vote splitting, but they did so to upheld their alliance's morale; SDA also added they will continue to work hard in the next election.

At 10.57pm SGT, the results was announced when WP's Lee was declared candidate-elect with 54.52% out of 29,415 valid votes, defeating PAP opponent Koh with 43.71% of the vote. Two candidates had forfeited their $14,500 election deposit for garnering below the 12.5% threshold, namely Kenneth Jeyaretnam of the RP and Desmond Lim of the SDA with 1.20% and 0.57% of the votes respectively, with the latter becoming the second candidate to have his election deposit forfeited twice since Harbans Singh, and setting a record-low vote share at the time of the election surpassing Teo Kim Hoe's former record of 196 votes or 0.81% in post-independence Singapore.

Overseas votes were tabulated four days after the by-election, on 30 January, seeing a 0.02% change in the top two parties after Koh and Lee received 19 and 7 votes respectively (there is only one spoilt and 32 abstained votes). The results are as follows:

By-Election 2013: Punggol East
Party	Candidate	Votes	%	±%
WP	Lee Li Lian	16,045	54.50	▲13.49
PAP	Koh Poh Koon	12,875	43.73	▼10.81
RP	Kenneth Jeyaretnam	353	1.20	N/A
SDA	Desmond Lim	168	0.57	▼3.88
Rejected ballots		418	1.40	▼0.3
Margin of victory		3,170	10.77	▼2.76
Turnout		29,859	94.31	▼0.99
Registered electors		31,649		▼4.9%
WP gain from PAP		Swing	▲12.15	

== Aftermath ==
The election was seen as another setback for the PAP following the formation of the 12th Parliament after the 2011 election, when the WP won Aljunied GRC. At the time, it appeared that public support for the PAP was waning. The WP made history with Lee Li Lian becoming the first female opposition MP in post-independence Singapore to helm a SMC and the second female opposition MP after WP chairwoman Sylvia Lim. It was also only the second instance of the PAP losing a parliamentary seat mid-term to the opposition, the first being in 1981 when the WP captured Anson.

Prime Minister Lee congratulated the WP on their victory and expressed respect for the voters' decision, noting that by-elections are often about choosing an MP rather than a government, and acknowledging that some voters may use them to support the opposition. He added that the government would focus on pressing national issues in Parliament, including the Population White Paper (PWP) and the annual Budget statement. Lee emphasised that the PAP was prepared for the long term, committed to delivering results, improving the lives of Singaporeans and presenting their performance for voters to assess in the next general election. Lee also added that he has intention to include Koh in the cabinet in the near future should he got elected in the next general election. In a press conference after the by-election, Deputy Prime Minister Teo Chee Hean thanked their voters and supporters and took their defeat graciously, reiterating that the loss was another example of a "by-election effect" and the results in the prior general election further emphasized on their causes for their defeat. Koh also told that he would continue to serve politics whenever he felt "appropriate and the best place".

Similarly, WP chief Low Thia Khiang told the media that voters should not take the by-election result for granted and emphasized that the WP would continue to hold the government accountable while representing their constituents. WP chair Sylvia Lim also respect the results with "gratitude and humility", while WP-elect Lee told that she will work hard for the trust as she begin her duties.

=== Subsequent elections ===
In the 2015 general election, PAP's Koh was elected as an MP for the Yio Chu Kang division under Ang Mo Kio GRC, and later represented Tampines Central in Tampines GRC during the 2020 and 2025 general elections. WP's Lee Li Lian was unable to retain Punggol East in 2015, losing narrowly to the PAP candidate Charles Chong, returning the constituency to PAP control. Punggol East was later dissolved during the 2020 general election and absorbed into the newly formed Sengkang GRC. The WP would go on to win the GRC, effectively returning the area formerly known as Punggol East, now Rivervale, to the party, with Louis Chua assuming the division. As of 2025, the ward remains under WP's control.

The next time a four-cornered contest would occur in any Singaporean election was in 2025, 12 years later, where a four-way race unfolded in Tampines GRC between the PAP, whose team coincidentally included Koh, the WP, led by former Aljunied GRC MP Faisal Manap, the National Solidarity Party (NSP) and the People's Power Party (PPP). The PAP team retained that constituency with 52.02%, beating WP's team of 47.37%. Both PPP and NSP teams fared worse, as they received only 0.43% and 0.18% of the valid votes respectively and had both parties losing their deposits; both teams also surpassed Lim's score of 0.57%, setting its new record-lowest scores in post-independence Singapore, and even surpassing independent candidate Chua Kim Watt's 0.55% of the vote in the Farrer Park Constituency set way back in 1955.
