= Group representation constituency =

Type of electoral division in Singapore

A group representation constituency (Note: simplified Chinese: 集选区; traditional Chinese: 集選區; pinyin: jíxuǎnqū; Malay: kawasan undi perwakilan berkumpulan, Jawi: كاوسن اوندي ڤرواكيلن بركومڤولن; Tamil: குழுத்தொகுதி, romanized: kuḻuttokuti) (GRC) is a type of electoral division or constituency in Singapore in which teams of candidates, instead of individual candidates, compete to be elected into Parliament as the Members of Parliament (MPs) for the constituency. Synonymous to the party block voting (PBV) or the general ticket used in other countries, the Government stated that the GRC scheme was primarily implemented to enshrine minority representation in Parliament: at least one of the MPs in a GRC must be a member of the Malay, Indian or another minority community of Singapore. In addition, it was economical for town councils, which manage public housing estates, to handle larger constituencies.

The GRC scheme came into effect on 1 June 1988, and was first introduced at the general election that same year. Prior to that date, all constituencies were Single Member Constituencies (SMCs). The Parliamentary Elections Act (Cap. 218, 2008 Rev. Ed.) ("PEA") states that there must be at least eight SMCs, and the number of MPs to be returned by all GRCs cannot be less than a quarter of the total number of MPs. Within those parameters the total number of SMCs and GRCs in Singapore and their boundaries are not fixed but are decided by the Cabinet, taking into consideration the recommendations of the Electoral Boundaries Review Committee. Per the Constitution and the PEA, there must be between three and six MPs in a GRC. The number of MPs in each GRC is declared by the President at the Cabinet's direction before a general election. As of the latest 2025 general election, there were 15 SMCs, 8 four-member GRCs and 10 five-member GRCs, totalling 97 MPs.

Reception towards to the GRC system is mixed, with some critics disagreeing with the government's justifications for introducing the scheme, noting that the proportion of minority MPs per GRC has rather decreased with the advent of five-member and six-member GRCs, though process of reducing its average size of GRCs were gradually reduced in subsequent elections in favour of SMCs. In addition, the ruling People's Action Party (PAP) has been described as using GRCs as a means of bringing in politically inexperienced candidates into Parliament by "riding on the coattails" of GRCs helmed by senior politicians, particularly Cabinet members who are deployed to each incumbent PAP-held GRC, as "anchor ministers". Moreover, the GRC scheme is also noted to particularly disadvantage opposition parties, by raising the threshold to find sufficient candidates with the political expertise and capability to contest GRCs. Furthermore, it is said that the GRC scheme means that electors may have unequal voting power, weakens the relationship between electors and MPs, and entrenches racialism in Singapore politics due to its emphasis on minority representation.

== History ==
There are two types of electoral division or constituency in Singapore: the single member constituency (SMC) and the group representation constituency (GRC). In a GRC, a number of candidates comes together to stand for elections to Parliament as a group. Each voter of a GRC casts a ballot for a team of candidates, and not for individual candidates. The GRC scheme was brought into existence on 1 June 1988 by the Constitution of the Republic of Singapore (Amendment) Act 1988 and the Parliamentary Elections (Amendment) Act 1988.

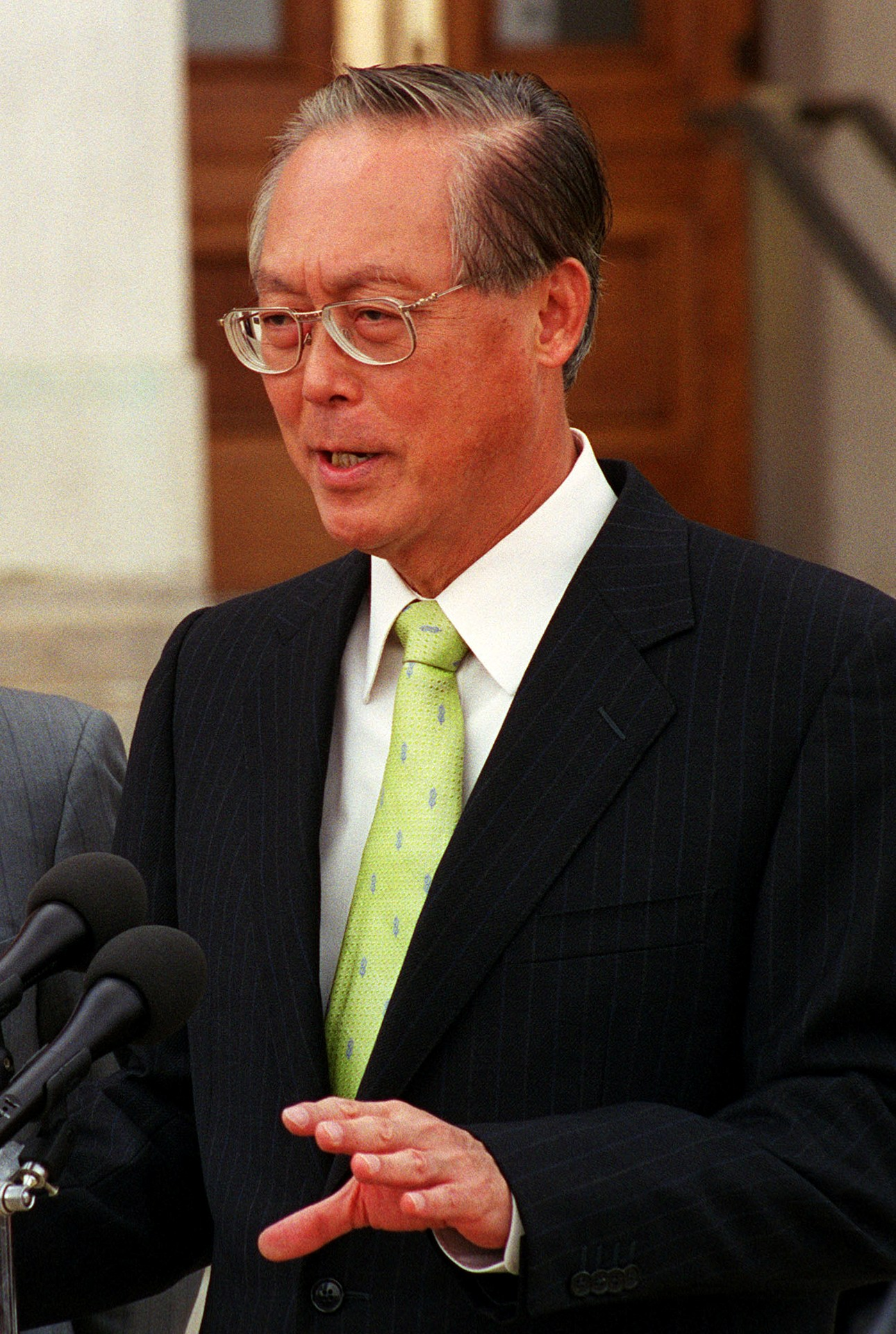
In 1988, First Deputy Prime Minister Goh Chok Tong (pictured here in June 2001) supported GRCs on the ground that they would ensure that Parliament always remained multiracial.

The original stated purpose of GRCs was to guarantee a minimum representation of minorities in Parliament and ensure that there would always be a multiracial Parliament instead of one made up of a single race. Speaking in Parliament during the debate on whether GRCs should be introduced, First Deputy Prime Minister and Minister for Defence Goh Chok Tong said he had first discussed the necessity of ensuring the multiracial nature of Parliament with Prime Minister Lee Kuan Yew in July 1982. Then, Lee had expressed concern about the voting patterns of younger Singaporeans, who appeared to be apathetic to the need of having a racially balanced slate of candidates. He was also worried about more Singaporeans voting along racial lines, which would lead to a lack of minority representation in Parliament.

Lee had also proposed to twin constituencies and have Members of Parliament (MPs) contest as a pair, one of whom had to be from a minority community. However, Malay MPs were upset that this implied they were not electable on their own merits. Feeling that the twinning of constituencies would lead to Malay MPs losing confidence and self-respect, the Government dropped the proposal.

Therefore, the Government felt that the best way to ensure minority representation in Parliament was to introduce the GRC scheme. In addition, it took the view that such a scheme would complement the introduction of town councils to manage public housing estates, as it would be economical for a town council to manage a group of three constituencies. Subsequently, in 1991, the Government said that GRCs also minimized the need to redraw the boundaries of constituencies which had grown too big for the MPs serving them, and, in 1996, GRCs were said to provide Community Development Councils with the critical mass of residents that they needed to be effective.

Three proposals for minority representation in Parliament had been considered by a 1966 Constitutional Commission chaired by the Chief Justice Wee Chong Jin. The first was to have a committee of representatives of minorities that would elect three persons from amongst its members to represent minorities in Parliament. However, this was rejected as the Commission felt that it would be an inappropriate and retrogressive move in that unelected members should not be allowed to dilute the elected chamber. The second proposal, which was to have proportional representation, was also rejected on the grounds that it would intensify party politics along racial lines and eventually "perpetuate and accentuate racial differences". This would then make it increasingly difficult, if not impossible, to achieve a single homogeneous community out of the many races that form the population of the Republic. The third proposal was to have an upper house in Parliament composed of members elected or nominated to represent the racial, linguistic and religious minorities in Singapore. This proposal was also scrapped because of backward-looking since politicians should attain a seat in Parliament through taking part in elections.

In 1988, 39 SMCs were grouped into 13 three-member GRCs, making up 39 out of a total of 81 elected seats in Parliament. The Constitution and the Parliamentary Elections Act were changed in 1991 and again in 1996 to increase the maximum number of MPs in each GRC from three to four, and then to six. The 2001 and 2006 elections had only nine SMCs and 14 GRCs of five or six MPs, with a peak staggering at 5.36 MPs; it also marked the first time where at least two existing GRCs have its electoral boundaries being intact from the last general election, with each subsequent election saw between two and five GRCs being untouched.

On 27 May 2009, the Government announced that it would refine the size and number of GRCs. This could be achieved without amending either the Constitution or the Parliamentary Elections Act. Instead, when the next EBRC was appointed, its terms of reference would instruct the Committee to plan for fewer six-member GRCs than at present, and to reduce the average size of each GRC. The new configuration have to abide to the clause of not exceeding an average of five MPs with more than 12 SMCs, to account for the adaptability of increased electorate, and improve rationale on connecting between voters and MPs. In the 2011 general election, SMCs returned to Parliament 12 MPs and 15 GRCs a total of 75 MPs. Thereafter, the average size of GRCs was gradually reduced and the number of SMC was increased, which result in the removal of six-member GRCs beginning in 2020.

In 2023, Progress Singapore Party's (PSP) non-constituency Member of Parliament (NCMP), Hazel Poa, raised a private member's motion to abolish GRC, citing outcomes where candidates ride on the coattails of more established teammates, reduced voters' choice over election results. During the parliament debate, Poa mentioned vacancies in the GRC when MPs resign from their seat midterm, citing Halimah Yacob's resignation in 2017 to contest in the 2017 Singaporean presidential election and Tharman Shanmugaratnam's upcoming resignation to contest in the 2023 Singaporean presidential election. Chan Chun Sing, Minister-in-charge of the Public Service, in response to Poa, said WP and PSP also relied on the "star power" of Low Thia Khiang and Tan Cheng Bock to win Aljunied GRC in 2011 and PSP having NCMPs now in parliament. Leader of the Opposition and Workers' Party's (WP) chief Pritam Singh also highlighted the usage of GRC for gerrymandering, citing the merging of SMCs, in close contest between PAP and WP, into GRC in the next election. WP also called for the abolition of GRCs. Senior Minister Teo Chee Hean responded that accusations of gerrymandering existed long ago and asked Singh to suggest to EBRC to break up opposition held GRCs into SMCs. However, these motions were ultimately rejected by Parliament.

== Operation ==
=== Number and boundaries of electoral divisions ===
Apart from the requirement that there must be at least eight SMCs, the total number of SMCs and GRCs in Singapore and their boundaries are not fixed. The number of electoral divisions and their names and boundaries are specified by the Prime Minister from time to time by notification in the Government Gazette.

SMCs and GRCs in the 2025 general election

Since 1954, a year ahead of the 1955 general election, the Electoral Boundaries Review Committee (EBRC) has been appointed to advise the executive on the number and geographical division of electoral divisions. Even though neither the Constitution nor any law requires this to be done, the prime minister has continued to do so from Singapore's independence in 1965. This is generally done just before a general election to review the boundaries of electoral divisions and recommend changes. In recent decades, the Committee has been chaired by the Cabinet Secretary and has had four other members who are senior public servants. In the EBRC appointed before the general election of 2006, these were the head of the Elections Department, the chief executive officer of the Singapore Land Authority, the Deputy CEO of the Housing and Development Board and the Acting Chief Statistician. Since the Committee is only convened shortly before general elections, the preparatory work for boundary delimitation is done by its secretariat the Elections Department, which is a division of the Prime Minister's Office.

The EBRC's terms of reference are issued by the prime minister, and are not embodied in legislation. In giving recommendations for boundary changes over the years, the Committee has considered various factors, including using hill ridges, rivers and roads as boundaries rather than arbitrarily drawn lines; and the need for electoral divisions to have approximately equal numbers of voters so that electors' votes carry the same weight regardless of where they cast their ballots. In 1963, the EBRC adopted a rule allowing the numbers of voters in divisions to differ by no more than 20%, before increasing to 30% in 1980. It is the Cabinet's discretion to accept the Committee's recommendations.

=== Requirements of GRCs ===
All the candidates in a GRC must either be members of the same political party or independent candidates standing as a group, and at least one of the candidates must be a person belonging to the Malay, Indian or some other minority community. A person is regarded as belonging to the Malay community if, regardless of whether or not he or she is of the Malay race, considers himself or herself to be a member of the community and is generally accepted as such by the community. Similarly, a person will belong to the Indian community or some other minority community if he or she considers himself or herself a member and the community accepts him or her as such. The minority status of candidates is determined by two committees appointed by the president, the Malay Community Committee and the Indian and Other Minority Communities Committee. Decisions of these committees are final and conclusive, and may not be appealed against or called into question in any court.

The president, at the Cabinet's direction, declares the electoral divisions that are to be GRCs; the number of candidates, between three and six to stand for Parliament in each GRC; and whether the minority candidates in each GRC are to be from the Malay, Indian, or other minority communities. The number of GRCs in which at least one MP must be from the Malay community must be three-fifths of the total number of GRCs, and the number of MPs to be returned by all GRCs cannot be less than a quarter of the total number of MPs to be returned at a general election. For the 2025 general election, there were 15 SMCs and 18 GRCs.

The number of female candidates in a GRC team is not a requirement, and it is possible that the teams can comprise entirely male candidates, and while three women inside a team is possible, none have occurred so far, despite the fact that the women representation in Singapore Parliament grew over time. This requirement is confirmed by Lee Kuan Yew in one of an interview questions questioning about multiracial MPs inside a SMC.

=== Electoral system ===
An electoral division which is a GRC returns the number of MPs designated for the constituency by the president to serve in Parliament. A group of individuals standing together in a GRC is voted for as a team, and not as individual candidates. Regardless of number of divisions voted for, the winning team is elected via a general ticket winner-take-all system using a plurality voting method. In one notable case during the 2015 election, the Workers' Party retained Aljunied GRC by a narrow 1.9% margin or around 2,600 votes; an election recount revealed that WP had won three out of the five divisions by a difference of at least one thousand votes, while PAP won the remaining two divisions by hundreds of votes. The marginal victory further demonstrated the effects of how GRC teams are elected.

A by-election need not be held to fill a vacancy in any GRC triggered by the death or resignation of an MP, even if there are no other minority candidates in that GRC, or any other reason. A by-election is required only if all the MPs in a GRC vacate their Parliamentary seats. Assuming that such a situation does arise, the prime minister would be obliged to call a by-election within a reasonable time, unless he intends to call a general election in the near future.

== Assessment ==
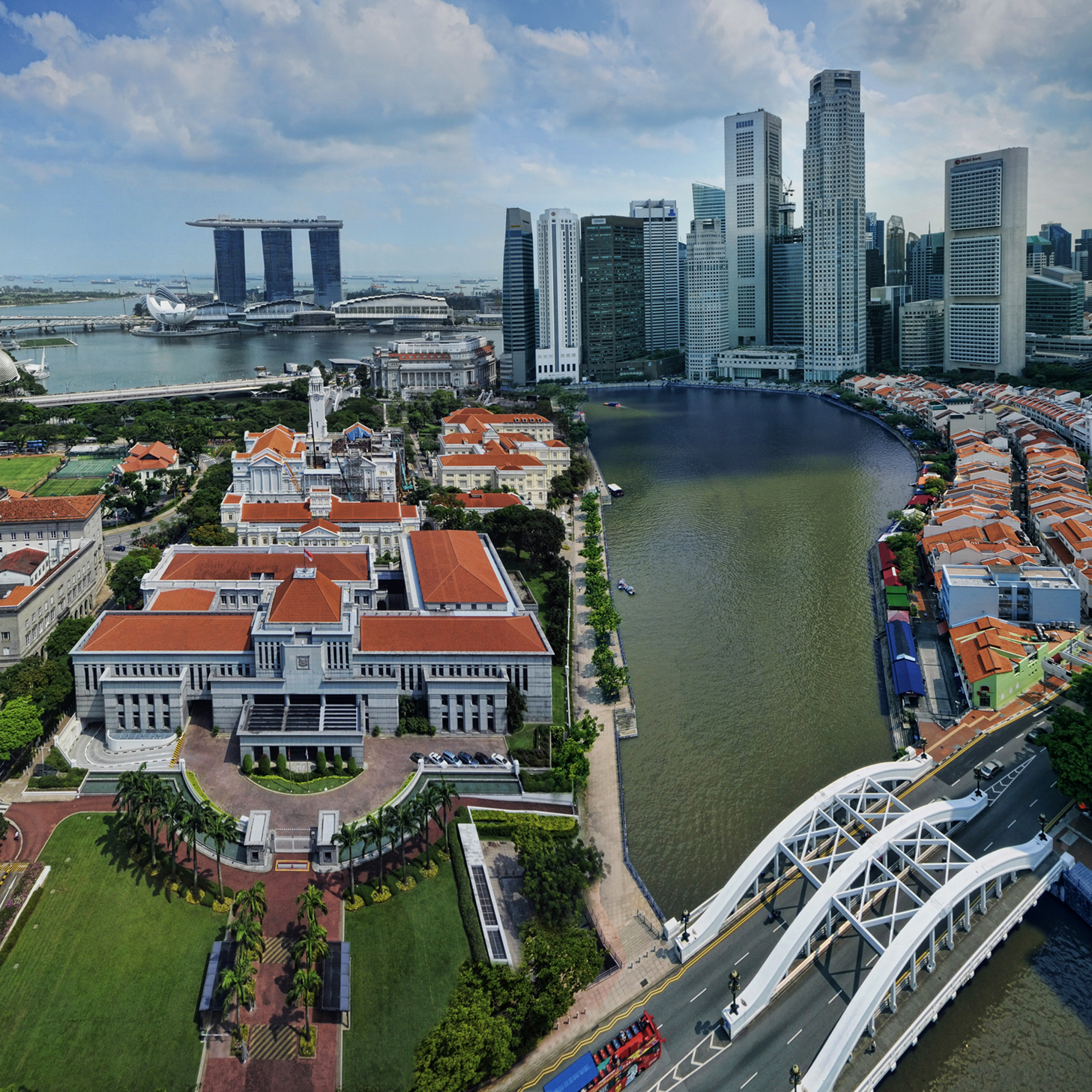
An aerial view of Parliament House (left, with semicircular driveway)

=== Advantages ===
As Article 39A of the Constitution states, the GRC scheme entrenches the presence of minority MPs in Parliament, ensuring that interests of minority communities are represented in Parliament. Article 39A(1)(a) of the Constitution allows for a maximum number of six MPs for each GRC so as to provide flexibility in ensuring that a GRC with a rapidly expanding population is properly managed. As the population of a constituency grows, it becomes increasingly difficult for an MP to singlehandedly represent the views of all constituents. A team of MPs arguably has greater access to more constituents, and the fact that there are different MPs in the team suggests they can more effectively provide representation in Parliament of a wide range of constituents' views.

=== Criticisms of the scheme ===
==== Diversion from original purpose ====
The official justification for the GRC scheme is to entrench minority representation in Parliament. However, opposition parties have questioned the usefulness of GRCs in fulfilling this purpose, especially since Singapore has not faced the issue of minorities being under-represented in Parliament. In fact, statistics show that all PAP minority candidates have won regularly and that the only two MPs to lose their seats in 1984 were ethnically Chinese. One of them was beaten by a minority candidate. In addition, Joshua Benjamin Jeyaratnam of the WP won a by-election in 1981 at Anson, a largely Chinese constituency, and the first elected Chief Minister of Singapore was David Marshall who was Jewish. Technically, as the size of GRCs has increased, the minority has had less representation overall as the proportion of minority MPs per GRC has been reduced, which further reduced their political clouting. There are only two such MPs in SMCs who are of ethnic minority since the GRC scheme was introduced, namely Michael Palmer (who was the MP-elect for Punggol East SMC until 2012) and Murali Pillai (who was the MP-elect for Bukit Batok SMC since 2016). Even with the scheme, no Malay opposition candidates had elected into Parliament until Faisal Manap becoming the first man to do so in 2011, but even so, only seven other ethnic minority opposition candidates have been elected to date since independence, of which five, all from the WP, were elected after the GRC's scheme was introduced.

In February 2017, Minister in the Prime Minister's Office Chan Chun Sing said that if a minority candidate leaves their group representation constituency (GRC), a by-election will not be called. Chan claimed that the goals of having enough minority members in Parliament, and to ensure no political campaign on issues of race and religion, would still be met even if the minority member of the GRC left.

The GRC scheme is also used as a recruiting tool for the PAP. In 2006, Goh Chok Tong stated, "Without some assurance of a good chance of winning at least their first election, many able and successful young Singaporeans may not risk their careers to join politics". Every PAP GRC team is helmed by a major figure such as a minister, and allowed candidates to ride on the coat-tails of the established PAP members. Since 1991, the PAP has generally not fielded first-time candidates in SMC wards. On the other hand, one of the "in-built weaknesses" of GRCs may be that "through no fault of their own or that of their team", "high-value" MPs can be voted out; this was said to have occurred when former Minister for Foreign Affairs George Yeo lost his parliamentary seat to a Workers' Party (WP) team in Aljunied GRC at the 2011 general election, and also Minister without portfolio and National Trades Union Congress secretary-general Ng Chee Meng who also lost to that same party in the brand-new Sengkang GRC at the 2020 general election, being the first time a newly-created constituency was captured by any opposition party, though Ng would later return to Parliament in 2025. The reasons of the gains are particularly attributed to the bellwethering and support of now-defunct constituencies: the Aljunied GRC comprise portions of both Eunos (Eunos and Kaki Bukit divisions) and Cheng San GRCs (those of southern Punggol and Hougang planning areas), where the WP were defeated narrowly on both constituencies in the ensuing elections; the Sengkang GRC include a former Punggol East SMC, where the WP briefly captured the SMC in a 2013 by-election before being unseated, also at a narrow margin, in the subsequent 2015 election.

It is also said that GRCs serve more as administrative tools than to ensure minority representation, and increased over time to adapt the economies of scale when managing the wards. However, whether GRCs are required for this purpose is arguable, as Goh Chok Tong stated in 1988 that MPs in SMCs could still group together after elections to enjoy economies of scale.

==== Ground identity ====
Double-barrelled names of each GRCs were first introduced in the 1997 election with the introductions of Bishan-Toa Payoh GRC and Kreta Ayer–Tanglin GRC, being the first to amalgamate the names of two divisions or relevant into a GRC, and this trend persist in the subsequent elections after the renaming of other existing GRCs: for example in 2001, Pasir Ris GRC was renamed to Pasir Ris–Punggol GRC before the GRC was split into Pasir Ris–Changi GRC and Punggol GRC in 2025. Holland–Bukit Panjang GRC was also created in 2001 before renaming to its permanent Holland–Bukit Timah GRC in 2006 in favour of the Bukit Panjang SMC. In 2011, Jalan Besar GRC was temporarily renamed to Moulmein–Kallang GRC in exchange of Kreta Ayer–Kim Seng (except a portion of Hong Lim) and Moulmein between Jalan Besar and the neighbouring Tanjong Pagar GRC, but these changes were reversed backed in 2015 due to the familiarity of the former GRC. In 2025, three GRCs had been renamed, with Jurong GRC, Marine Parade GRC and West Coast GRC being renamed to Jurong East–Bukit Batok GRC, Marine Parade–Braddell Heights GRC and West Coast–Jurong West GRC respectively. In all of these changes, ELD mentioned that this was to account for population shifts and identity purposes, though these changes also resulted in criticism as the renamed constituencies are treated like it was a new constituency instead as being an existing constituency, residents living in existing constituencies making no difference of the ward being changed alongside town council managements, as well as logistics from other opposition parties who marked their intention to contest in their constituencies they gained ground with. This was proved to be the case in the 2025 after the Marine Parade–Braddell Heights GRC went uncontested, subjecting to further mixed reactions.

Besides GRCs with double-barrelled names, only two other GRCs that was mentioned in-name in it does not contain a division sharing the division of the same name, as in this case of East Coast and Sengkang (Pasir Ris is an exception as it was once used as a division in Eunos GRC despite not being carved as a SMC). In the initial formation, only two GRCs that were once SMCs, Hong Kah and Tampines, which have been upgraded into GRCs in 1988, does not contain the namesake division.

==== Opposition parties disadvantaged ====
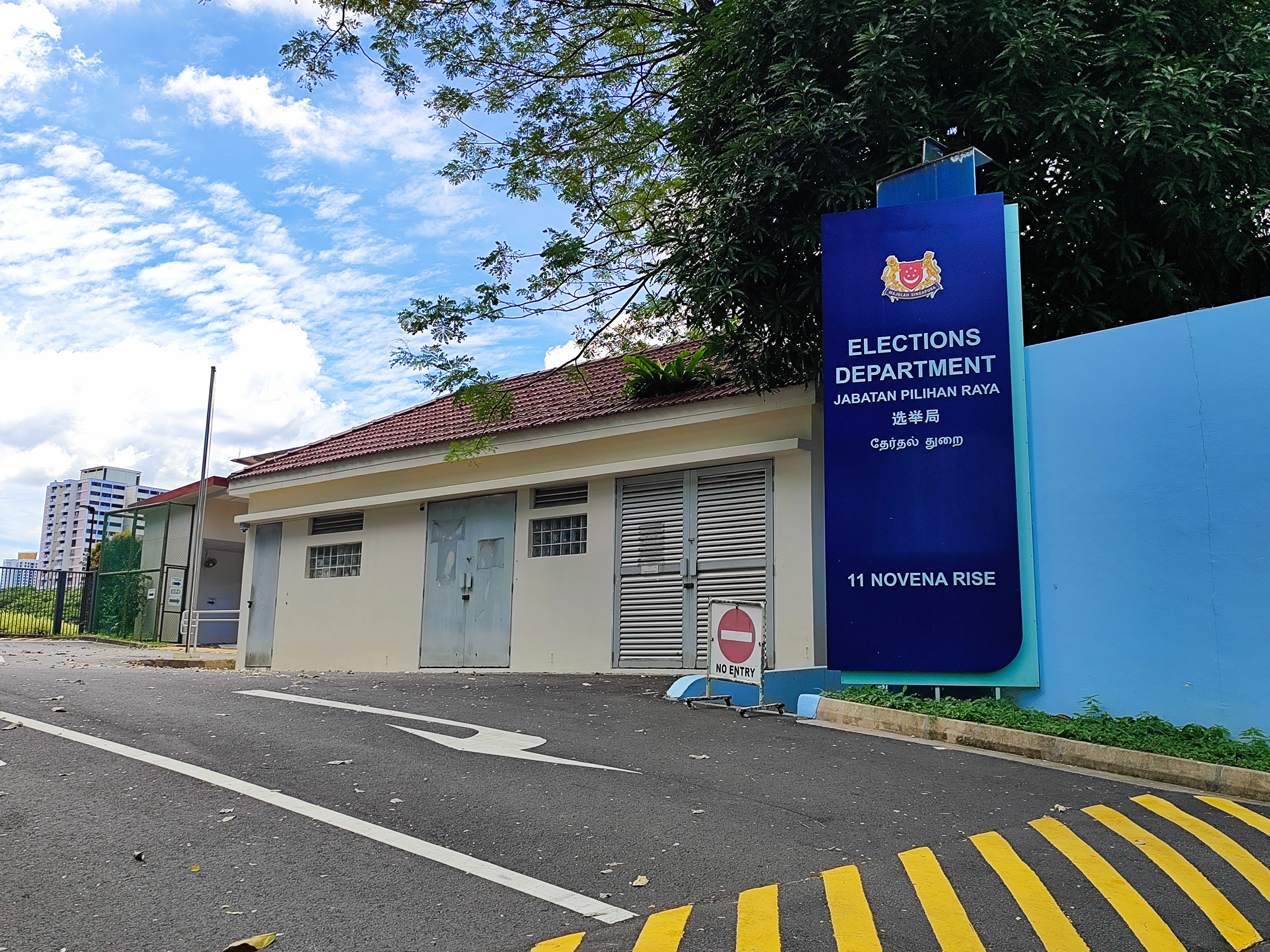
The Elections Department (building pictured) is responsible for managing the conduct of elections in Singapore.

The GRC scheme has also been criticized for raising the bar for the opposition in elections. First, opposition parties may find it harder to find competent candidates, including minority candidates, to form teams to contest GRCs. Goh Chok Tong has acknowledged that the GRC scheme benefits the PAP as they can put together stronger teams. With the GRC system the threshold for votes for the opposition is also increased, and opposition parties have to take a gamble and commit huge proportions of their resources to contest GRCs. Each candidate in a GRC is required to deposit a sum equal to 8% of the total allowances payable to an MP in the calendar year preceding the election, rounded to the nearest S$500; for such contests in GRCs, teams paid an amount multiplied by the number of candidates. Unsuccessful candidates have their deposits forfeited if they do not receive at least one-eighth of the total number of votes polled in the GRC. Critics have noted that the number of walkovers has generally increased since the introduction of GRCs, but the number have been reduced over the years, and oppositions were able to win GRCs beginning in 2011. Similarly, while multi-cornered contests are less than frequent, multi-cornered contests appears lesser in GRCs than those of single member constituencies, which only occurred on three different elections: its first instance was the 1992 Marine Parade by-election, where the Marine Parade GRC witnessed a four-way contest. The next such occurrence was in 2020, as Pasir Ris-Punggol GRC saw a three-way contest. 2025 had three GRCs with multi-cornered fights, namely Ang Mo Kio GRC, Sembawang GRC, and Tampines GRC. In all of these instances, PAP and one opposition party of more prominence perform better than those of parties of lesser prominence, leaving the latter parties losing their deposits.

==== Creation of unequal voting power ====
GRCs have been criticized as giving unequal voting and lobbying (correspondence) powers between electors. Every ballot in a GRC ward returns five or six candidates into Parliament, compared with one vote in a SMC ward, which only returns one. In counterbalance it dilutes electors' voting power and may result in concerns raised taken less seriously as to lobbying/correspondence. Specifically, in an SMC ward are around 14,000 voters, compared to 140,000 voters in a five- or six-member GRC. Thus, the per-candidate power of the ballot in a GRC is lower than in an SMC, as each voter in a GRC finds it harder to vote out an MP that he or she does not like; but the overall power effect is the same.

==== Electoral division re-drawings ====
Malapportionment is a viable charge against some divisions as a 30% deviation from equality of electorate is tolerated. It follows, a five-member GRC could in theory have from 91,000 voters to 86% more: 169,000 voters.

In 2024, Hazel Poa of the Progress Singapore Party called for GRCs to be abolished and for SMCs to represent 27,000 to 33,000 voters (10% from 30,000), arguing the current 20,000 to 38,000 voters per MP is too large a variation with some MPs having nearly twice the workload as others. Chan Chun Sing of the governing People's Action Party defended the current deviation on the basis that applying a 10% deviation on small electorates (with MPs in UK and Australia representing two to three times more voters) will mean more frequent and major changes to electoral boundaries as people move, and that more intimate representation with small electorates can balance a large percentage variation. Chan Chung Sing also added that even in established democracies, "no electoral system in the world can definitively claim that every vote is exactly the same or near equal".

==== Weakening of voter–MP relationship ====
Critics have noted that the credibility and accountability of some candidates may be reduced because in a GRC the members of the team who are popular "protect" less popular members from being voted out. It has been said that the relationship between the electorate and their representatives is also weakened, because the relationship is between the individual and the GRC team rather than between the individual and a particular MP. Improving the link between voters and MPs, and to make the latter more accountable was the reason for the changes proposed in 2009 to introduce more SMCs and to reduce the size of GRCs.

==== Enshrining of racialism ====
Even though the GRC scheme is intended to ensure minority representation in Parliament, it can be said that the scheme emphasizes racial consciousness and hence widens the gap between races. It may undermine the esteem of minority candidates as they would not be sure if they are elected on their own merit, or due to the scheme and the merits of the rest of the team of MPs. This would result in minority candidates resenting that they are dependent on the majority to enter Parliament, and the majority candidates believing that minority candidates have insufficient ability. It has also been claimed that the GRC scheme demeans the majority of Singaporeans as it assumes that they are not able to see the value or merit of minority candidates, and only vote for candidates with whom they share a common race, culture and language. In a CNA interview on 27 October 2026 with former Senior Minister of Singapore S Jayakumar, who launched his book "Creating Three Unique Singapore Laws: An Inside Story", noted the strong importance of the minority safeguards applying to the GRC teams, citing the rise of the "racial undercurrents" in the present day.

==== Law of large numbers ====
Derek da Cunha has proposed that the law of large numbers favours the GRC system. According to the theory, the large number of voters from GRC wards generally, though not necessarily always, reflects the popular vote. Traditionally, the gap was an average between 3% and 5% in early days, but the gap has since increased to between 7% and 10% in later elections due to less walkovers; similarly, the combined average for GRCs was higher than the national average compared to SMCs, but however the results fluctated in later elections for the same reason. Despite this average, the top scoring constituencies in each election until 2015 were all SMCs, and in 2015, Jurong GRC became the first GRC to top the charts. This may be attributable to the enlargement of the size of GRCs in 1997 which gave greater effect to the law of large numbers.

==== Women representation ====
On 28 April 2006, Lee Kuan Yew brought this fact that there are no prerequisite on having women representation in terms on representing teams fielding in GRCs, after noted that the contests in all nine SMCs at the time of the 2006 election are all ethnic Chinese men. Despite this, the representation of women in Singaporean parliament steadily increased in each succeeding elections and GRCs had between zero and two women MPs fielded; there are no teams who have fielded three or more women to date.

== See also ==
- Constituencies of Singapore
- Directorial system
- Gerrymandering
- General ticket (of which the system used for GRCs is a modified version)
- List of electoral divisions and wards in Singapore
- Non-constituency Member of Parliament
- Presidential Council for Minority Rights
