= Lee Li Lian =

Singaporean politician (born 1978)

- 李丽连

Member of Parliament for Punggol East SMC
- In office 26 January 2013 – 11 September 2015
- Preceded by: Michael Palmer (PAP)
- Succeeded by: Charles Chong (PAP)

Personal details
- Born: 19 July 1978 (age 48) Singapore
- Party: Workers' Party
- Spouse: Koh Chee Koon
- Children: 2
- Education: Curtin University
- Occupation: Politician

Lee Li Lian (Chinese: 李丽连; pinyin: Lǐ Lìlián; born 19 July 1978) is a Singaporean politician. A member of the Workers' Party (WP), she was the Member of Parliament for Punggol East Single Member Constituency (SMC) between 2013 and 2015.

Lee made her political debut in the 2011 general election, unsuccessfully contesting in Punggol East SMC against the governing People's Action Party (PAP). She later became its Member of Parliament (MP) after winning the 2013 by-election; however, she was narrowly unseated by the PAP in the 2015 general election.

== Career ==
Outside politics, Lee worked as a Business Development Executive at Clapper (S) Pte Ltd (2000–2003), a Financial Consultant for American International Assurance (2003–2005), a Broker with CIMB-GK Securities (2005–2006), a Recruitment Manager for Prudential Assurance (2006–2008) and a Senior Trainer at Great Eastern Life Assurance (2008–2013). Lee resigned from her job as a financial trainer to serve as a full-time MP following her victory in the Punggol East by-election.

=== Political career ===
Lee was part of the executive council of WP's Youth Wing and became its organising secretary in 2006.

She was later elected into the WP's Central Executive Committee and served as the Deputy Treasurer from 2008 to 2011, Youth Wing President from 2011 to 2012 and the Deputy Webmaster from 2012 to 2014.

Lee made her political debut on the 2011 general election when she was fielded as a candidate in Punggol East SMC, formerly part of the neighbouring Pasir Ris–Punggol Group Representation Constituency (GRC). She faced Michael Palmer, PAP candidate and incumbent MP for the Punggol East division in Pasir Ris–Punggol GRC, as well as Desmond Lim, chairperson of the Singapore Democratic Alliance (SDA), in a three-way contest for the SMC. Lee garnered 41.01% of the vote, losing to Palmer, who obtained 54.54%. Lim lost his deposit after receiving 4.45% of the vote, below the 12.5% required for deposit retention. After the election, Lee served as a legislative assistant to Pritam Singh, one of the WP MPs for Aljunied GRC.

On 12 December 2012, Palmer resigned as Speaker of Parliament and MP for Punggol East SMC after confessing that he had had an extra-marital affair with Laura Ong, the Constituency Director of the People's Association (PA) office in the Pasir Ris West division of Pasir Ris–Punggol GRC. This precipitated a by-election which would be held in January 2013. On 14 January 2013, the WP announced Lee's candidacy for the by-election.

On 16 January, after nominations for the by-election had closed, a rare four-way contest was announced between Lee, Lim, PAP candidate Koh Poh Koon, a colorectal surgeon who had joined the party three months prior, and a fourth candidate, Kenneth Jeyaretnam, the secretary-general of the Reform Party (RP). On Polling Day, 26 January, Lee won the election with 54.50% of the vote. Koh, Jeyaretnam and Lim respectively received 43.73%, 1.2% and 0.57%. This win marked the second time the opposition had flipped a seat in Parliament at a by-election, after the 1981 Anson by-election; Lee was also the first female opposition candidate to win an SMC. Upon her win, Lee told the media that her immediate priority as MP for the SMC would be to ensure the smooth handover of town council operations from the PAP. She was sworn into Parliament on 4 February 2013.

During the 2015 general election, the PAP fielded Charles Chong, Deputy Speaker of Parliament, to unseat Lee, who was defeated with 48.24% of the vote. By virtue of her electoral performance, she was offered a non-constituency MP (NCMP) position with her electoral performance; however, she declined it, a situation last seen in 1984. In 2016, Daniel Goh, a 2015 WP candidate for East Coast GRC, was nominated by a parliamentary vote to fill Lee's vacant NCMP seat.

After the 2020 general election, Lee was appointed a councillor for Sengkang Town Council, covering Sengkang GRC, which had been newly won by the WP.

== Education ==
Lee attended Holy Innocents' High School and Ngee Ann Polytechnic before graduating from Curtin University in 2001.

== Personal life ==
Lee is married to Koh Chee Koon, a telecommunications consultant. On 15 January 2014, it was announced that she was pregnant with her first child; she gave birth to a girl on 1 July.
