= Charles Chong =

Singaporean politician (born 1953)

- 张有福
- Chong in 2017

Speaker of the Parliament of Singapore
- Acting
- In office 7 August 2017 – 11 September 2017
- Prime Minister: Lee Hsien Loong
- Preceded by: Halimah Yacob
- Succeeded by: Tan Chuan-Jin

Deputy Speaker of the Parliament of Singapore
- In office 17 October 2011 – 23 June 2020 Serving with Lim Biow Chuan (2016-2020), Seah Kian Peng (2011-2016)
- Speaker: Michael Palmer; Halimah Yacob; Tan Chuan-Jin
- Preceded by: Indranee Rajah
- Succeeded by: Christopher de Souza; Jessica Tan

Member of the Singapore Parliament for Punggol East SMC
- In office 11 September 2015 – 23 June 2020
- Preceded by: Lee Li Lian
- Succeeded by: Constituency abolished
- Majority: 1,156 (3.52%)

Member of the Singapore Parliament for Joo Chiat SMC
- In office 7 May 2011 – 25 August 2015
- Preceded by: Chan Soo Sen
- Succeeded by: Edwin Tong
- Majority: 388 (2.02%)

Member of the Singapore Parliament for Pasir Ris–Punggol GRC (Punggol Central)
- In office 25 October 2001 – 19 April 2011
- Preceded by: Michael Lim Chun Leng
- Succeeded by: Teo Ser Luck
- Majority: 61,704 (37.40%)

Member of the Singapore Parliament for Pasir Ris GRC (Pasir Ris Elias)
- In office 2 January 1997 – 18 October 2001
- Preceded by: Constituency established
- Succeeded by: Teo Chee Hean
- Majority: 33,503 (41.80%)

Member of the Singapore Parliament for Eunos GRC (Pasir Ris)
- In office 31 August 1991 – 16 December 1996
- Preceded by: Teo Choong Tee
- Succeeded by: Teo Chee Hean
- Majority: 4,160 (4.76%)

Member of the Singapore Parliament for Sembawang GRC (Nee Soon East)
- In office 3 September 1988 – 14 August 1991
- Preceded by: Constituency established
- Succeeded by: Ho Peng Kee
- Majority: 20,718 (40.20%)

Personal details
- Born: Charles Chong You Fook; 24 June 1953 (age 73) Colony of Singapore
- Party: People's Action Party
- Education: Sydney Technical College

Charles Chong You Fook (Note: Chinese: 张有福; Pha̍k-fa-sṳ: Chông Yû-fuk; pinyin: Zhāng Yǒufú) (born 24 June 1953) is a Singaporean former politician who served as Deputy Speaker of the Parliament of Singapore between 2011 and 2020. He served as Acting Speaker of the Parliament of Singapore from 7 August to 11 September 2017, following the resignation of Halimah Yacob on 7 August 2017.

== Education ==
Chong was educated at St. Michael's School and Saint Joseph's Institution before enrolling into Sydney Technical College to study aircraft engineering.

== Political career ==
Chong represented Sembawang Group Representation Constituency (GRC) in Yishun East from 1988 to 1991, Eunos GRC between 1991 and 1996 in Pasir Ris, Pasir Ris GRC in Elias from 1997 to 2001, Pasir Ris–Punggol GRC in Punggol Central from 2001 to 2011, Joo Chiat Single Member Constituency (SMC) from 2011 to 2015, and Punggol East SMC from 2015 to 2020.

In the 2006 general elections, the PAP contested Pasir Ris–Punggol GRC against the Singapore Democratic Alliance. The PAP won with 68.70% of the votes in this GRC. In the 2001 general elections, the GRC was not contested and resulted in a walkover for Chong and his party in this GRC.

Chong contested the Joo Chiat SMC in the 2011 general elections after its incumbent MP, Chan Soo Sen, retired from politics. He won 9,666 or 51.02% of the votes against Yee Jenn Jong from the Workers' Party (WP). Chong was elected Deputy Speaker in the 12th Parliament.

In the 2015 general elections, the PAP fielded Chong in the opposition-held Punggol East SMC. Just before Cooling-off Day, Chong had distributed flyers alleging that the Workers' Party had "lost" $22.5 million of town council funds. In response, WP issued a statement refuting the claim. Chong went on to unseat the incumbent Lee Li Lian of the Workers' Party with 51.76% of the vote. In the aftermath of the elections, Png Eng Huat, vice-chairman of WP, asked Chong about the missing money and Png said that Chong replied that he had explained but there was no explanation given. In February 2018, Png in a Facebook post, said Aljunied Hougang Town Council (AHTC which had managed Punggol East SMC from 2013 to 2015) had resolved all its accounting lapses and $22.8 million to $26.3 million attributed to Punggol East was in each of its financial statements since 2013. Pasir Ris-Punggol Town Council also had an unqualified financial statement for the 2016/2017 financial year which meant "there was no such missing money else the accounts would be qualified". While being interviewed by The Straits Times, Chong said the AHTC's financial statements were all qualified by their own auditors and questioned about an ongoing court case by AHTC against its town councillors

In December 2016, Chong had a liver transplant and his duty was covered by Teo Chee Hean during his absence.

On 11 January 2018, Chong was appointed chairman of the Select Committee on Deliberate Online Falsehoods.

He is the longest serving PAP back-bencher in Parliament and served as Deputy Speaker of Parliament of Singapore, as well as Acting Speaker when Halimah Yacob quit Parliament to stand for elected presidency.

On 27 June 2020, Chong announced his retirement from politics.

In September 2020, Chong, in an interview to The Straits Times, said he proposed to the PAP leadership, prior to the 2015 elections, to form a team of veteran PAP MPs, "a few of the non-conformist sort", to contest Aljunied GRC to help the PAP win back the GRC, citing the citizens there voted for opposition and "they don't want pro-establishment people.". Chong also said there was enough room for debate within PAP and changes can be made from within in private. If there are rebukes in public, the party would circle the wagons and blocked critics.

== Personal life ==
Chong is married and has two children. He is a Roman Catholic.

In December 2016, Chong announced he was diagnosed with non-alcoholic steatohepatitis three years ago and had a liver transplant on 1 December 2016, which his younger son Glenn, donated part of his liver.

== Notes ==
Parliament of Singapore
New constituency	Member of Parliament for Sembawang GRC (Nee Soon East); 1988 – 1991	Succeeded by Ho Peng Kee
New constituency	Member of Parliament for Eunos GRC (Pasir Ris); 1991 – 1997	Constituency abolished
New constituency	Member of Parliament for Pasir Ris GRC (Pasir Ris Elias); 1997 – 2001	Constituency abolished
New constituency	Member of Parliament for Pasir Ris–Punggol GRC (Punggol South); 2001 – 2006	Succeeded by Teo Ser Luck
Preceded by Michael Lim	Member of Parliament for Pasir Ris–Punggol GRC (Punggol Central); 2006 – 2011	Succeeded by Teo Ser Luck
Preceded by Chan Soo Sen	Member of Parliament for Joo Chiat SMC; 2011 – 2015	Succeeded by Edwin Tong as MP for Marine Parade GRC (Joo Chiat)
Preceded by Lee Li Lian	Member of Parliament for Punggol East SMC; 2015 – 2020	Succeeded by Louis Chua and He Ting Ru as MPs for Sengkang GRC (Rivervale) and (Buangkok)
