= Reform Party (Singapore) =

Singaporean political party

The Reform Party: Parti Reformasi (Malay); 革新党 (Chinese); Géxīn Dǎng; சீர்திருத்தக் கட்சி (Tamil); Cīrtiruttak Kaṭci
- Abbreviation: RP
- Chairman: Mahaboob Batcha
- Secretary-General: Vacant
- Founder: Joshua Benjamin Jeyaretnam
- Founded: 3 July 2008; 18 years ago
- Split from: The Workers' Party
- Headquarters: 18A Smith Street; Singapore 058932
- Newspaper: The New Dawn
- Youth wing: Young Reformers
- Ideology: Liberal democracy
- Political position: Centre
- Colours: Yellow
- Parliament: 0 / 99
- Town Councils: 0 / 19

The Reform Party (RP) is a political party in Singapore. According to its constitution, the party seeks to promote "political, social and economic reform; restoration of full human rights; a fairer and just distribution of wealth with the elimination of poverty; an independently appointed judiciary; and a fully elected and sovereign parliament". Its philosophy states that "That every member of the society is born with fundamental rights which cannot be abrogated... and that it is the paramount duty of the society to promote the human dignity of its every single member." Since 2020, the party has embarked on a green manifesto.

RP was founded by opposition veteran and lawyer J. B. Jeyaretnam, former Secretary-General of the Workers' Party (WP) and the first opposition candidate in post-independence Singapore, on 3 July 2008. Around three months after the party's foundation, J.B. Jeyaretnam died on 30 September, and the leadership was taken over by his son, Kenneth Jeyaretnam, who would serve as Secretary-General till his death on 18 July 2026.

== History ==
=== Founding and change in leadership ===
RP was founded by lawyer and veteran politician J.B. Jeyaretnam in 2008. Formerly from WP, J.B. Jeyaretnam (then a Non-Constituency Member of Parliament) was sued by Senior Minister Lee Kuan Yew, Prime Minister Goh Chok Tong and Tamil PAP MPs on defamation charges, and had to pay about S$1.5 million to his opponents. In 2001, he was declared bankrupt after incurring a debt of more than S$600,000 (which also barred the right to stand for elections, or represent as member of parliament). He subsequently resigned from WP, citing that the party had failed to support him with the payment. In May 2007, J.B. Jeyaretnam was discharged from bankruptcy and in September, reinstated to the bar. He would go on to register and form RP on 3 July 2008, where he became the pro-tem Secretary-General.

On 30 September, around three months after founding RP, J.B. Jeyaretnam died following a heart attack, and over a thousand people attended his funeral. K. Jeyaretnam, who at the time, was residing with his family in the United Kingdom, and had never participated in politics, took over as secretary-general in April 2009.

=== First election and by-election ===
On 8 May 2010, the party announced six candidates to contest the 2011 general election, which included K. Jeyaretnam. However, several members who joined the party subsequently resigned to join other parties, including Jeannette Chong-Aruldoss, Tony Tan Lay Thiam and wife Hazel Poa, and Nicole Seah. Earlier on, the party was invited by Chiam See Tong to join the Singapore Democratic Alliance (SDA) with RP setting out 11 conditions to join the SDA. However, the rest of the leadership of SDA voted not to make a decision on the list of conditions, and the discussion was leaked to the press. As a result, K. Jeyaretnam decided against RP joining the SDA.

During the 2011 general election, RP fielded two teams to contest West Coast and Ang Mo Kio GRCs, which were led respectively by Minister of Trade & Industry Lim Hng Kiang and Prime Minister Lee Hsien Loong, both of the People's Action Party (PAP). In his first campaign speech in late April 2011, K. Jeyaretnam said that competition in politics would lead to better and more intelligent policies for Singapore. He also noted that the ruling People's Action Party (PAP) would likely open the floodgates to more foreigners to enter Singapore again once they formed the next government. However, RP's electoral debut was unable to bear fruit, as RP lost both contests to the PAP, with a combined vote share of less than 35%. More members subsequently left the party.

A by-election in Punggol East SMC was held on 26 January 2013 after the resignation of speaker Michael Palmer on 12 December 2012. K. Jeyaretnam participated in the by-election, but was defeated by WP's Lee Li Lian in a rare four-cornered contest. K. Jeyaretnam forfeited his S$14,500 election deposit as he garnered only 1.2% of the valid votes cast (per electoral rules, the threshold of retaining the deposit is 12.5%, or one-eighth, of the valid votes cast for the constituency).

=== Further electoral defeats and leadership changes ===
During the 2015 general election, RP fielded 11 candidates to contest three constituencies, Ang Mo Kio and West Coast GRCs, as well as Radin Mas SMC, a ward that used to be part of J.B. Jeyaretnam's former Anson constituency. The election also marked the debut of activists Roy Ngerng and M Ravi. On 7 September, RP released its manifesto. On 11 September, following the general election, RP found their electoral performance dwindled, compared to the last election, as they garnered only 20.60% of vote share in the three constituencies. This was mostly attributed to the large swing from the opposition to the ruling party, seen in the 2015 general election.

In 2018, RP with six political parties (People's Power Party (PPP), Singaporeans First (SF), Singapore Democratic Party (SDP), Democratic Progressive Party (DPP), National Solidarity Party (NSP), and Peoples Voice Party (PV), held a meeting, that was led by former PAP MP Tan Cheng Bock, to discuss the formation of a coalition for the next election.

During the 2020 general election, RP fielded six candidates in two constituencies, Ang Mo Kio GRC and Radin Mas SMC. Breaking with tradition, the party chose not to contest West Coast GRC, to avoid a three-corner fight with Progress Singapore Party, a new party led by Tan Cheng Bock. Initially intending to contest Yio Chu Kang SMC, RP alleged that PSP had failed to abide by an agreement that RP would cede West Coast GRC to PSP while PSP would refrain from contesting Yio Chu Kang SMC. In response, the PSP rebutted that no such agreement existed. During the campaigning period, K. Jeyaretnam did not participate in the campaigning activities nor turn up for televised broadcasts as he was serving a mandatory 14-day Stay Home Notice after a visit to the United Kingdom. On 10 July, the party won neither constituency, with returning vote shares of 28.09% and 25.97% respectively. RP improved their party's vote share by 27.84% from the last election.

On 5 August, K. Jeyaretnam removed chairman Andy Zhu and treasurer Noraini Yunus from the CEC, and replaced them with CEC member Charles Yeo and deputy treasurer Mahaboob Baatsha, respectively. Several members subsequently left the party and followed Zhu and Noraini to form the Singapore United Party.

=== PAR membership and subsequent withdrawal ===
On 15 January 2022, Yeo temporarily relinquished his chairmanship of the party due to his arrest over alleged offences of criminal breach of trust and forgery in the course of his work. In June 2023, the RP, along with DPP, PV and PPP, formed the People's Alliance for Reform (PAR).

K. Jeyaretnam did not participate in the 2025 general election. Instead, RP had one candidate, Mahaboob Baatsha, who contested Queenstown SMC. Baatsha received 18.88% of the vote against incumbent PAP MP Eric Chua who received 81.12% of the vote. In July 2025, RP would withdraw from the PAR.

On 18 July 2026, K. Jeyaretnam passed away, leaving the future of RP in doubt.

== Objectives ==
RP's objectives, as espoused in its constitution are summarised as follows:

- Establish an elected and sovereign government whose Cabinet acts under the law and is checked by Parliament
- Appoint an independent Judiciary
- Secure political, social and economic rights of citizens
- Effect a fair wealth distribution and eliminate poverty

== Organisation ==
RP is unique among the political parties in Singapore, both government and opposition, in that its party structure does not follow a cadre based system of political organisation. The party constitution states that the Party Conference is the supreme governing authority.

== Leadership ==
=== List of secretaries-general ===
No	Name	Years
1	J. B. Jeyaretnam	2008–2009
2	Kenneth Jeyaretnam	2009–2026

=== Central Executive Committee ===
Title	Name
Chairperson	Mahaboob Batsha
President of Youth Wing	Khair Anaqi

== Electoral performance ==
=== Parliament ===
Election	Leader	Votes	%	Seats					NCMPs	Position	Result
Election	Leader	Votes	%	Contested			Total	+/–	NCMPs	Position	Result
Election	Leader	Votes	%	Seats	Won	Lost	Total	+/–	NCMPs	Position	Result
2011	Kenneth Jeyaretnam	86,294	4.28%	11	0	11	0 / 87	Steady	0 / 3	▲5th	No seats
2015	Kenneth Jeyaretnam	59,517	2.63%	11	0	11	0 / 89	Steady	0 / 3	Steady	No seats
2020	Kenneth Jeyaretnam	54,599	2.19%	6	0	6	0 / 93	Steady	0 / 2	▼7th	No seats

==== Seats contested ====
Election	Constituencies contested	Contested vote %	+/–
2011	6-member GRC: Ang Mo Kio; 5-member GRC: West Coast;	31.8%	—N/a
2015	6-member GRC: Ang Mo Kio; 4-member GRC: West Coast; SMC: Radin Mas	20.6%	▼11.2%
2020	5-member GRC: Ang Mo Kio; SMC: Radin Mas	27.8%	▲7.2%

=== By-election ===
Election	Leader	Constituency contested	Votes	%	Seats				Result
Election	Leader	Constituency contested	Votes	%	Contested		Total	+/–	Result
Election	Leader	Constituency contested	Votes	%	Won	Lost	Total	+/–	Result
2013	Kenneth Jeyaretnam	Punggol East SMC^{1}	353	1.2%	0	1	0 / 1	Steady	Lost

1. : Loss of candidate election deposit(s) in contested seat(s)
