= Punggol East Single Member Constituency =

Former electoral division in Singapore

Coordinates: 1.387°N 103.905°E

Punggol East
- Former single-member constituency for the Parliament of Singapore
- Region: North-East Region, Singapore
- Electorate: 35,436

Former constituency
- Created: 2011; 15 years ago
- Abolished: 2020; 6 years ago
- Seats: 1
- Member: Constituency abolished
- Town Council: Pasir Ris–Punggol (2011–2013, 2015–2020); Aljunied–Hougang–Punggol East (2013–2015)
- Created from: Pasir Ris–Punggol GRC
- Replaced by: Sengkang GRC

The Punggol East Single Member Constituency was a single member constituency (SMC) located in the north-eastern area of Singapore. At abolition, it was managed by Pasir Ris–Punggol Town Council.

== History ==
In February 2011, ahead of the 2011 general election, Punggol East SMC was carved out of Pasir Ris–Punggol Group Representation Constituency (GRC), which it had previously belonged to as a division.

Punggol East SMC was the sole constituency to feature a three-cornered contest for the 2011 election. The election was won by Michael Palmer, the incumbent MP for the Punggol East division of Pasir Ris–Punggol GRC, with 54.54% of the vote, defeating newcomer Lee Li Lian from the Workers' Party (WP), as well as Desmond Lim, secretary-general of the Singapore Democratic Alliance (SDA), who respectively garnered 41.01% and 4.45% of the vote. Lim forfeited his election deposit for not winning at least 12.5% of the vote.

Palmer resigned in December 2012 after having his extramarital affair exposed, with the SMC being placed in the care of Teo Ser Luck, Member of Parliament (MP) for the Punggol Central division in Pasir Ris–Punggol GRC. On 9 January 2013, it was announced that a by-election for the SMC was to be held on 26 January. The next day, the PAP unveiled their candidate for the by-election, Koh Poh Koon, while both Lee and Lim returned to contest for their respective parties. The election also featured a fourth candidate, Kenneth Jeyaretnam, secretary-general of the Reform Party (RP).

There were two rallies in this by-election. WP's rally drew the largest audience, amounting to between 5,000 and 12,000 viewers, while SDA used social media and technology to draw audiences via a series of videos posted to YouTube.

During the vote counting, Lim officially conceded defeat. He and Jeyaretnam both lost their election deposits in this by-election, having respectively won 0.57% and 1.2% of the vote. At 0.57%, Lim also set a record for the lowest percentage of the vote garnered in an election in post-independence Singapore.

Lee gained the seat for the WP with 16,038 local votes, or 54.52% (16,045 votes or 54.5% after the tabulation of overseas votes), marking the second gain made by the opposition from the PAP in a by-election. She was sworn into Parliament on 4 February 2013, and held her first Meet-The-People session (MPS) on the same day. After her victory, the SMC was managed by the WP-held Aljunied–Hougang Town Council (AHTC), which was renamed Aljunied–Hougang–Punggol East Town Council (AHPETC).

In the 2015 general election, the PAP fielded Charles Chong against incumbent Lee. Just before Cooling-off Day, Chong distributed flyers alleging that the WP had "lost" $22.5 million of town council funds. In response, the WP issued a statement refuting the claim. Chong won with 51.76% of the vote in a straight fight. Lee was offered the first of three Non-Constituency MP (NCMP) seats by virtue of her electoral performance but rejected it, a situation last seen in 1984.

In the aftermath of the elections, Png Eng Huat, vice-chairman of WP, asked Chong about the missing money, later claiming that Chong replied that he had explained without having actually given an explanation. In February 2018, Png stated in a Facebook post that AHTC, having reverted from AHPETC, had resolved all of its accounting lapses, with $22.8 million to $26.3 million attributed to Punggol East SMC in every of its financial statements since 2013. Pasir Ris–Punggol Town Council also had an unqualified financial statement for the 2016/2017 financial year which "[meant] there was no such missing money [or else] the accounts would be qualified". When interviewed by The Straits Times, Chong refuted, stating that AHTC's financial statements were all qualified by its own auditors while questioning about an ongoing court case by AHTC against its town councillors.

Prior to the 2020 general election, the SMC was absorbed into Sengkang GRC after the Electoral Boundaries Review Committee (EBRC) released its report on 13 March 2020.

== Member of Parliament ==
Election	Member	Party
Formation
2011	Michael Palmer	PAP
2013	Lee Li Lian	WP
2015	Charles Chong	PAP
Constituency abolished (2020)

== Electoral results ==
Note: The Elections Department does not include rejected votes when calculating the vote shares of candidates. Hence, all candidates' vote shares will total to 100% at any given election (may not appear so in multi-way contests due to rounding).

=== Elections in 2010s ===
General Election 2011: Punggol East
Party	Candidate	Votes	%
PAP	Michael Palmer	16,994	54.54
WP	Lee Li Lian	12,777	41.01
SDA	Desmond Lim	1,387	4.45
Majority		3,170	10.77
Registered electors		31,158	
Turnout		31,709	95.3
PAP win (new seat)			

By-Election 2013: Punggol East
Party	Candidate	Votes	%	±%
WP	Lee Li Lian	16,045	54.50	▲13.49
PAP	Koh Poh Koon	12,875	43.73	▼10.81
RP	Kenneth Jeyaretnam	353	1.20	N/A
SDA	Desmond Lim	168	0.57	▼3.88
Majority		3,170	10.77	▼2.76
Registered electors		31,659		▼4.9
Rejected ballots		418	1.40	▼0.3
Turnout		29,859	94.31	−0.99
WP gain from PAP		Swing	▲13.49	

General Election 2015: Punggol East
Party	Candidate	Votes	%	±%
PAP	Charles Chong	16,957	51.76	▲8.03
WP	Lee Li Lian	15,801	48.24	▼6.26
Majority		1,156	3.52	
Registered electors		34,466		
Rejected ballots		379	1.14	▼0.26
Turnout		33,137	96.14	▲1.83
PAP gain from WP		Swing	▲8.03	
