= Kenneth Jeyaretnam =

Singaporean politician (1959–2026)

- கென்னத் ஜெயரத்தினம்
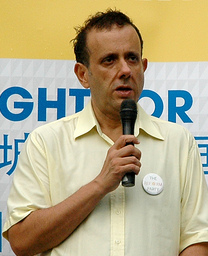
- Jeyaretnam speaking in 2011

2nd Secretary-General of Reform Party
- In office 10 April 2009 – 18 July 2026
- Preceded by: J.B. Jeyaretnam; Ng Teck Siong (acting SG following death of founder JB Jeyaretnam)
- Succeeded by: TBA

Personal details
- Born: Kenneth Andrew Jeyaretnam; 6 March 1959 Colony of Singapore
- Died: 18 July 2026 (aged 67) London, United Kingdom
- Other political affiliations: Reform Party (2009–2026)
- Spouse: Amanda Jeyaretnam (m. 1995)
- Children: 1
- Parent: J. B. Jeyaretnam (father)
- Relatives: Philip Jeyaretnam (brother)
- Education: Queens' College, Cambridge; Amsterdam Institute of Finance
- Occupation: Politician; hedge fund manager

Kenneth Andrew Jeyaretnam (Note: Tamil: கென்னத் ஆண்ட்ரூ ஜெயரத்தினம், romanized: Keṉṉat Āṇṭrū Jeyarattiṉam) (6 March 1959 – 18 July 2026) was a Singaporean politician and hedge fund manager who served as the secretary-general of the Reform Party from 2009 until his death in 2026. Jeyaretnam was the elder son of J. B. Jeyaretnam, a prominent opposition politician in Singapore who founded the Reform Party in 2008. He received a double first in economics from Cambridge, and started his career in the financial sector. He worked at Wardley, Continental Bank, Banque Indosuez and Nomura International before becoming a hedge fund manager. Jeyaretnam took up a more active role in politics after his father's death in 2008 and started leading the RP. He contested the 2011 general election, the 2013 Punggol East by-election, and the 2015 and 2020 general elections, and lost all of them.

== Early life and education ==
Jeyaretnam was born in Singapore on 6 March 1959. His parents, Joshua Benjamin Jeyaretnam and Margaret Cynthia Walker, were both lawyers by profession. His father was a prominent opposition politician in Singapore and the first elected opposition Member of Parliament since Singapore gained independence in 1965.

He was educated at St. Andrew's School and the United World College of South East Asia in Singapore before he attended Charterhouse School in England from 1975 to 1977. Between 1977 and 1980, he returned to Singapore for National Service, and then went on to study economics at Queens' College, University of Cambridge, from which he graduated with double first class honours in 1983. He also studied at the Amsterdam Institute of Finance.

== Finance career ==
After graduating from Cambridge in 1983, Jeyaretnam applied to work at the Monetary Authority of Singapore and other financial institutions and banks, but his applications were turned down. Nevertheless, he managed to start a career in the financial sector as an assistant manager in the Lending Department of Wardley, the merchant banking arm of HSBC. He worked at Continental Bank, Banque Indosuez and Nomura International before he became a hedge fund manager focusing on event-driven investing. From 2004 to 2008, he established and managed his own funds. When he was working in London, he was a committee member of the Singapore UK Association.

== Political career ==
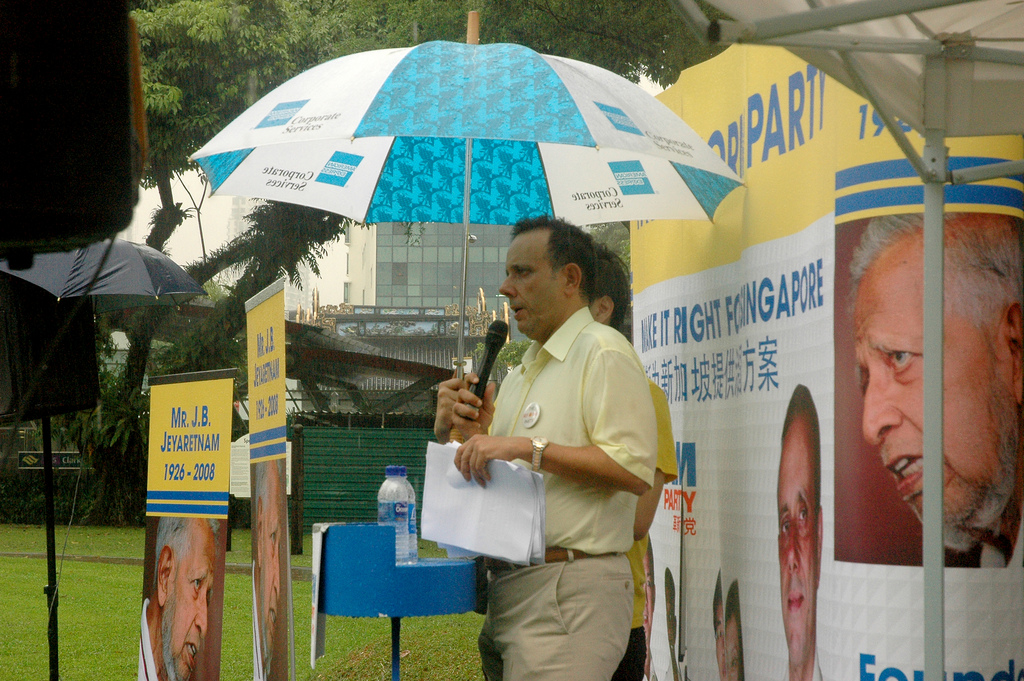
Jeyaretnam speaking at a RP rally at the Speakers' Corner in 2011

Following his father's death in September 2008, Jeyaretnam took up a more active role in politics. In April 2009, he became the Secretary-General of the opposition Reform Party (RP), founded by his father in 2008 months before his death, after being elected to office by reform party CEC following vote of no confidence in acting SG.

=== 2011 general election ===
Jeyaretnam first stood for elections in the 2011 general election when he led a five-member RP team to contest the West Coast GRC against a five-member team from the governing People's Action Party (PAP) led by Trade and Industry Minister Lim Hng Kiang. The RP team lost after garnering 33.43% of the vote against the PAP team's 66.57%.

=== 2013 by-election ===
In 2013, after PAP Member of Parliament Michael Palmer resigned from the PAP and gave up his parliamentary seat in Punggol East SMC, a by-election was held on 26 January 2013. Jeyaretnam contested the by-election, which turned out to be a four-cornered fight pitting him against three other candidates: Koh Poh Koon of the PAP; Lee Li Lian of the Workers' Party; and Desmond Lim of the Singapore Democratic Alliance. The by-election concluded with a victory for Lee, who won with 54.5% of the vote against Koh's 43.73%, Jeyaretnam's 1.2%, and Lim's 0.57%. Since he got lower than 12.5% of the vote, Jeyaretnam forfeited his election deposit of S$14,500 under Singapore's electoral rules.

After his candidacy was first announced, Jeyaretnam and his family in London received multiple death threats, including threats to castrate his son. He made a police report and the police arrested a 23-year-old man working as a clerk in Singapore Press Holdings's classified ads department.

=== 2015 general election ===
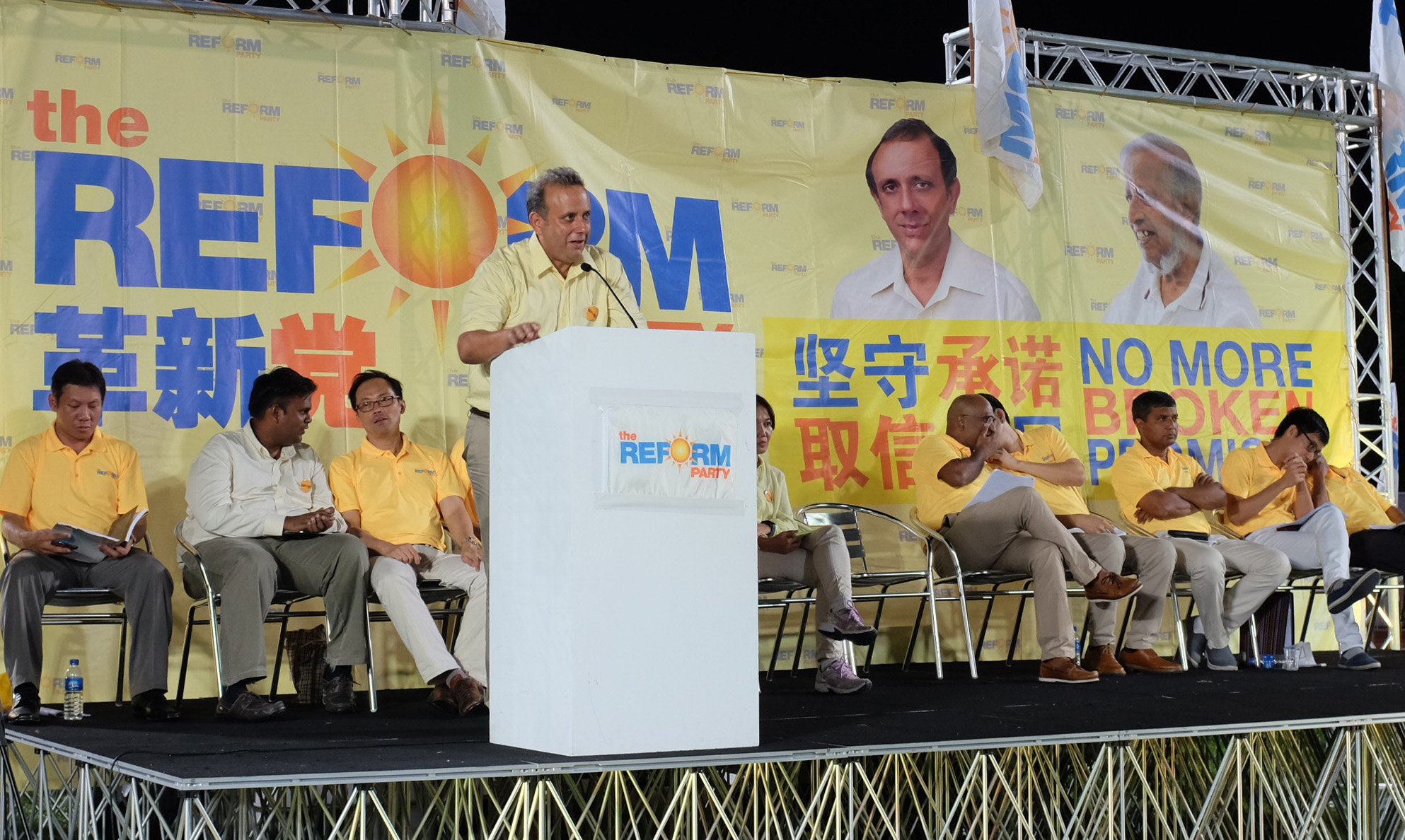
Jeyaretnam speaking at a RP rally during the 2015 general election

Jeyaretnam led a four-member RP team to contest the West Coast GRC again during the 2015 general election against a four-member PAP team led by Trade and Industry Minister Lim Hng Kiang. The RP lost with 21.43% of the vote against the PAP team's 78.57%.

=== 2020 general election ===
During the 2020 general election, Jeyaretnam switched to leading a five-member RP team to contest the Ang Mo Kio GRC against a five-member PAP team led by Prime Minister Lee Hsien Loong. The RP team lost after garnering 28.09% of the vote against the PAP team's 71.91%.

== Constitutional challenge over IMF loan ==
In July 2012, acting in his personal capacity as a citizen, Jeyaretnam applied for leave to seek judicial review of the Monetary Authority of Singapore's commitment to make a contingent US$4 billion bilateral loan to the International Monetary Fund. He argued that the commitment contravened Article 144 of the Constitution because it had not received prior approval from the Parliament and the President, and sought orders preventing or quashing the commitment.

The High Court refused leave in October 2012. It held that Article 144 applies to guarantees given and loans raised by the Government, but not to loans made by it, and that Jeyaretnam lacked standing because he had not shown that he had suffered special damage or had a private interest affected by the commitment. In October 2013, the Court of Appeal dismissed his appeal with costs, finding that he had neither established a prima facie case of a constitutional breach nor shown that he had standing. The court also stated that a person without an affected right might be granted standing only in a rare case involving an exceptionally grave breach of public duty.

The standing exception discussed in Jeyaretnam was subsequently treated as part of Singapore's public-law standing framework. In Wong Souk Yee v Attorney-General [2019] SGCA 25, the Court of Appeal described Jeyaretnam as having "clarified" that standing may be granted in the rare case of a sufficiently grave breach of a public duty that does not generate corresponding private or public rights. In Ravi s/o Madasamy v Attorney-General [2020] SGHC 221, the High Court described this route to standing as a "very narrow avenue" applicable only in a "rare case". The High Court considered the exception again in Masoud Rahimi bin Mehrzad and others v Attorney-General [2025] SGHC 20, but held that it was inapplicable because that case did not concern a breach of a public duty lacking corresponding private or public rights.

== POFMA and legal cases ==
In July 2023, the first Protection from Online Falsehoods and Manipulation Act (POFMA) order was directed at him. He published an article alleging Singapore Land Authority (SLA) gave the contract to renovate 26 Ridout Road and/or 31 Ridout Road to Livspace, and that this was done because Livspace's Chief Executive Officer (CEO) is the son of Minister Shanmugam.

On 27 July 2023, he posted on Facebook and LinkedIn that SLA charged Minister K Shanmugam and Minister Vivian Balakrishnan rent at below market value for 26 Ridout Road and 31 Ridout Road.

On 22 August 2023, another POFMA order was issued. It is related to three statements. First, Kenneth Jeyaretnam claimed that the arrests of 10 foreign nationals on 15 August 2023 for forgery and money laundering offences were a result of China's Foreign Minister, Wang Yi and China's pressure on Singapore. Second, the Corrupt Practices Investigation Bureau (CPIB) probe into Transport Minister S Iswaran and Ong Beng Seng was a result of foreign pressure. Lastly, the rental rates paid by Shanmugam and Balakrishnan for 26 and 31 Ridout Road, respectively, are locked in over nine years.

Then on 30 August 2023, the government issue another correction on his allegations. He stated that the Government does not expect to fully disburse to the intended beneficiaries the moneys set aside for funds to support the Majulah Package, the Pioneer Generation Package, and the Merdeka Generation Package disbursements. He also stated that as long as a person is a full-time student, that person will be considered employed in Singapore's manpower statistics and that the recent Labour Force Participation Rate for Singapore citizens is a low figure at below 50%. In his article and posts, Kenneth Jeyaretnam also made the statement that SLA rented out 26 and 31 Ridout Road at the rentals it did, because Minister K Shanmugam and Minister Vivian Balakrishnan were going to be its tenants and Minister Shanmugam controlled SLA.

In the next correction issued, he continued to claim in his article and posts that SLA had given preferential treatment to Minister K Shanmugam and Minister Vivian Balakrishnan by renting out 26 and 31 Ridout Road below market value while charging the Housing and Development Board (HDB) inflated prices for land. He then stated that most of the Net Investment Returns Contribution (NIRC) has been transferred into long term funds and therefore does not contribute to actual spending. Third, the article states that of $17 billion in healthcare expenditure, only $8 billion was used as subsidies for Singaporeans.

The government next issued a correction on his allegation that SLA mismanaged State properties by charging Minister K Shanmugam and Minister Vivian Balakrishnan rent at below market value for 26 and 31 Ridout Road, and giving them preferential tenancy terms.

In the POFMA order dated 2 May 2024, it is claimed that he alleged that the Prime Minister and Minister for Law can influence the size of performance bonuses paid to specific High Court Judges.

In March 2025, a post on his blog and social media accounts by Jeyaretnam criticising auxiliary police officers of Singapore resulted in his ninth POFMA order.

In a Facebook post made on 3 March 2025 he claimed that the Government uses its monopoly control over the supply of land and control over demand of land through immigration policies to intentionally drive up land prices, including the prices of HDB flats, so as to increase the value of the reserves. This resulted in another POFMA order.

== Personal life ==
Jeyaretnam married his wife Amanda in 1995, and they have a son. His younger brother, Philip Jeyaretnam, has been a judge of the Supreme Court since 2021.

The Amnesty International's report of Singapore: Relentless Repression cites Jeyaretnam as being in "self-imposed exile" whilst Singapore media reports stated that he had not complied with the invitation to attend an interview with the Singapore Police Force into potential offences. In a Facebook post he refuted this narrative and timeline. He stated that he flew to London for a summer vacation with his family before any suggestion of an investigation into potential offences.

Once in London he states that he developed a deep vein thrombosis, bilateral pulmonary emboli, and other illnesses. As a result he was not medically fit to fly back to Singapore. Jeyaretnam therefore contended that his exile in London was involuntary and forced on him by his medical condition. He stated that he intended, when fit, to return to Singapore to challenge his POFMAs in court. He further stated that he volunteered to attend an interview with the Singapore police force via a digital link or to physically attend the Singapore High Commission or any other venue of their choosing. Jeyaretnam claimed he received no response to his replies, "not even an acknowledgment." He further claimed that "at no point" did he receive any communication "obliging" or "ordering" him to attend.

== Death ==
Jeyaretnam's wife Amanda announced he died in his sleep surrounded by his family in London on 18 July 2026, at the age of 67.
