= Most Valuable Party =

Singaporean political party

Most Valuable Party: Parti Paling Berharga (Malay); 超值党 (Chinese)
- Chinese name: 超值党
- Malay name: Parti Paling Berharga
- Leader: Chia Yun Kai
- Headquarters: Icon Village
- National affiliation: Singapore Democratic Alliance (2025)
- Parliament: 0 / 104

Website
- mostvaluableparty.com

The Most Valuable Party (abbreviation: MVP) is a political party in Singapore.

== History ==
The Most Valuable Party was founded in March 2025. Initially, MVP planned to contest East Coast Group Representation Constituency (GRC). On nomination day for the 2025 general election, it was revealed that MVP had decided to join the Singapore Democratic Alliance to contest Pasir Ris–Changi GRC instead.

On 18 December 2025, the MVP was approved by the Registry of Societies.

== Leadership ==
| No | Name | Years |
|---|---|---|
| 1 | Chia Yun Kai | 2025–Present |

== Electoral performance ==
=== Parliament ===
==== Seats contested ====
| Election | Constituencies contested | Contested vote % | +/– |
|---|---|---|---|
| 2025 | 4-member GRC: Pasir Ris-Changi | 32.3% | New |
