= Teo Ser Luck =

Singaporean politician

- 张思乐
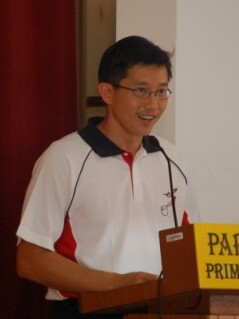
- Teo giving a speech at Park View Primary School in May 2008

Minister of State for Manpower
- In office 1 October 2015 – 30 April 2017 Serving with Sam Tan
- Prime Minister: Lee Hsien Loong
- Minister: Lim Swee Say

Minister of State for Trade and Industry
- In office 21 May 2011 – 30 September 2015
- Prime Minister: Lee Hsien Loong
- Minister: Lim Hng Kiang

Mayor of North East District
- In office 31 May 2009 – 26 May 2017
- Prime Minister: Lee Hsien Loong
- Preceded by: Zainul Abidin
- Succeeded by: Desmond Choo

Member of Parliament for Pasir Ris–Punggol GRC
- In office 6 May 2006 – 23 June 2020
- Preceded by: PAP held
- Succeeded by: PAP held
- Majority: 45,914 (25.7%)

Personal details
- Born: 8 June 1968 (age 58) Singapore
- Party: People's Action Party
- Children: 2
- Relatives: Teo Ser Lee (sister)
- Education: Nanyang Technological University (BAcy)

Teo Ser Luck (Chinese: 张思乐; pinyin: Zhāng Sīlè; born 8 June 1968) is a Singaporean former politician who served as Minister of State for Manpower between 2015 and 2017, Minister of State for Trade and Industry between 2011 and 2015 and Mayor of North East District between 2009 and 2017. A member of the governing People's Action Party (PAP), he was the Member of Parliament (MP) representing the Punggol South ward of Pasir Ris–Punggol GRC between 2006 and 2011 and the Punggol Central ward between 2011 and 2020.

== Career ==
After working at Nike Singapore and Coopers & Lybrand, Teo served as a Vice-President and Managing Director at Menlo Worldwide from 1995 to 2005. From 2005 to 2006, he was the Country Manager and General Manager at DHL Express Singapore. Teo was recognised as a "Young Global Leader" by the World Economic Forum in 2007 for his contributions to the business and community services sectors.

=== Political career ===
Teo was first elected to Parliament at the 2006 general election as a member of the PAP's six-member team in the Pasir Ris–Punggol Group Representation Constituency (GRC). The PAP team, which was led by the Minister for Defence, Teo Chee Hean, defeated the team from the Singapore Democratic Alliance by 113,322 votes (68.7%) to 51,618 (31.3%). In Parliament, Teo represents the Punggol Central ward within the constituency.

Following his election, Teo was appointed a Parliamentary Secretary at the Ministry of Community Development, Youth and Sports (MCYS). In 2008, he was promoted to Senior Parliamentary Secretary at the MCYS and the Ministry of Transport. In 2009, he took on the addition role of Mayor of the North East Community Development Council.

Teo has also served as the Chairman of the National Youth Council and the Chairman of the Young PAP (the youth wing of the party). He was also heavily involved in the organisation of the inaugural Youth Olympic Games in Singapore in 2010. He led Singapore's successful bid for the games and was an advisor to the organising committee.

Teo was re-elected as an MP for Pasir Ris–Punggol GRC at the 2011 general election. Following the election, he was made a Minister of State at the Ministry of Trade and Industry. He continued to serve as Mayor of the North East District.

In 2012, Teo appeared in the Channel 8 drama called Pillow Talk where he shared about his opinion about love.

=== Post political career ===
Teo stepped down as Mayor on 26 May 2017 when his term ended and also relinquished his appointment as Minister of State on 30 June 2017 as he had planned to return to the private sector. He remained as the MP for his constituency until 2020 when he did not stand for the 2020 Singaporean general election.

After public office, he is serving on the boards of the following companies: BRC Asia Limited, Serial System Ltd, China Aviation Oil (Singapore) Corporation Ltd, MindChamps PreSchool Limited and Straco Corporation Limited. Teo also currently serves as President of the Institute of Singapore Chartered Accountants.

== Education ==
Teo attended Rosyth School, Victoria School and Nanyang Junior College, before graduating from the Nanyang Technological University (NTU) with a Bachelor of Accountancy degree in 1992. He subsequently went on to complete a postgraduate diploma at Temasek Polytechnic.

Teo is a former president of the Old Victorians' Association—the alumni body of Victoria School and Victoria Junior College.

In 2007, he received the "Outstanding Young Alumni Award" from Nanyang Technological University (NTU).

== Personal life ==
A Roman Catholic, Teo is married and has two children.

== Notes ==
Parliament of Singapore
Preceded by Charles Chong	Member of Parliament for Pasir Ris–Punggol GRC (Punggol South); 2006 – 2011	Succeeded by Gan Thiam Poh
Preceded by Charles Chong	Member of Parliament for Pasir Ris–Punggol GRC (Punggol Central); 2011 – 2015	Succeeded by Himself as MP (Sengkang Central)
Preceded by Himself as MP (Punggol Central)	Member of Parliament for Pasir Ris–Punggol GRC (Sengkang Central); 2015 – 2020	Succeeded by Raeesah Khan and He Ting Ru as MPs for Sengkang GRC (Compassvale) and (Buangkok)
Government offices
Preceded by Zainul Abidin	Mayor of North East district 2009 – 2017	Succeeded by Desmond Choo
Party political offices
Preceded by Vivian Balakrishnan	Chairman of Young PAP; 2008 – 2012	Succeeded by Chan Chun Sing
