= Singapore Democratic Alliance =

Singaporean political alliance

Singapore Democratic Alliance: Perikatan Demokratik Singapura (Malay); 新加坡民主联盟 (Chinese); Xīnjiāpō Mínzhǔ Liánméng; சிங்கப்பூர் ஜனநாயக கூட்டணி (Tamil); Ciṅkappūr Jaṉanāyaka Kūṭṭaṇi
- Abbreviation: SDA
- Chairman: Desmond Lim
- Secretary-General: Abu bin Mohamed
- Founder: Chiam See Tong
- Founded: 28 June 2001; 25 years ago
- Headquarters: 218F Changi Road, PKMS Building, Singapore
- Current members: Singapore Justice Party; Singapore Malay National Organization
- Colours: Service Blue
- Slogan: Service Before Self
- Parliament: 0 / 104

Party flag

Website
- http://mysda.news/

The Singapore Democratic Alliance (SDA) is a political coalition between the Singapore Malay National Organization (PKMS), and Singapore Justice Party (SJP). The SDA was formed in 2001 and initially consisted of four political parties, PKMS, SJP, National Solidarity Party (NSP) and Singapore People's Party (SPP).

== History ==
=== 2001: Formation ===
SDA was first established in 2001 by Chiam See Tong as he wanted to provide a common grouping under which different opposition parties could stand as a political coalition in elections against the ruling People's Action Party (PAP). The alliance initially consisted of his party SPP, NSP, SJP and PKMS. It was the first coalition to be formed in post-independence since 1963, after the now-defunct Singapore Alliance Party. Chiam became the first chairman of SDA. The logo of SDA is a star and four interlocking circles.

In the 2001 general election, SDA contested a total of thirteen seats consisting of three SMCs (Bukit Timah, Chua Chu Kang, Potong Pasir), and two 5-member GRCs (Jalan Besar, Tampines). In the 2006 general election, SDA contested a total of twenty seats consisting of four SMCs (Chua Chu Kang, MacPherson, Potong Pasir, Yio Chu Kang), two 5-member GRCs (Jalan Besar, Tampines), and one 6-member GRC (Pasir Ris-Punggol). SDA managed to retain the Potong Pasir SMC seat under Chiam through both elections and obtained one NCMP seat under Steve Chia in the 2001 election.

=== 2007–2010: NSP left coalition, failed RP proposal to join coalition ===
In 2007, the NSP pulled out from the SDA in the hope of rejuvenating their party. In 2009, Chiam spoke of the possibility of having Reform Party (RP) to join the SDA. Later in 2010, Kenneth Jeyaretnam, the secretary general of Reform Party (RP), met with Chiam and discussed for RP to join SDA. RP had set out a list of 11 conditions which Chiam and his wife, Lina Loh, mostly agreed to. However, the rest of the leadership of SDA voted not to make a decision on the list of conditions. The discussion by the SDA council was leaked to the press and as a result, Jeyaretnam decided not to join the SDA.

In October 2010, Chiam replaced SDA's secretary general, Desmond Lim Bak Chuan, with Mohamad Hamim Aliyas during a central executive committee meeting of the SPP. SPP founder and chairman Sin Kek Tong said that Chiam's move was due to Lim's opposition to RP joining the SDA. However, in a SDA council meeting held shortly after, the council rejected the decision of Chiam, and Lim remained as the secretary general.

=== 2011–2019 : Post-SPP withdrawal ===
On 2 March 2011, SPP withdrew from the coalition, following the decision by the SDA council to relieve Chiam as chairman, citing frequent "no-shows" at the alliance meetings. Following the pullout, SDA became a two-party alliance consisting of PKMS and SJP. The chairperson was later succeeded by SJP leader Desmond Lim.

Events that followed the separation of Chiam's SPP from SDA saw the waning of the alliance, where they fell short on winning any of the subsequent elections. In the 2011 general election, the SDA, NSP (which fielded a large slate of candidates), and SPP were unsuccessful: Lim became the only candidate forfeiting his electoral deposit (S$16,000) in the only three-cornered contest in the newly formed Punggol East SMC (a ward carved out from the neighbouring Pasir Ris-Punggol GRC, which the alliance also contested); and SDA members who joined as independents contesting in Tanjong Pagar GRC (the election's only uncontested constituency) were disqualified on nomination day.

In the 2013 by-election at Punggol East SMC, Lim contested again, but later conceded defeat during vote counting; ultimately, he garnered only 0.57% of the valid votes cast for the election, resulting him as the second candidate in history (after United People's Front candidate Harbans Singh) to have his deposit forfeited on both times; its score was also the worst-performing result in post-independence Singapore at the time, which has since superseded by the two teams, NSP and the People's Power Party (PPP), who garnered 0.43% and 0.18% of the valid votes while both contesting Tampines GRC in the 2025 election, respectively.

In the 2015 general election, SDA fielded their only team of six in Pasir Ris–Punggol GRC, but with no success.

=== 2020–present : Failed proposed joining of coalition ===
Leading up to the 2020 election, four political parties: Singaporeans First, People's Power Party, Reform Party and Democratic Progressive Party, proposed to form an alliance of their own. Subsequently, the four parties decided to apply to join the SDA, but the plan did not materialize. SDA had contested the 2020 election, marked as Lim's last election leading the SDA. While the party only contested Pasir Ris-Punggol GRC, a three-cornered contest arose with the participation of a third political party, Peoples Voice. This was the second time in Singapore's election history that a multi-cornered fight had taken place in a GRC (the first being 1992's by-election under Marine Parade GRC). SDA garnered 23.67% of the votes while PV ended up losing their deposits after garnering 12.18%.

On 11 March 2025, Lim announced that he had reversed his earlier decision to step down as chairman of the SDA. Lim was supposed to handover to Harminder Pal Singh. However, due to Harminder's health issue, the Central Executive Committee (CEC) decided for Lim to continue leading the alliance. On 13 April, Lim announced that a new party had joined the SDA. It was subsequently revealed on 23 April that Chia Yun Kai, who formed the Most Valuable Party, have yet to be approved by the Registry of Societies, therefore, Chia joined SJP to contest as a SDA candidate to contest for Pasir Ris-Changi GRC in the 2025 general election. However, when the MVP was officially approved on 18 December, it did not join the SDA.

== Objectives ==
SDA wants to address the high cost of living challenges, with the following strategies:

- Regulate wasteful government spending with an independent oversight agency
- Provide financial support for healthcare and address caregiving needs of the working and sandwiched middle class
- Implement rent control and reimburse property tax credit for small local businesses

== Member parties ==
=== Current members ===
- Singapore Justice Party (Founder in 2001)
- Singapore Malay National Organization (Founder in 2001)

=== Former members ===
- National Solidarity Party (Founder in 2001 - 2011, the group eventually left after the 2011 elections)
- Singapore People's Party (Founder in 2001 – 2020, the group eventually left after Chiam See Tong stepped down)

== Leadership ==
| No | Name | Years |
|---|---|---|
| 1 | Chiam See Tong | 2001–2011 |
| 2 | Desmond Lim | 2011–present |

== Former Members of Parliament ==
| No | Name | Constituency | Length of service (cumulative) |
|---|---|---|---|
| 1 | Chiam See Tong | Potong Pasir SMC | 1984–2011 |
| 2 | Steve Chia | Non-Constituency Member of Parliament | 2001–2006 |

== Electoral performance ==
Due to an alliance, the number of respective seats and the results combined from the four parties (NSP, SJP, SPP and PKMS) were reflected in the table. NSP left after the 2011 election while SPP left after Chiam See Tong stepped down in 2020.

=== Parliament ===
| Election | Leader | Votes | % | Seats | | | | | NCMPs | Position | Result |
| Election | Leader | Votes | % | Contested | | | Total | +/– | NCMPs | Position | Result |
| Election | Leader | Votes | % | Seats | Won | Lost | Total | +/– | NCMPs | Position | Result |
|---|---|---|---|---|---|---|---|---|---|---|---|
| 2001 | Chiam See Tong | 75,248 | 12.03% | 13 | 1 | 12 | 1 / 84 | ▲1 | 1 / 1 | ▲2nd | Opposition |
| 2006 | Chiam See Tong | 145,628 | 12.96% | 20 | 1 | 19 | 1 / 84 | Steady | 0 / 1 | ▼3rd | Opposition |
| 2011 | Desmond Lim | 55,988 | 2.78% | 7 | 0 | 7 | 0 / 87 | ▼1 | 0 / 3 | ▼7th | No seats |
| 2015 | Desmond Lim | 46,550 | 2.06% | 6 | 0 | 6 | 0 / 89 | Steady | 0 / 3 | ▼8th | No seats |
| 2020 | Desmond Lim | 37,237 | 1.49% | 5 | 0 | 5 | 0 / 93 | Steady | 0 / 2 | ▼9th | No seats |
| 2025 | Desmond Lim | 29,109 | 1.22% | 4 | 0 | 4 | 0 / 97 | Steady | 0 / 2 | ▲7th | No seats |

==== Seats contested ====
| Election | Constituencies contested | Contested vote % | +/– |
|---|---|---|---|
| 2001 | 5-member GRC: Jalan Besar, Tampines; SMC: Bukit Timah, Chua Chu Kang, Potong Pasir | 27.6% | —N/a |
| 2006 | 6-member GRC: Pasir Ris-Punggol; 5-member GRC: Jalan Besar, Tampines; SMC: Chua Chu Kang, MacPherson, Potong Pasir, Yio Chu Kang | 32.5% | ▲4.9% |
| 2011 | 6-member GRC: Pasir Ris-Punggol; SMC: Punggol East^{1} | 30.1% | ▼2.4% |
| 2015 | 6-member GRC: Pasir Ris-Punggol | 27.1% | ▼3.0% |
| 2020 | 5-member GRC: Pasir Ris-Punggol | 23.7% | ▼3.4% |
| 2025 | 4-member GRC: Pasir Ris-Changi | 32.3% | ▲8.6% |

=== By-election ===
| Election | Leader | Constituency contested | Votes | % | Seats | | | | Result |
| Election | Leader | Constituency contested | Votes | % | Contested | | Total | +/– | Result |
| Election | Leader | Constituency contested | Votes | % | Won | Lost | Total | +/– | Result |
|---|---|---|---|---|---|---|---|---|---|
| 2013 | Desmond Lim | Punggol East SMC^{1} | 168 | 0.57% | 0 | 1 | 0 / 1 | Steady | Lost |

1. : Loss of candidate election deposit(s) in contested seat(s)
