= Pasir Ris–Punggol Group Representation Constituency =

Electoral division in Singapore

Coordinates: 1.376°N 103.943°E

Pasir Ris–Punggol
- Former Group Representation constituency for the Parliament of Singapore
- Region: East and North-East Regions, Singapore
- Electorate: 166,556

Former constituency
- Created: 2001; 25 years ago
- Abolished: 2025; 1 year ago
- Seats: 5
- Member: Constituency Abolished
- Town Council: Pasir Ris–Punggol
- Created from: Pasir Ris GRC; Cheng San GRC
- Replaced by: Punggol GRC; Pasir Ris-Changi GRC

The Pasir Ris–Punggol Group Representation Constituency was a five-member Group Representation Constituency (GRC) in the north-eastern and eastern regions of Singapore. At abolition, the constituency consisted of Pasir Ris and parts of the Punggol town area, comprising 5 wards: Pasir Ris Central, Pasir Ris East, Pasir Ris West, Punggol Shore as well as Punggol Coast managed by Pasir Ris—Punggol Town Council.

== History ==
Its first contest happened in 2006 with the opponent being Singapore Democratic Alliance. For the 2011 general election, the incumbent People's Action Party announced that their team would be led by Teo Chee Hean, and include Teo Ser Luck, Penny Low, as well as new candidates Janil Puthucheary, Gan Thiam Poh and Zainal Sapari. In the 2015 general election, Penny Low retired from politics and new candidates Ng Chee Meng and Sun Xueling joined the team.

Prior to the 2020 general election, the GRC was reduced to five members, with the new Punggol West Single Member Constituency (SMC) and Sengkang Central ward (which would become part of the new Sengkang GRC) carved out. The Tampines retail park (part of the Pasir Ris area) was also redrawn into Tampines GRC. During the election, the contest for the GRC was a three-cornered fight between PAP, Singapore Democratic Alliance (SDA) and Peoples Voice (PV). PAP was led by Senior Minister Teo Chee Hean, SDA was led by Desmond Lim, who announced that he would step down as chairman after the election and PV was led by Lim Tean. The PAP team eventually won the contest with 64.16 percent of the vote. while SDA garnered 23.67 percent. PV lost its $67,500 election deposit after garnering only 12.18 percent of the votes, falling just 0.32 percent short of the one-eighth threshold (12.5 percent) in order to keep their deposit.

=== Abolition ===
In 2025, the GRC was abolished and split up into two portions to form two new GRCs. The Punggol estates were merged with Punggol West SMC to form the Punggol GRC and the remaining estates, along with the Loyang and Flora estates in the East Coast GRC, formed the Pasir Ris–Changi GRC.

== Members of Parliament ==
Year	Division	Members of Parliament	Party
Formation
2001	Pasir Ris East; Pasir Ris West; Punggol North; Punggol South; Punggol Central	Ahmad Magad; Teo Chee Hean; Penny Low; Charles Chong; Michael Lim	PAP
2006	Pasir Ris East; Pasir Ris West; Punggol North; Punggol South; Punggol Central; Punggol East	Ahmad Magad; Teo Chee Hean; Penny Low; Teo Ser Luck; Charles Chong; Michael Palmer	PAP
2011	Pasir Ris East; Pasir Ris West; Punggol North; Punggol South; Punggol Central; Punggol West	Zainal bin Sapari; Teo Chee Hean; Penny Low; Gan Thiam Poh; Teo Ser Luck; Janil Puthucheary	PAP
2015	Pasir Ris East; Pasir Ris West; Punggol North; Sengkang Central; Punggol West; Punggol Coast	Zainal bin Sapari; Teo Chee Hean; Ng Chee Meng; Teo Ser Luck; Sun Xueling; Janil Puthucheary	PAP
2020	Pasir Ris East; Pasir Ris Central; Pasir Ris West; Punggol Shore; Punggol Coast	Sharael Taha; Desmond Tan; Teo Chee Hean; Yeo Wan Ling; Janil Puthucheary	PAP
Constituency abolished (2025)

== Electoral results ==
Note: The Elections Department does not include rejected votes when calculating the vote shares of candidates. Hence, all candidates' vote shares will total to 100% at any given election (may not appear so in multi-way contests due to rounding).

=== Elections in 2000s ===
General Election 2001
Party	Candidate	Votes	%
PAP	Ahmad Magad; Charles Chong; Michael Lim; Penny Low; Teo Chee Hean	Unopposed	
Registered electors		134,151	
PAP win (new seat)			

General Election 2006
Party	Candidate	Votes	%	±%
PAP	Ahmad Magad Charles Chong Michael Palmer Penny Low Teo Ser Luck Teo Chee Hean	113,322	68.70	N/A
SDA	Desmond Lim Ishark Bin Haroun Lineker Lee Hock Huat Mohamad Hamim Bin Aliyas Ong Beng Soon Elvin Yen Kim Khooi	51,618	31.30	N/A
Majority		61,704	37.40	N/A
Total valid votes		164,940	97.50	N/A
Rejected ballots		4,232	2.50	N/A
Turnout		169,172	94.80	N/A
Registered electors		178,443		▲33.02
PAP hold				

=== Elections in 2010s ===
General Election 2011
Party	Candidate	Votes	%	±%
PAP	Gan Thiam Poh Janil Puthucheary Penny Low Teo Chee Hean Teo Ser Luck Zainal Sapari	100,493	64.79	▼3.91
SDA	Harminder Pal Singh Jeffrey Lim Patrick Lee Song Juan Mohd Shafni Ahmad Sidney Soon Tan Keng Hong	54,601	35.21	▲3.91
Majority		45,892	29.58	▼7.82
Total valid votes		155,094	97.15	▼0.35
Rejected ballots		4,545	2.85	▲0.35
Turnout		159,639	94.48	▼0.32
Registered electors		168,971		▼5.31
PAP hold		Swing	▼3.91	

General Election 2015
Party	Candidate	Votes	%	±%
PAP	Janil Puthucheary Ng Chee Meng Sun Xueling Teo Chee Hean Teo Ser Luck Zainal Sapari	125,166	72.89	▲8.10
SDA	Abu Mohammed Arthero Lim Desmond Lim Harminder Pal Singh Ong Teik Seng Wong Way Weng	46,550	27.11	▼8.10
Majority		78,616	45.78	▲16.20
Total valid votes		171,716	97.00	▼0.15
Rejected ballots		5,314	3.00	▲0.15
Turnout		177,030	94.47	▼0.01
Registered electors		187,396		▲10.90
PAP hold		Swing	▲8.10	

=== Elections in 2020s ===
General Election 2020
Party	Candidate	Votes	%	±%
PAP	Desmond Tan Sharael Taha Janil Puthucheary Teo Chee Hean Yeo Wan Ling	100,932	64.16	▼8.75
SDA	Abu Mohamed Desmond Lim Harminder Pal Singh Kelvin Ong Kuswadi Atnawi	37,237	23.67	▼3.44
PV	Gilbert Goh Jireh Lim Mohamed Nassir Ismail Prabu Ramachandran Vigneswari Ramachandran	19,147	12.17	N/A
Majority		63,695	40.49	▼5.29
Total valid votes		157,316	97.89	▼3.42
Rejected ballots		3,395	2.11	▲3.42
Turnout		160,711	96.49	▲2.12
Registered electors		166,556		▼11.12
PAP hold		Swing	▼8.75	
