= Teo Chee Hean =

Singaporean politician (born 1954)

Teo Chee Hean PPA(E)
- 张志贤
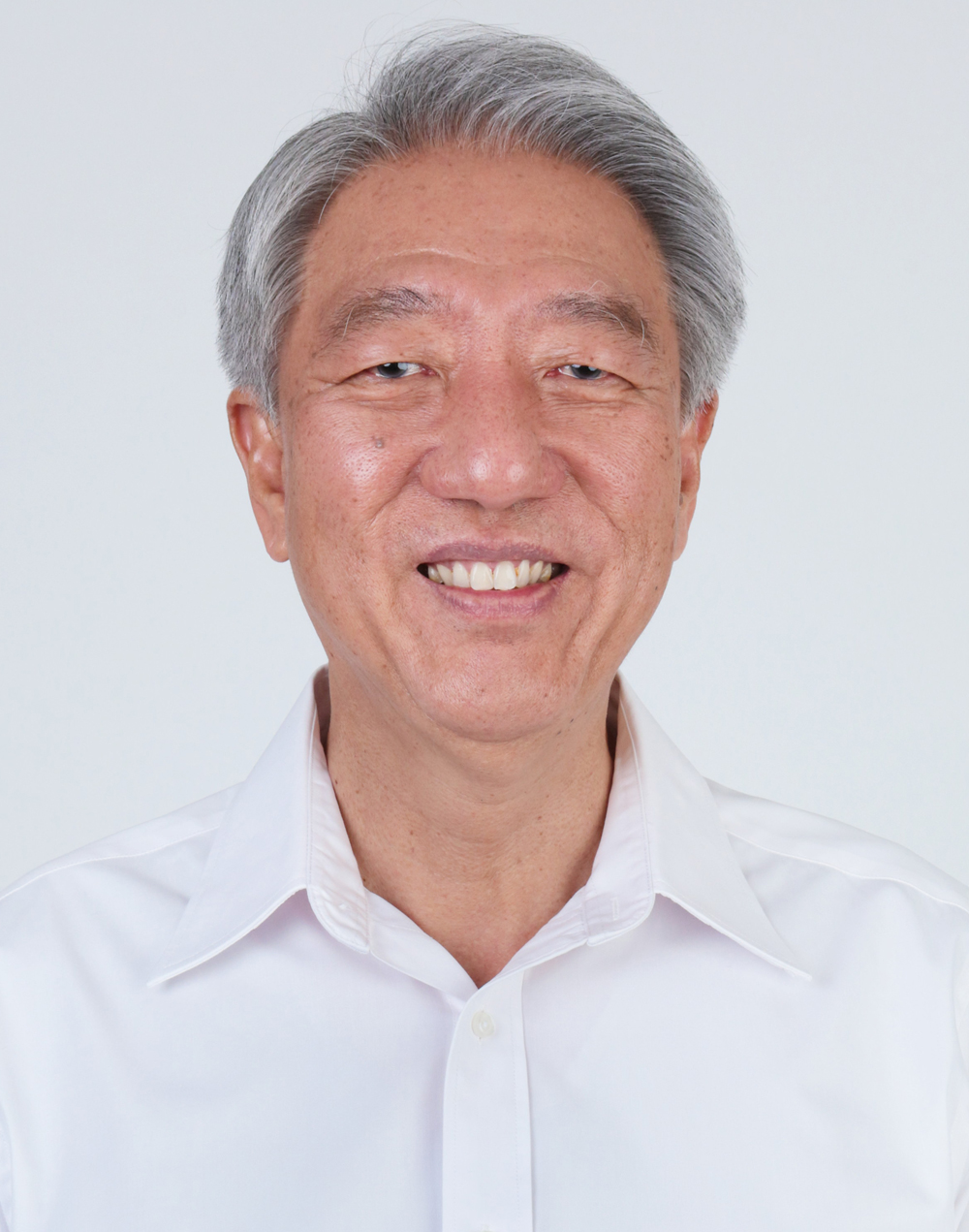
- Official portrait, 2021

Senior Minister of Singapore
- In office 1 May 2019 – 22 May 2025 Serving with Tharman Shanmugaratnam (2019–2023); Lee Hsien Loong (2024–2025)
- Prime Minister: Lee Hsien Loong; Lawrence Wong
- Preceded by: Vacant
- Succeeded by: Vacant

Coordinating Minister for National Security
- In office 21 May 2011 – 22 May 2025
- Prime Minister: Lee Hsien Loong; Lawrence Wong
- Preceded by: Wong Kan Seng
- Succeeded by: K. Shanmugam

Deputy Prime Minister of Singapore
- In office 1 April 2009 – 30 April 2019 Serving with Tharman Shanmugaratnam
- Prime Minister: Lee Hsien Loong
- Preceded by: S. Jayakumar; Wong Kan Seng
- Succeeded by: Heng Swee Keat; Lawrence Wong

Minister for Home Affairs
- In office 21 May 2011 – 30 September 2015
- Prime Minister: Lee Hsien Loong
- Second Minister: S. Iswaran; Masagos Zulkifli
- Preceded by: K. Shanmugam
- Succeeded by: K. Shanmugam

Minister for Defence
- In office 1 August 2003 – 20 May 2011
- Prime Minister: Goh Chok Tong; Lee Hsien Loong
- Second Minister: Ng Eng Hen
- Preceded by: Tony Tan
- Succeeded by: Ng Eng Hen

Minister for Education
- In office 25 January 1997 – 31 July 2003
- Prime Minister: Goh Chok Tong
- Preceded by: Lee Yock Suan
- Succeeded by: Tharman Shanmugaratnam

Minister for the Environment
- In office 15 January 1996 – 24 January 1997; Acting: 17 April 1995 – 14 January 1996
- Prime Minister: Goh Chok Tong
- Preceded by: Mah Bow Tan
- Succeeded by: Yeo Cheow Tong

Member of the Singapore Parliament for Pasir Ris–Punggol GRC (Pasir Ris West Division)
- In office 25 October 2001 – 15 April 2025
- Preceded by: Constituency established
- Succeeded by: Indranee Rajah; Pasir Ris–Changi GRC (Pasir Ris West)

Member of the Singapore Parliament for Pasir Ris GRC (Pasir Ris Loyang Division)
- In office 2 January 1997 – 18 October 2001
- Preceded by: Constituency established
- Succeeded by: Constituency abolished

Member of the Singapore Parliament for Marine Parade GRC (Joo Chiat Division)
- In office 19 December 1992 – 15 December 1996
- Preceded by: Lim Chee Onn
- Succeeded by: Chan Soo Sen

Personal details
- Born: Teo Chee Hean; 27 December 1954 (age 71) Singapore
- Party: People's Action Party
- Spouse: Chew Poh Yim (died 2021)
- Children: 2
- Education: University of Manchester (BS); Imperial College London (MS); Harvard University (MPA)

Military service
- Branch/service: Republic of Singapore Navy
- Years of service: 1972–1992
- Rank: Rear-Admiral

Teo Chee Hean (Note: Chinese: 张志贤; Pe̍h-ōe-jī: Tioⁿ Chì-hiân; pinyin: Zhāng Zhìxián) (born 27 December 1954) is a Singaporean former politician and naval officer who served as Senior Minister of Singapore and Coordinating Minister for National Security from 2019 and 2015 respectively until 2025. He served as the Member of Parliament (MP) representing the Pasir Ris West division of Pasir Ris–Punggol Group Representation Constituency from 2001 to 2025.

A recipient of the President's Scholarship and Singapore Armed Forces Overseas Scholarship, Teo served in the Republic of Singapore Navy (RSN) between 1972 and 1992, and attained the rank of Rear-Admiral (Two-Star). He served as Chief of Navy in 1991 and 1992 before leaving the Navy and entering politics.

He made his political debut in the 1992 by-election in Marine Parade GRC as part of a four-member PAP team. He had served as 6th Deputy Prime Minister between 2009 and 2019, Minister for the Environment between 1995 and 1997, Minister for Education between 1997 and 2003, Minister for Defence between 2003 and 2011 and Minister for Home Affairs between 2011 and 2015. Teo was part of the ministerial committee of the Smart Nation and Digital Government Group (SNDGG). As Senior Minister, Teo had served as acting prime minister in several occasions, during Prime Minister Lee Hsien Loong's absence.

Within the PAP, Teo was First Assistant Secretary-General in the party's Central Executive Committee (CEC) before he was succeeded by Heng Swee Keat in November 2018.

== Education ==
Teo was educated at St. Joseph's Institution before he was awarded the President's Scholarship and Singapore Armed Forces Overseas Scholarship in 1973. He graduated from the University of Manchester in 1976 with a Bachelor of Science with first class honours degree in electrical engineering and management science.

He subsequently went on to complete a Master of Science with distinction degree in computing science at Imperial College London in 1977. He also completed a Master of Public Administration degree at Harvard Kennedy School in 1986, where he was named a Littauer Fellow.

== Career ==
=== Military career ===
Teo joined the Singapore Armed Forces (SAF) in 1972 and was commissioned as a naval officer at the SAFTI Military Institute in 1973. He went on to hold various command and staff appointments in the Republic of Singapore Navy (RSN) and the Joint Staff before his appointment as Chief of Navy in 1991 with the rank of Rear-Admiral (Two-Star) before leaving the SAF on 7 December 1992 to contest in the 1992 by-elections in Marine Parade GRC.

Teo was awarded the Commendation Medal (Silver) (Military) and the Public Administration Medal (Gold) (Military) in the 1981 and 1992 National Day Awards respectively.

=== Political career ===
Teo made his political debut in the 1992 by-elections in Marine Parade GRC as part of a four-member PAP team led by Prime Minister Goh Chok Tong. After the PAP team won 72.9% of the vote against three opposition parties, Teo was elected as the Member of Parliament (MP) representing the Joo Chiat ward of Marine Parade GRC. He was subsequently appointed as Minister of State for Finance, Minister of State for Communications and Minister of State for Defence.

In April 1995, Teo was appointed as Senior Minister of State for Defence and Acting Minister for the Environment. In January 1996, he was promoted to full Minister and given the Cabinet portfolios of Minister for the Environment and Second Minister for Defence.

Teo switched to contesting in Pasir Ris GRC during the 1997 general election and the four-member PAP team led by him won 70.9% of the vote against the Workers' Party. Teo thus elected as the MP representing the Pasir Ris Loyang ward of Pasir Ris GRC. In subsequent Cabinet reshuffles, he became Minister for Education while continuing to serve as Second Minister for Defence.

During the 2001 general election, Teo led the five-member PAP team contesting in the newly formed Pasir Ris–Punggol GRC and won an uncontested walkover. After winning the general election, he continued to hold his previous Cabinet portfolios while becoming the MP representing the Pasir Ris West ward of Pasir Ris–Punggol GRC. On 1 August 2003, Teo was appointed as Minister for Defence and Minister-in-charge of the Civil Service.

During the 2006 general election, Teo led a six-member PAP team to contest in Pasir–Ris Punggol GRC again and won 68.7% of the vote against the Singapore Democratic Alliance. He retained his parliamentary seat and continued holding his Cabinet portfolios. On 1 April 2009, Teo was appointed as one of two Deputy Prime Ministers, in addition to his portfolios as Minister for Defence and Minister-in-charge of the Civil Service.

Teo led a six-member PAP team to contest in Pasir–Ris Punggol GRC in the 2011 general election and won 64.79% of the vote against the Singapore Democratic Alliance. On 18 May 2011, Teo relinquished his Cabinet portfolio of Minister for Defence and took up the positions of Minister for Home Affairs and Coordinating Minister for National Security, while concurrently serving as Deputy Prime Minister and Minister-in-charge of the Civil Service.

On 1 May 2019, Teo relinquished his appointment as Deputy Prime Minister to become a Senior Minister, while retaining his position as Coordinating Minister for National Security. In his new role, he also oversaw four departments under the Prime Minister's Office; Smart Nation and Digital Government Group, National Security Coordination Secretariat, National Population and Talent Division, and the National Climate Change Secretariat.

On 21 April 2025, Teo announced that he will not be contesting for the Pasir Ris–Changi GRC in the 2025 general election.

On 23 April, on the Nomination Day for the 2025 general election, Teo was not nominated as a candidate for any constituencies. Prime Minister Lawrence Wong later then announced Teo's retirement from politics in a Facebook post. Teo was then appointed Senior Advisor in the Prime Minister's Office.

=== Post political career ===
On 6 June 2025, Temasek Holdings announced that Teo will join its board of director on 1 July and succeed Lim Boon Heng as chairman on 9 October. On 10 June, GIC announced that Teo has resigned from its board of directors and as chairman of its international advisory board, effective 30 June.

== Personal life ==
Teo was married to Chew Poh Yim, who was the director of the business consultancy and part-time marketing management at Nanyang Polytechnic's School of Business Management. Chew graduated from the University of Manchester Institute of Science and Technology in 1977 with a Bachelor of Science with honours degree in biochemistry. In 2015, she founded Stroke Support Station, a volunteering organisation that provides assistance to stroke survivors and caregivers. Chew died on 31 October 2021 at the age of 67. The couple have one son and one daughter.

Teo was also the president of the Singapore National Olympic Council (SNOC) between 1998 and 2014, and an advisor to the Singapore Dragon Boat Association.

== Honours ==
- 1981: Pingat Penghargaan, Perak (Tentera) - Commendation Medal (Silver) (Military)
- 1992: Pingat Pentadbiran Awam, Emas (Tentera) - Public Administration Medal (Gold) (Military)

== Bibliography ==
- (in Chinese) Liu, Changping & Zhang, He, 风雨晚晴园(不应忘却的辛亥革命勋臣张永福), 中国文史 (2011), ISBN 9787503431098

Political offices
Preceded by Mah Bow Tan	Minister for the Environment; 1996–1997; Acting: 1995–1996	Succeeded by Lim Swee Say
Recreated Title last held by Lee Boon Yang	Second Minister for Defence; 1996–2003	Succeeded by Ng Eng Hen
Preceded by Lee Yock Suan	Minister for Education; 1997–2003	Succeeded by Tharman Shanmugaratnam
Preceded by Tony Tan	Minister for Defence; 2003–2011	Succeeded by Ng Eng Hen
Preceded by S. Jayakumar	Deputy Prime Minister of Singapore; 2009–2019; Served alongside: Wong Kan Seng (2005–2011), Tharman Shanmugaratnam (2011–2019)	Succeeded by Heng Swee Keat
Preceded by K. Shanmugam	Minister for Home Affairs; 2011–2015	Succeeded by K. Shanmugam
Preceded by Wong Kan Seng	Coordinating Minister for National Security; 2011–2025	Succeeded by K. Shanmugam
Vacant Title last held by S. Jayakumar; Goh Chok Tong; 2011	Senior Minister of Singapore; 2019–2025; Served alongside: Tharman Shanmugaratnam (2019–2023), Lee Hsien Loong (2024–2025)	Vacant
Parliament of Singapore
Preceded by Lim Chee Onn	Member of Parliament for Marine Parade GRC (Joo Chiat); 1992–1997	Succeeded by Chan Soo Sen as MP for East Coast GRC (Joo Chiat)
New constituency	Member of Parliament for Pasir Ris GRC (Pasir Ris Loyang); 1997–2001	Constituency abolished
New constituency	Member of Parliament for Pasir Ris–Punggol GRC (Pasir Ris West); 2001–2025	Succeeded by Indranee Rajah as MP for Pasir Ris–Changi GRC (Pasir Ris West)
Military offices
Preceded by Rear-Admiral James Leo	Chief of the Republic of Singapore Navy; 1991–1992	Succeeded by Rear-Admiral Kwek Siew Jin
