= Fourth Lee Hsien Loong Cabinet =

Cabinet of Singapore 2015–2020

- 16th Cabinet of Singapore
- 2015–2020
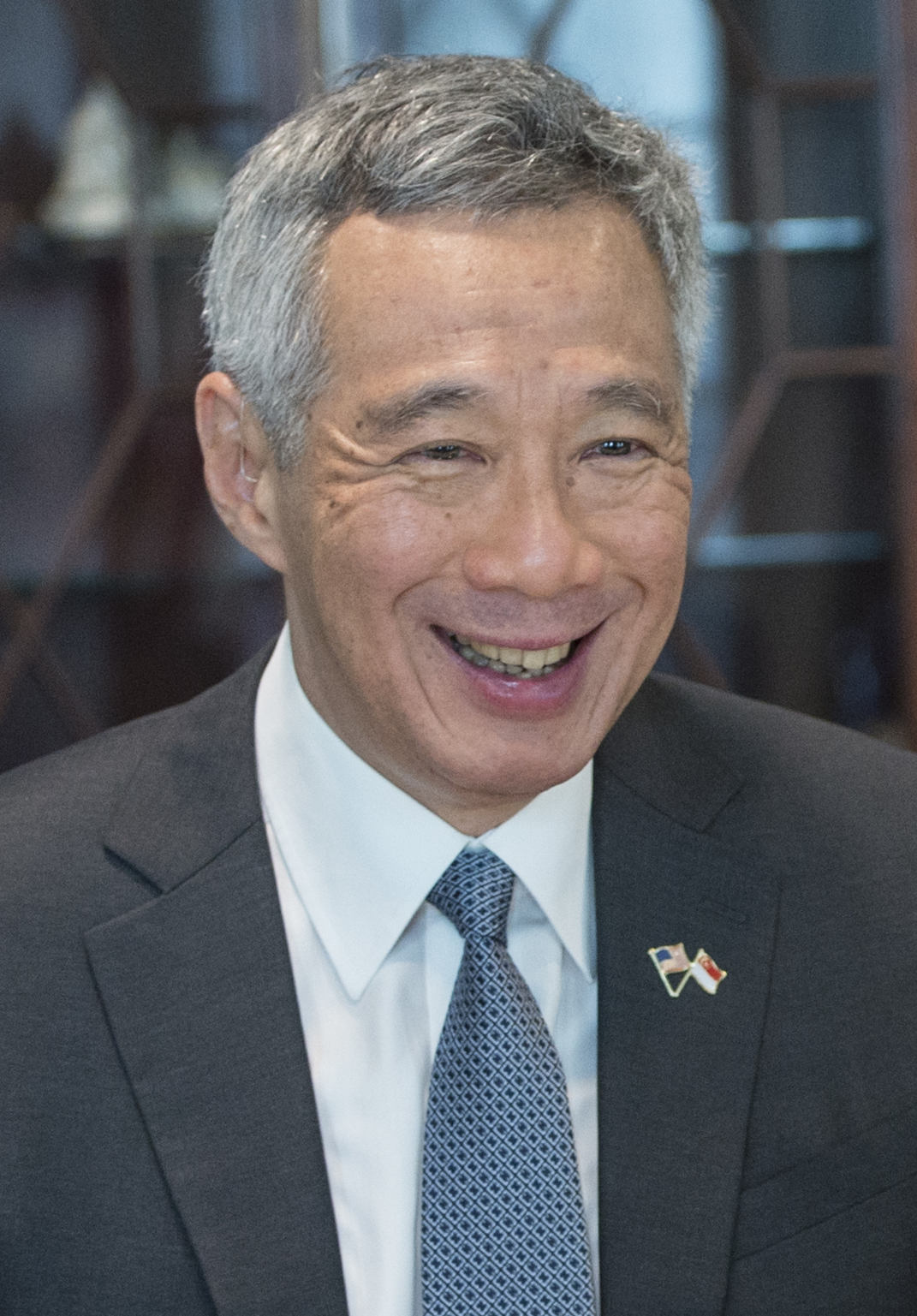
- Date formed: 1 October 2015
- Date dissolved: 26 July 2020

People and organisations
- Head of state: Tony Tan (until 1 September 2017); J. Y. Pillay (acting: 1–14 September 2017); Halimah Yacob (from 14 September 2017)
- Head of government: Lee Hsien Loong
- Deputy head of government: Teo Chee Hean (until 30 April 2019); Tharman Shanmugaratnam (until 30 April 2019); Heng Swee Keat (from 1 May 2019)
- Member party: People's Action Party
- Status in legislature: Supermajority
- Opposition party: Workers' Party
- Opposition leader: Low Thia Khiang (until 8 April 2018); Pritam Singh (from 8 April 2018)

History
- Election: 11 September 2015
- Legislature term: 13th
- Predecessor: Third Lee Hsien Loong Cabinet
- Successor: Fifth Lee Hsien Loong Cabinet

The Fourth Cabinet of Lee Hsien Loong of the Government of Singapore was announced on 28 September 2015 following the 2015 general election on 11 September, and came into effect on 1 October 2015. The day after the election, Prime Minister Lee Hsien Loong told the media that he would form the Cabinet within two weeks.

== Changes ==
Position	Incoming	Outgoing
Minister for Education	Ong Ye Kung	
Minister for Education	Ng Chee Meng	
Minister for Transport		Lui Tuck Yew
Minister in the Prime Minister's Office		Ng Chee Meng

== Cabinet ==
=== October 2015 – April 2017 ===
Prior to the general election held on 11 September 2015, Transport Minister Lui Tuck Yew announced his retirement on 11 August. All other incumbent office holders successfully defended their parliamentary seats in the elections.

The list of Cabinet ministers and other office-holders was announced on 28 September 2015. In a press conference, Prime Minister Lee Hsien Loong said, "I have given heavy responsibilities to the next generation of Ministers. They will be stretched and tested. They have to prove themselves and must gel together as a team. Soon after the end of this term, we must have a new team ready to take over from me."

Three veteran ministers were named Coordinating Ministers, each of them overseeing a handful of ministries.

- National Security – Teo Chee Hean.
- Economic and Social Policies – Tharman Shanmugaratnam.
- Infrastructure – Khaw Boon Wan.

Minister	Prior to 2015	Appointment
Lui Tuck Yew	Minister for Transport	Retired from politics.
Khaw Boon Wan	Minister for National Development	Moved to Minister for Transport.
Lawrence Wong	Minister for Culture, Community and Youth	Moved to Minister for National Development.
Grace Fu	Minister in Prime Minister's Office, Second Minister for Environment and Water Resources, Second Minister for Foreign Affairs	Moved to Minister for Culture, Community and Youth.
Amy Khor	Senior Minister of State for Health and Manpower	Relinquished Senior Minister of State for Manpower and moved to Senior Minister of State for Environment and Water Resources.
Teo Ser Luck	Minister of State for Trade and Industry	Relinquished Minister of State for Trade and Industry, and moved to Minister of State for Manpower.

Several other ministers will have a change in duties:

- Vivian Balakrishnan – from Environment and Water Resources to Foreign Affairs.
- K. Shanmugam – from Foreign Affairs to Home Affairs, while retaining Law.
- Heng Swee Keat – from Education to Finance.
- Lawrence Wong – from Culture, Community and Youth to National Development.
- Masagos Zulkifli – from the Prime Minister's Office (PMO) to Environment and Water Resources.
- Grace Fu – from the PMO to Culture, Community and Youth.

The Ministry of Education and Ministry of Trade and Industry will each have two full ministers, covering separate aspects.

The cabinet consisted of the following members from 1 October 2015.

Portfolio	Portrait	Name	Term
Prime Minister	Lee Hsien Loong	Lee Hsien Loong	12 August 2004 – 15 May 2024
Deputy Prime Minister	Teo Chee Hean	Teo Chee Hean	1 April 2009 – 30 April 2019
Coordinating Minister for National Security	Teo Chee Hean	Teo Chee Hean	21 May 2011 – 22 May 2025
Deputy Prime Minister	Tharman Shanmugaratnam	Tharman Shanmugaratnam	21 May 2011 – 30 April 2019
Coordinating Minister for Economic and Social Policies	Tharman Shanmugaratnam	Tharman Shanmugaratnam	1 October 2015 – 30 April 2019
Coordinating Minister for Infrastructure	Khaw Boon Wan	Khaw Boon Wan	1 October 2015 – 26 July 2020
Minister for Transport	Khaw Boon Wan	Khaw Boon Wan	1 October 2015 – 26 July 2020
Minister for Trade and Industry (Trade)	Lim Hng Kiang	Lim Hng Kiang	1 October 2015 – 30 April 2018
Minister for Manpower	Lim Swee Say	Lim Swee Say	4 May 2015 – 30 April 2018
Minister for Communications and Information	Yaacob Ibrahim	Yaacob Ibrahim	1 November 2012 – 30 April 2018
Minister-in-charge of Muslim Affairs	Yaacob Ibrahim	Yaacob Ibrahim	25 March 2002 – 30 April 2018
Minister for Defence	Ng Eng Hen	Ng Eng Hen	21 May 2011 – 22 May 2025
Minister for Foreign Affairs	Vivian Balakrishnan	Vivian Balakrishnan	1 October 2015 – present
Minister for Home Affairs	K. Shanmugam	K. Shanmugam	1 October 2015 – present
Minister for Law	K. Shanmugam	K. Shanmugam	1 May 2008 – 22 May 2025
Minister for Health	Gan Kim Yong	Gan Kim Yong	21 May 2011 – 14 May 2021
Minister for Trade and Industry (Industry)	S. Iswaran	S. Iswaran	1 October 2015 – 30 April 2018
Minister for Finance	Heng Swee Keat	Heng Swee Keat	1 October 2015 – 14 May 2021
Minister for Culture, Community and Youth	Grace Fu	Grace Fu	1 October 2015 – 26 July 2020
Minister in the Prime Minister's Office	Chan Chun Sing	Chan Chun Sing	9 April 2015 – 30 April 2018
Minister for Social and Family Development		Tan Chuan-Jin	9 April 2015 – 10 September 2017
Minister for National Development	Lawrence Wong	Lawrence Wong	1 October 2015 – 26 July 2020
Second Minister for Finance	Lawrence Wong	Lawrence Wong	22 August 2016 – 14 May 2021
Minister for the Environment and Water Resources	Masagos Zulkifli	Masagos Zulkifli	1 October 2015 – 26 July 2020
Minister for Education (Schools)	Ng Chee Meng	Ng Chee Meng	1 November 2016 – 30 April 2018
Acting Minister for Education (Schools)	Ng Chee Meng	Ng Chee Meng	1 October 2015 – 31 October 2016
Second Minister for Transport	Ng Chee Meng	Ng Chee Meng	1 November 2016 – 30 April 2018
Minister for Education (Higher Education and Skills)	Ong Ye Kung	Ong Ye Kung	1 November 2016 – 30 April 2018
Acting Minister for Education (Higher Education and Skills)	Ong Ye Kung	Ong Ye Kung	1 October 2015 – 31 October 2016
Second Minister for Defence	Ong Ye Kung	Ong Ye Kung	1 November 2016 – 30 April 2018

=== May – September 2017 ===
The cabinet consisted of the following members from 1 May 2017.

Portfolio	Portrait	Name	Term
Prime Minister	Lee Hsien Loong	Lee Hsien Loong	12 August 2004 – 15 May 2024
Deputy Prime Minister	Teo Chee Hean	Teo Chee Hean	1 April 2009 – 30 April 2019
Coordinating Minister for National Security	Teo Chee Hean	Teo Chee Hean	21 May 2011 – 22 May 2025
Deputy Prime Minister	Tharman Shanmugaratnam	Tharman Shanmugaratnam	21 May 2011 – 30 April 2019
Coordinating Minister for Economic and Social Policies	Tharman Shanmugaratnam	Tharman Shanmugaratnam	1 October 2015 – 30 April 2019
Coordinating Minister for Infrastructure	Khaw Boon Wan	Khaw Boon Wan	1 October 2015 – 26 July 2020
Minister for Transport	Khaw Boon Wan	Khaw Boon Wan	1 October 2015 – 26 July 2020
Minister for Trade and Industry (Trade)	Lim Hng Kiang	Lim Hng Kiang	1 October 2015 – 30 April 2018
Minister for Manpower	Lim Swee Say	Lim Swee Say	4 May 2015 – 30 April 2018
Minister for Communications and Information	Yaacob Ibrahim	Yaacob Ibrahim	1 November 2012 – 30 April 2018
Minister-in-charge of Muslim Affairs	Yaacob Ibrahim	Yaacob Ibrahim	25 March 2002 – 30 April 2018
Minister for Defence	Ng Eng Hen	Ng Eng Hen	21 May 2011 – 22 May 2025
Minister for Foreign Affairs	Vivian Balakrishnan	Vivian Balakrishnan	1 October 2015 – present
Minister for Home Affairs	K. Shanmugam	K. Shanmugam	1 October 2015 – present
Minister for Law	K. Shanmugam	K. Shanmugam	1 May 2008 – 22 May 2025
Minister for Health	Gan Kim Yong	Gan Kim Yong	21 May 2011 – 14 May 2021
Minister for Trade and Industry (Industry)	S. Iswaran	S. Iswaran	1 October 2015 – 30 April 2018
Minister for Finance	Heng Swee Keat	Heng Swee Keat	1 October 2015 – 14 May 2021
Minister for Culture, Community and Youth	Grace Fu	Grace Fu	1 October 2015 – 26 July 2020
Minister in the Prime Minister's Office	Chan Chun Sing	Chan Chun Sing	9 April 2015 – 30 April 2018
Minister for Social and Family Development		Tan Chuan-Jin	9 April 2015 – 10 September 2017
Minister for National Development	Lawrence Wong	Lawrence Wong	1 October 2015 – 26 July 2020
Second Minister for Finance	Lawrence Wong	Lawrence Wong	22 August 2016 – 14 May 2021
Minister for the Environment and Water Resources	Masagos Zulkifli	Masagos Zulkifli	1 October 2015 – 26 July 2020
Minister for Education (Schools)	Ng Chee Meng	Ng Chee Meng	1 November 2016 – 30 April 2018
Second Minister for Transport	Ng Chee Meng	Ng Chee Meng	1 November 2016 – 30 April 2018
Minister for Education (Higher Education and Skills)	Ong Ye Kung	Ong Ye Kung	1 November 2016 – 30 April 2018
Second Minister for Defence	Ong Ye Kung	Ong Ye Kung	1 November 2016 – 30 April 2018
Minister in the Prime Minister's Office		Josephine Teo	1 May 2017 – 30 April 2018
Second Minister for Manpower		Josephine Teo	1 May 2017 – 30 April 2018
Second Minister for Foreign Affairs		Josephine Teo	1 May 2017 – 10 September 2017
Minister in the Prime Minister's Office		Desmond Lee	1 May 2017 – 10 September 2017
Second Minister for Home Affairs		Desmond Lee	1 May 2017 – 10 September 2017
Second Minister for National Development		Desmond Lee	1 May 2017 – 26 July 2020

=== September 2017 – April 2018 ===
The cabinet consisted of the following members from 11 September 2017.

Portfolio	Portrait	Name	Term
Prime Minister	Lee Hsien Loong	Lee Hsien Loong	12 August 2004 – 15 May 2024
Deputy Prime Minister	Teo Chee Hean	Teo Chee Hean	1 April 2009 – 30 April 2019
Coordinating Minister for National Security	Teo Chee Hean	Teo Chee Hean	21 May 2011 – 22 May 2025
Deputy Prime Minister	Tharman Shanmugaratnam	Tharman Shanmugaratnam	21 May 2011 – 30 April 2019
Coordinating Minister for Economic and Social Policies	Tharman Shanmugaratnam	Tharman Shanmugaratnam	1 October 2015 – 30 April 2019
Coordinating Minister for Infrastructure	Khaw Boon Wan	Khaw Boon Wan	1 October 2015 – 26 July 2020
Minister for Transport	Khaw Boon Wan	Khaw Boon Wan	1 October 2015 – 26 July 2020
Minister for Trade and Industry (Trade)	Lim Hng Kiang	Lim Hng Kiang	1 October 2015 – 30 April 2018
Minister for Manpower	Lim Swee Say	Lim Swee Say	4 May 2015 – 30 April 2018
Minister for Communications and Information	Yaacob Ibrahim	Yaacob Ibrahim	1 November 2012 – 30 April 2018
Minister-in-charge of Muslim Affairs	Yaacob Ibrahim	Yaacob Ibrahim	25 March 2002 – 30 April 2018
Minister for Defence	Ng Eng Hen	Ng Eng Hen	21 May 2011 – 22 May 2025
Minister for Foreign Affairs	Vivian Balakrishnan	Vivian Balakrishnan	1 October 2015 – present
Minister for Home Affairs	K. Shanmugam	K. Shanmugam	1 October 2015 – present
Minister for Law	K. Shanmugam	K. Shanmugam	1 May 2008 – 22 May 2025
Minister for Health	Gan Kim Yong	Gan Kim Yong	21 May 2011 – 14 May 2021
Minister for Trade and Industry (Industry)	S. Iswaran	S. Iswaran	1 October 2015 – 30 April 2018
Minister for Finance	Heng Swee Keat	Heng Swee Keat	1 October 2015 – 14 May 2021
Minister for Culture, Community and Youth	Grace Fu	Grace Fu	1 October 2015 – 26 July 2020
Minister in the Prime Minister's Office	Chan Chun Sing	Chan Chun Sing	9 April 2015 – 30 April 2018
Minister for National Development	Lawrence Wong	Lawrence Wong	1 October 2015 – 26 July 2020
Second Minister for Finance	Lawrence Wong	Lawrence Wong	22 August 2016 – 14 May 2021
Minister for the Environment and Water Resources	Masagos Zulkifli	Masagos Zulkifli	1 October 2015 – 26 July 2020
Minister for Education (Schools)	Ng Chee Meng	Ng Chee Meng	1 November 2016 – 30 April 2018
Second Minister for Transportation	Ng Chee Meng	Ng Chee Meng	1 November 2016 – 30 April 2018
Minister for Education (Higher Education and Skills)	Ong Ye Kung	Ong Ye Kung	1 November 2016 – 30 April 2018
Second Minister for Defence	Ong Ye Kung	Ong Ye Kung	1 November 2016 – 30 April 2018
Minister in the Prime Minister's Office		Josephine Teo	1 May 2017 – 30 April 2018
Second Minister for Home Affairs		Josephine Teo	11 September 2017 – 22 May 2025
Second Minister for Manpower		Josephine Teo	1 May 2017 – 30 April 2018
Minister for Social and Family Development		Desmond Lee	11 September 2017 – 26 July 2020
Second Minister for National Development		Desmond Lee	1 May 2017 – 26 July 2020

=== May 2018 – April 2019 ===
The cabinet consisted of the following members from 1 May 2018.

Portfolio	Portrait	Name	Term
Prime Minister	Lee Hsien Loong	Lee Hsien Loong	12 August 2004 – 15 May 2024
Deputy Prime Minister	Teo Chee Hean	Teo Chee Hean	1 April 2009 – 30 April 2019
Coordinating Minister for National Security	Teo Chee Hean	Teo Chee Hean	21 May 2011 – 22 May 2025
Deputy Prime Minister	Tharman Shanmugaratnam	Tharman Shanmugaratnam	21 May 2011 – 30 April 2019
Coordinating Minister for Economic and Social Policies	Tharman Shanmugaratnam	Tharman Shanmugaratnam	1 October 2015 – 30 April 2019
Coordinating Minister for Infrastructure	Khaw Boon Wan	Khaw Boon Wan	1 October 2015 – 26 July 2020
Minister for Transport	Khaw Boon Wan	Khaw Boon Wan	1 October 2015 – 26 July 2020 (Note: Vivian Balakrishnan stood in as acting Minister for Transport from 25 February until 5 April 2019, for Khaw Boon Wan, who was on leave.)
Minister for Defence	Ng Eng Hen	Ng Eng Hen	21 May 2011 – 22 May 2025
Minister for Foreign Affairs	Vivian Balakrishnan	Vivian Balakrishnan	1 October 2015 – present
Minister for Home Affairs	K. Shanmugam	K. Shanmugam	1 October 2015 – present
Minister for Law	K. Shanmugam	K. Shanmugam	1 May 2008 – 22 May 2025
Minister for Health	Gan Kim Yong	Gan Kim Yong	21 May 2011 – 14 May 2021
Minister for Communications and Information	S. Iswaran	S. Iswaran	1 May 2018 – 14 May 2021
Minister-in-charge of Trade Relations	S. Iswaran	S. Iswaran	1 May 2018 – 18 January 2024
Minister for Finance	Heng Swee Keat	Heng Swee Keat	1 October 2015 – 14 May 2021
Minister for Culture, Community and Youth	Grace Fu	Grace Fu	1 October 2015 – 26 July 2020
Minister for Trade and Industry	Chan Chun Sing	Chan Chun Sing	1 May 2018 – 14 May 2021
Minister for National Development	Lawrence Wong	Lawrence Wong	1 October 2015 – 26 July 2020
Second Minister for Finance	Lawrence Wong	Lawrence Wong	22 August 2016 – 14 May 2021
Minister for the Environment and Water Resources	Masagos Zulkifli	Masagos Zulkifli	1 October 2015 – 26 July 2020
Minister-in-charge of Muslim Affairs	Masagos Zulkifli	Masagos Zulkifli	1 May 2018 – 22 May 2025
Minister in the Prime Minister's Office	Ng Chee Meng	Ng Chee Meng	1 May 2018 – 26 July 2020
Minister for Education	Ong Ye Kung	Ong Ye Kung	1 May 2018 – 26 July 2020
Minister for Manpower		Josephine Teo	1 May 2018 – 14 May 2021
Second Minister for Home Affairs		Josephine Teo	11 September 2017 – 22 May 2025
Minister for Social and Family Development		Desmond Lee	11 September 2017 – 26 July 2020
Second Minister for National Development		Desmond Lee	1 May 2017 – 26 July 2020
Minister in the Prime Minister's Office		Indranee Rajah	1 May 2018 – present
Second Minister for Law		Indranee Rajah	1 May 2018 – 30 June 2018
Second Minister for Finance		Indranee Rajah	1 May 2018 – present
Second Minister for Education		Indranee Rajah	1 May 2018 – 26 July 2020

=== May 2019 – July 2020 ===
The cabinet consisted of the following members from 1 May 2019.

Portfolio	Portrait	Name	Term
Prime Minister	Lee Hsien Loong	Lee Hsien Loong	12 August 2004 – 15 May 2024
Senior Minister	Teo Chee Hean	Teo Chee Hean	1 May 2019 – 22 May 2025
Coordinating Minister for National Security	Teo Chee Hean	Teo Chee Hean	21 May 2011 – 22 May 2025
Senior Minister	Tharman Shanmugaratnam	Tharman Shanmugaratnam	1 May 2019 – 7 July 2023
Coordinating Minister for Social Policies	Tharman Shanmugaratnam	Tharman Shanmugaratnam	1 May 2019 – 7 July 2023
Deputy Prime Minister	Heng Swee Keat	Heng Swee Keat	1 May 2019 – 22 May 2025
Minister for Finance	Heng Swee Keat	Heng Swee Keat	1 October 2015 – 14 May 2021
Coordinating Minister for Infrastructure	Khaw Boon Wan	Khaw Boon Wan	1 October 2015 – 26 July 2020
Minister for Transport	Khaw Boon Wan	Khaw Boon Wan	1 October 2015 – 26 July 2020
Minister for Defence	Ng Eng Hen	Ng Eng Hen	21 May 2011 – 22 May 2025
Minister for Foreign Affairs	Vivian Balakrishnan	Vivian Balakrishnan	1 October 2015 – present
Minister for Home Affairs	K. Shanmugam	K. Shanmugam	1 October 2015 – present
Minister for Law	K. Shanmugam	K. Shanmugam	1 May 2008 – 22 May 2025
Minister for Health	Gan Kim Yong	Gan Kim Yong	21 May 2011 – 14 May 2021
Minister for Communications and Information	S. Iswaran	S. Iswaran	1 May 2018 – 14 May 2021
Minister-in-charge of Trade Relations	S. Iswaran	S. Iswaran	1 May 2018 – 18 January 2024
Minister for Culture, Community and Youth	Grace Fu	Grace Fu	1 October 2015 – 26 July 2020
Minister for Trade and Industry	Chan Chun Sing	Chan Chun Sing	1 May 2018 – 14 May 2021
Minister for National Development	Lawrence Wong	Lawrence Wong	1 October 2015 – 26 July 2020
Second Minister for Finance	Lawrence Wong	Lawrence Wong	22 August 2016 – 14 May 2021
Minister for the Environment and Water Resources	Masagos Zulkifli	Masagos Zulkifli	1 October 2015 – 26 July 2020
Minister-in-charge of Muslim Affairs	Masagos Zulkifli	Masagos Zulkifli	1 May 2018 – 22 May 2025
Minister in the Prime Minister's Office	Ng Chee Meng	Ng Chee Meng	1 May 2018 – 26 July 2020
Minister for Education	Ong Ye Kung	Ong Ye Kung	1 May 2018 – 26 July 2020
Minister for Manpower		Josephine Teo	1 May 2018 – 14 May 2021
Second Minister for Home Affairs		Josephine Teo	11 September 2017 – 22 May 2025
Minister for Social and Family Development		Desmond Lee	11 September 2017 – 26 July 2020
Second Minister for National Development		Desmond Lee	1 May 2017 – 26 July 2020
Minister in the Prime Minister's Office		Indranee Rajah	1 May 2018 – present
Second Minister for Finance		Indranee Rajah	1 May 2018 – present
Second Minister for Education		Indranee Rajah	1 May 2018 – 26 July 2020

== List of office holders ==
The following is the list of office holders in the Fourth Lee Hsien Loong Cabinet. Cabinet members are listed in bold.

Prime Minister's Office
Office	Name	Term start	Term end
Prime Minister	**Lee Hsien Loong**	1 October 2015	26 July 2020
Senior Minister	**Teo Chee Hean**	1 May 2019	26 July 2020
Senior Minister	**Tharman Shanmugaratnam**	1 May 2019	26 July 2020
Deputy Prime Minister	**Teo Chee Hean**	1 October 2015	30 April 2019
Deputy Prime Minister	**Tharman Shanmugaratnam**	1 October 2015	30 April 2019
Deputy Prime Minister	**Heng Swee Keat**	1 May 2019	26 July 2020
Coordinating Minister for National Security	**Teo Chee Hean**	1 October 2015	26 July 2020
Coordinating Minister for Economic and Social Policies	**Tharman Shanmugaratnam**	1 October 2015	30 April 2019
Coordinating Minister for Social Policies	**Tharman Shanmugaratnam**	1 May 2019	26 July 2020
Coordinating Minister for Infrastructure	**Khaw Boon Wan**	1 October 2015	26 July 2020
Minister in the Prime Minister's Office	**Chan Chun Sing**	1 October 2015	30 April 2018
Minister in the Prime Minister's Office	**Josephine Teo**	1 May 2017	30 April 2018
Minister in the Prime Minister's Office	**Desmond Lee**	1 May 2017	30 April 2018
Minister in the Prime Minister's Office	**Ng Chee Meng**	1 May 2018	26 July 2020
Minister in the Prime Minister's Office	**Indranee Rajah**	1 May 2018	26 July 2020
Senior Minister of State in the Prime Minister's Office	Heng Chee How	1 October 2015	30 April 2018
Senior Minister of State in the Prime Minister's Office	Josephine Teo	1 October 2015	30 April 2017
Minister of State in the Prime Minister's Office	Sam Tan	1 October 2015	30 April 2018
Ministry of Communications and Information
Office	Name	Term start	Term end
Minister for Communications and Information	**Yaacob Ibrahim** (Note: Yaacob Ibrahim was concurrently the Minister-in-charge of Muslim Affairs until 30 April 2018.)	1 October 2015	30 April 2018
Minister for Communications and Information	**S. Iswaran**	1 May 2018	26 July 2020
Senior Minister of State for Communications and Information	Janil Puthucheary	1 May 2017	26 July 2020
Senior Minister of State for Communications and Information	Chee Hong Tat	1 May 2017	30 April 2018
Senior Minister of State for Communications and Information	Sim Ann	1 May 2018	26 July 2020
Minister of State for Communications and Information	Chee Hong Tat	1 October 2015	30 April 2017
Minister of State for Communications and Information	Janil Puthucheary	1 January 2016	30 April 2017
Ministry of Culture, Community and Youth
Office	Name	Term start	Term end
Minister for Culture, Community and Youth	**Grace Fu**	1 October 2015	26 July 2020
Senior Minister of State for Culture, Community and Youth	Sim Ann	1 October 2015	26 July 2020
Senior Parliamentary Secretary for Culture, Community and Youth	Baey Yam Keng	1 May 2018	26 July 2020
Parliamentary Secretary for Culture, Community and Youth	Baey Yam Keng	1 October 2015	30 April 2018
Ministry of Defence
Office	Name	Term start	Term end
Minister for Defence	**Ng Eng Hen**	1 October 2015	26 July 2020
Second Minister for Defence	**Ong Ye Kung**	1 November 2016	30 April 2018
Senior Minister of State for Defence	Maliki Osman	1 October 2015	26 July 2020
Senior Minister of State for Defence	Ong Ye Kung	1 October 2015	31 October 2016
Senior Minister of State for Defence	Heng Chee How	1 May 2018	26 July 2020
Ministry of Education
Office	Name	Term start	Term end
Minister for Education (Schools)	**Ng Chee Meng** (Note: In an acting capacity until 31 October 2016.)	1 October 2015	30 April 2018
Minister for Education (Higher Education and Skills)	**Ong Ye Kung**	1 October 2015	30 April 2018
Minister for Education	**Ong Ye Kung**	1 May 2018	26 July 2020
Second Minister for Education	**Indranee Rajah**	1 May 2018	26 July 2020
Senior Minister of State for Education	Janil Puthucheary	1 May 2017	30 April 2018
Senior Minister of State for Education	Chee Hong Tat	1 May 2018	26 July 2020
Minister of State for Education	Janil Puthucheary	1 January 2016	30 April 2017
Senior Parliamentary Secretary for Education	Low Yen Ling	1 May 2017	26 July 2020
Senior Parliamentary Secretary for Education	Faishal Ibrahim	1 May 2017	26 July 2020
Parliamentary Secretary for Education	Faishal Ibrahim	1 October 2015	30 April 2017
Parliamentary Secretary for Education	Low Yen Ling	1 October 2015	30 April 2017
Ministry of the Environment and Water Resources
Office	Name	Term start	Term end
Minister for the Environment and Water Resources	**Masagos Zulkifli** (Note: Masagos Zulkifli was concurrently the Minister-in-charge of Muslim Affairs from 1 May 2018.)	1 October 2015	26 July 2020
Senior Minister of State for the Environment	Amy Khor	1 October 2015	26 July 2020
Ministry of Finance
Office	Name	Term start	Term end
Minister for Finance	**Heng Swee Keat**	1 October 2015	26 July 2020
Second Minister for Finance	**Lawrence Wong**	22 August 2016	26 July 2020
Second Minister for Finance	**Indranee Rajah**	1 May 2018	26 July 2020
Senior Minister of State for Finance	Indranee Rajah	1 October 2015	30 April 2018
Senior Minister of State for Finance	Sim Ann	1 October 2015	21 August 2016
Ministry of Foreign Affairs
Office	Name	Term start	Term end
Minister for Foreign Affairs	**Vivian Balakrishnan**	1 October 2015	26 July 2020
Second Minister for Foreign Affairs	**Josephine Teo**	1 May 2017	10 September 2017
Senior Minister of State for Foreign Affairs	Josephine Teo	1 October 2015	30 April 2017
Senior Minister of State for Foreign Affairs	Maliki Osman	1 October 2015	26 July 2020
Minister of State for Foreign Affairs	Sam Tan	1 May 2017	26 July 2020
Senior Parliamentary Secretary for Foreign Affairs	Tan Wu Meng	1 May 2018	26 July 2020
Ministry of Health
Office	Name	Term start	Term end
Minister for Health	**Gan Kim Yong**	1 October 2015	26 July 2020
Senior Minister of State for Health	Amy Khor	1 October 2015	26 July 2020
Senior Minister of State for Health	Lam Pin Min	1 May 2017	26 July 2020
Senior Minister of State for Health	Chee Hong Tat	1 May 2017	30 April 2018
Minister of State for Health	Lam Pin Min	1 October 2015	30 April 2017
Minister of State for Health	Chee Hong Tat	1 October 2015	30 April 2017
Senior Parliamentary Secretary for Health	Amrin Amin	1 May 2018	26 July 2020
Parliamentary Secretary for Health	Amrin Amin	1 May 2017	30 April 2018
Ministry of Home Affairs
Office	Name	Term start	Term end
Minister for Home Affairs	**K. Shanmugam**	1 October 2015	26 July 2020
Second Minister for Home Affairs	**Desmond Lee**	1 May 2017	10 September 2017
Second Minister for Home Affairs	**Josephine Teo**	11 September 2017	26 July 2020
Senior Minister of State for Home Affairs	Desmond Lee	1 October 2015	30 April 2017
Senior Parliamentary Secretary for Home Affairs	Amrin Amin	1 May 2018	26 July 2020
Senior Parliamentary Secretary for Home Affairs	Sun Xueling	1 May 2018	26 July 2020
Parliamentary Secretary for Home Affairs	Amrin Amin	1 October 2015	30 April 2018
Ministry of Law
Office	Name	Term start	Term end
Minister for Law	**K. Shanmugam**	1 October 2015	26 July 2020
Second Minister for Law	**Indranee Rajah**	1 May 2018	30 June 2018
Senior Minister of State for Law	Indranee Rajah	1 October 2015	30 April 2018
Senior Minister of State for Law	Edwin Tong	1 July 2018	26 July 2020
Minister for Manpower
Office	Name	Term start	Term end
Minister for Manpower	**Lim Swee Say**	1 October 2015	30 April 2018
Minister for Manpower	**Josephine Teo**	1 May 2018	26 July 2020
Second Minister for Manpower	**Josephine Teo**	1 May 2017	30 April 2018
Minister of State for Manpower	Teo Ser Luck	1 October 2015	29 June 2017
Minister of State for Manpower	Sam Tan	1 October 2015	30 April 2018
Minister of State for Manpower	Zaqy Mohamad	1 May 2018	26 July 2020
Senior Parliamentary Secretary for Manpower	Low Yen Ling	1 May 2018	26 July 2020
Ministry of National Development
Office	Name	Term start	Term end
Minister for National Development	**Lawrence Wong**	1 October 2015	26 July 2020
Second Minister for National Development	**Desmond Lee**	1 May 2017	26 July 2020
Senior Minister of State for National Development	Desmond Lee	1 October 2015	30 April 2017
Senior Minister of State for National Development	Koh Poh Koon	1 May 2017	30 April 2018
Minister of State for National Development	Koh Poh Koon	1 January 2016	30 April 2017
Minister of State for National Development	Zaqy Mohamad	1 May 2018	26 July 2020
Senior Parliamentary Secretary for National Development	Sun Xueling	1 May 2018	26 July 2020
Minister for Social and Family Development
Office	Name	Term start	Term end
Minister for Social and Family Development	**Tan Chuan-Jin**	1 October 2015	10 September 2017
Minister for Social and Family Development	**Desmond Lee**	11 September 2017	26 July 2020
Minister of State for Social and Family Development	Sam Tan	1 May 2018	26 July 2020
Senior Parliamentary Secretary for Social and Family Development	Faishal Ibrahim	1 May 2017	26 July 2020
Parliamentary Secretary for Social and Family Development	Faishal Ibrahim	1 October 2015	30 April 2017
Ministry of Trade and Industry
Office	Name	Term start	Term end
Minister for Trade and Industry (Trade)	**Lim Hng Kiang**	1 October 2015	30 April 2018
Minister for Trade and Industry (Industry)	**S. Iswaran**	1 October 2015	30 April 2018
Minister for Trade and Industry	**Chan Chun Sing**	1 May 2018	26 July 2020
Minister-in-charge of Trade Relations	**S. Iswaran**	1 May 2018	26 July 2020
Senior Minister of State for Trade and Industry	Sim Ann	22 August 2016	30 April 2018
Senior Minister of State for Trade and Industry	Koh Poh Koon	1 May 2017	26 July 2020
Senior Minister of State for Trade and Industry	Chee Hong Tat	1 May 2018	26 July 2020
Minister of State for Trade and Industry	Koh Poh Koon	1 January 2016	30 April 2017
Senior Parliamentary Secretary for Trade and Industry	Low Yen Ling	1 May 2017	30 April 2018
Senior Parliamentary Secretary for Trade and Industry	Tan Wu Meng	1 May 2018	26 July 2020
Parliamentary Secretary for Trade and Industry	Low Yen Ling	1 October 2015	30 April 2017
Ministry of Transport
Office	Name	Term start	Term end
Minister for Transport	**Khaw Boon Wan**	1 October 2015	26 July 2020
Second Minister for Transport	**Ng Chee Meng**	1 November 2016	30 April 2018
Senior Minister of State for Transport	Josephine Teo	1 October 2015	30 April 2017
Senior Minister of State for Transport	Ng Chee Meng	1 October 2015	26 July 2020
Senior Minister of State for Transport	Lam Pin Min	1 May 2017	26 July 2020
Senior Minister of State for Transport	Janil Puthucheary	1 May 2018	26 July 2020
Senior Parliamentary Secretary for Transport	Baey Yam Keng	1 May 2018	26 July 2020
