= Coordinating Minister for Social Policies =

Appointment in the Cabinet of Singapore

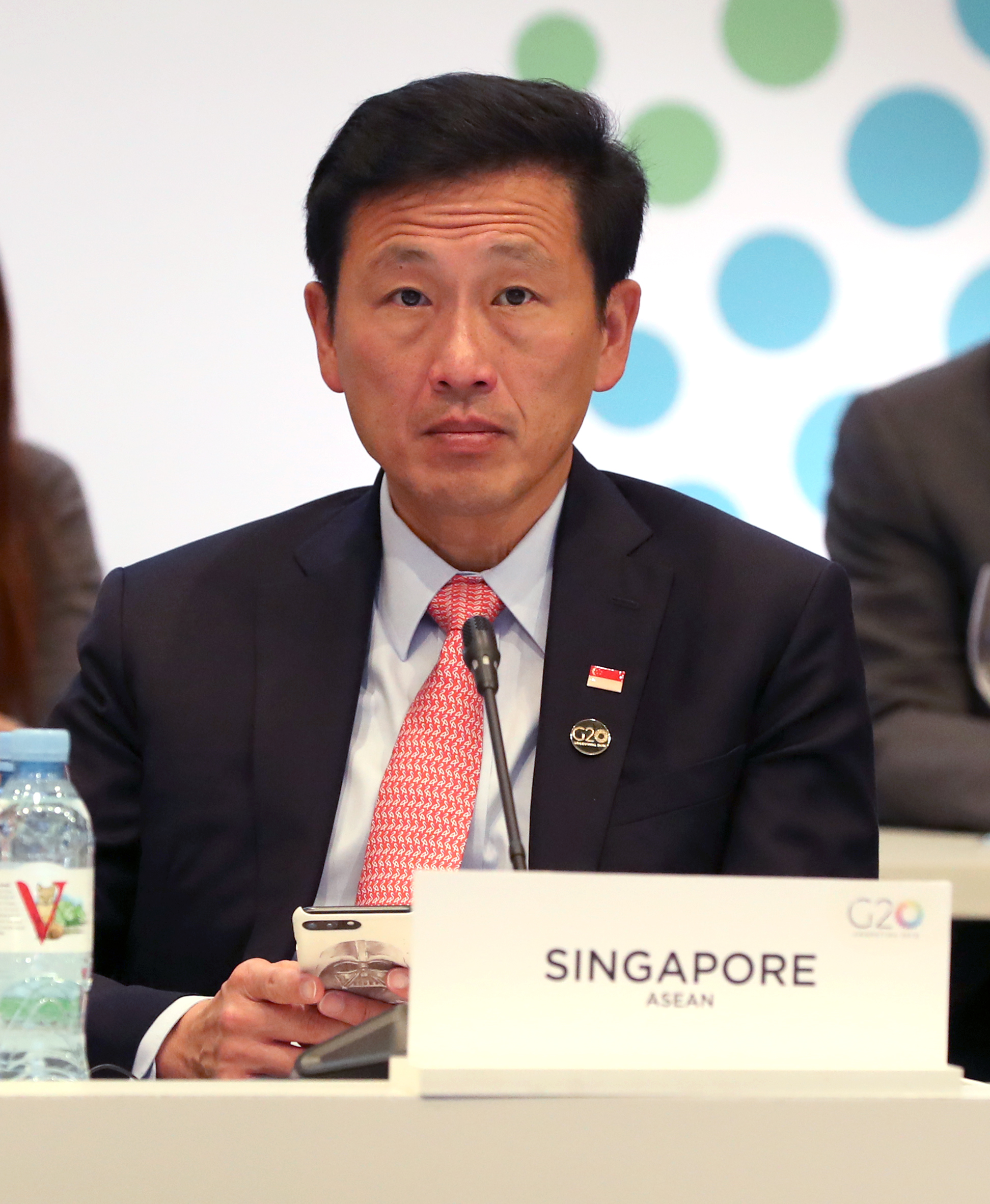
- Incumbent; Ong Ye Kung since 23 May 2025
- Member of: Cabinet of Singapore; Parliament of Singapore
- Reports to: Prime Minister of Singapore
- Appointer: Prime Minister of Singapore
- Term length: At the Prime Minister's pleasure
- Formation: 1 October 2015; 11 years ago (as Coordinating Minister for Economic and Social Policies)
- First holder: Tharman Shanmugaratnam

The Coordinating Minister for Social Policies is an appointment in the Cabinet of Singapore, initially introduced in 2015 as the Coordinating Minister for Economic and Social Policies to cover both economic and social policies. However, the economic policy portfolio was dropped when the role was redesignated in 2019. Before resigning on 7 July 2023 from all his positions in the government and as a member of the People's Action Party to run for the non-partisan presidency, which preceded the abolition of the role, Tharman Shanmugaratnam had held the role since its creation.

The role returned in 2025 under the Second Lawrence Wong Cabinet when Prime Minister Lawrence Wong appointed Minister for Health Ong Ye Kung as the new Coordinating Minister for Social Policies.

== List of officeholders ==
The Coordinating Minister for Social Policies was appointed as part of the Cabinet of Singapore. The incumbent Minister is Ong Ye Kung, an MP for Sembawang GRC from the governing People's Action Party.

=== Coordinating Minister for Economic and Social Policies (2015–2019) ===
Minister	Took office	Left office	Party	Cabinet
Tharman Shanmugaratnam; MP for Jurong GRC (born 1957)	1 October 2015	30 April 2019	PAP	Lee H. IV

=== Coordinating Minister for Social Policies (from 2019) ===
Minister	Took office	Left office	Party	Cabinet
Tharman Shanmugaratnam; MP for Jurong GRC (born 1957)	1 May 2019	7 July 2023	PAP	Lee H. IV
Tharman Shanmugaratnam; MP for Jurong GRC (born 1957)	1 May 2019	7 July 2023	PAP	Lee H. V
Vacant (8 July 2023–22 May 2025)				Lee H. V
Vacant (8 July 2023–22 May 2025)				Wong I
Ong Ye Kung; MP for Sembawang GRC (born 1969)	23 May 2025	Incumbent	PAP	Wong II

== See also ==
- Coordinating Minister for Economic Policies
- Coordinating Minister for National Security
- Minister-in-Charge of Muslim Affairs
