= Ministry of Social and Family Development =

Singaporean government ministry

Agency overview
- Formed: 1 November 2012; 14 years ago
- Preceding agency: Ministry of Community Development, Youth and Sports
- Jurisdiction: Government of Singapore
- Headquarters: MSF Building, 512 Thomson Road, Singapore 298136
- Motto: Passion for People
- Employees: 1930 (2019)
- Annual budget: ▲ S$3 billion (2019)
- Ministers responsible: Masagos Zulkifli, Minister; Desmond Lee, Minister-in-charge of Social Services Integration; Goh Pei Ming, Senior Minister of State; Eric Chua, Senior Parliamentary Secretary
- Agency executives: Aubeck Kam, Permanent Secretary; Ng How Yue, Permanent Secretary (Development); Jason Chen, Deputy Secretary (Opportunity & Resilience); Ong Ai Hua, Deputy Secretary (Family & Society); Esa Masood, Deputy Secretary (Corporate & Partners)
- Child agencies: Early Childhood Development Agency; National Council of Social Service; National Council on Problem Gambling
- Website: www.msf.gov.sg
- Agency ID: T08GA0010F

The Ministry of Social and Family Development (MSF; Malay: Kementerian Pembangunan Sosial dan Keluarga; Chinese: 社会及家庭发展部; Tamil: சமுதாய, குடும்ப மேம்பாட்டு அமைச்சு) is a ministry of the Government of Singapore responsible for the formulation and implementation of policies related to the community infrastructure, programmes and services in Singapore.

== History ==
MSF was formed on 1 November 2012, after it was announced on 31 July 2012 that the Ministry of Community Development, Youth and Sports would be restructured. Several portfolios, including youth and sports development, charity governance and REACH, the Government's feedback unit, were taken over by two other new Ministries - Ministry of Culture, Community and Youth and Ministry of Communications and Information.

== Responsibilities ==
One of MSF's immediate priorities was to re-examine public policies to help get Singaporeans to marry and have their first child earlier. In addition, MSF would work on strengthening the social safety net to better help those in need, especially those who are at risk.

== Statutory Boards ==
- National Council of Social Service
- National Council on Problem Gambling

== Impact ==
In June 2018, the Save The Children organisation's End of Childhood report ranked Singapore as the best country for children to grow up in. Its ranking methodology is based on eight indicators - under-five mortality rate, child stunting, out-of-school children and youth, child labour, child marriage, adolescent birth rate, child homicide rate and population displaced by conflict.

== Ministers ==
The Ministry is headed by the Minister for Social and Family Development, who is appointed as part of the Cabinet of Singapore. The incubment Minister is Masagos Zulkifli, an MP for Tampines GRC from the People's Action Party.

Minister	Took office	Left office	Party	Cabinet
Chan Chun Sing (Note: Chan Chun Sing served as acting minister from 1 November 2012 until 31 August 2013.); MP for Tanjong Pagar GRC (born 1969)	1 November 2012	31 August 2013	PAP	Lee H. III
Chan Chun Sing; MP for Tanjong Pagar GRC (born 1969)	1 September 2013	8 April 2015	PAP	Lee H. III
Tan Chuan-Jin; MP for Marine Parade GRC (born 1969)	9 April 2015	10 September 2017	PAP	Lee H. III
Tan Chuan-Jin; MP for Marine Parade GRC (born 1969)	9 April 2015	10 September 2017	PAP	Lee H. IV
Desmond Lee; MP for Jurong GRC (born 1976)	11 September 2017	26 July 2020	PAP	Lee H. IV
Masagos Zulkifli; MP for Tampines GRC (born 1963)	27 July 2020	Incumbent	PAP	Lee H. V
Masagos Zulkifli; MP for Tampines GRC (born 1963)	27 July 2020	Incumbent	PAP	Wong I
Masagos Zulkifli; MP for Tampines GRC (born 1963)	27 July 2020	Incumbent	PAP	Wong II
