= First Lawrence Wong Cabinet =

Cabinet of Singapore from 2024 to 2025

- 18th Cabinet of Singapore
- 2024–2025
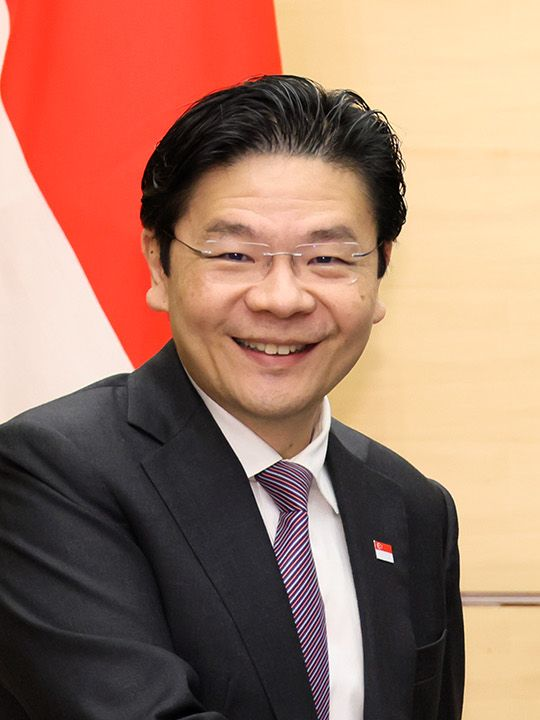
- Date formed: 15 May 2024
- Date dissolved: 22 May 2025

People and organisations
- Head of state: Tharman Shanmugaratnam
- Deputy head of government: Gan Kim Yong; Heng Swee Keat
- No. of ministers: 20
- Member party: People's Action Party
- Status in legislature: Supermajority
- Opposition party: Workers' Party; Progress Singapore Party
- Opposition leader: Pritam Singh

History
- Legislature term: 14th
- Predecessor: Fifth Lee Hsien Loong Cabinet
- Successor: Second Lawrence Wong Cabinet

The First Cabinet of Lawrence Wong of the Government of Singapore was announced on 13 May 2024, and came into effect on 15 May 2024 and ended on 23 May 2025.

== Changes ==
There are minimal changes to the Cabinet line-up following the swearing-in of Lawrence Wong as Prime Minister. Minister for Trade and Industry Gan Kim Yong was promoted to Deputy Prime Minister, while retaining his existing ministerial role.

Ministers	Appointment
Gan Kim Yong	Deputy Prime Minister and Minister for Trade and Industry

== Cabinet ==
The First Lawrence Wong Cabinet is composed of the following members. On 16 April 2024, then Prime Minister-designate Lawrence Wong announced that then outgoing Prime Minister Lee Hsien Loong would assume the office of Senior Minister and stay on in his cabinet after stepping down as the Prime Minister on 15 May 2024.

The cabinet was composed of the following members.

Portfolio	Portrait	Name	Term
Prime Minister	Lawrence Wong	Lawrence Wong	15 May 2024 – present
Minister for Finance	Lawrence Wong	Lawrence Wong	15 May 2021 – present
Senior Minister	Lee Hsien Loong	Lee Hsien Loong	15 May 2024 – present
Deputy Prime Minister	Gan Kim Yong	Gan Kim Yong	15 May 2024 – present
Minister for Trade and Industry	Gan Kim Yong	Gan Kim Yong	15 May 2021 – 26 July 2026
Deputy Prime Minister	Heng Swee Keat	Heng Swee Keat	1 May 2019 – 22 May 2025
Senior Minister	Teo Chee Hean	Teo Chee Hean	1 May 2019 – 22 May 2025
Coordinating Minister for National Security	Teo Chee Hean	Teo Chee Hean	21 May 2011 – 22 May 2025
Minister for Defence	Ng Eng Hen	Ng Eng Hen	21 May 2011 – 22 May 2025
Minister for Foreign Affairs	Vivian Balakrishnan	Vivian Balakrishnan	1 October 2015 – present
Minister for Home Affairs	K. Shanmugam	K. Shanmugam	1 October 2015 – present
Minister for Law	K. Shanmugam	K. Shanmugam	1 May 2008 – 22 May 2025
Minister for Sustainability and the Environment	Grace Fu	Grace Fu	27 July 2020 – present
Minister-in-charge of Trade Relations	Grace Fu	Grace Fu	18 January 2024 – present
Minister for Education	Chan Chun Sing	Chan Chun Sing	15 May 2021 – 22 May 2025
Minister for Social and Family Development	Masagos Zulkifli	Masagos Zulkifli	27 July 2020 – present
Second Minister for Health	Masagos Zulkifli	Masagos Zulkifli	27 July 2020 – 22 May 2025
Minister-in-charge of Muslim Affairs	Masagos Zulkifli	Masagos Zulkifli	1 May 2018 – 22 May 2025
Minister for Health	Ong Ye Kung	Ong Ye Kung	15 May 2021 – present
Minister for National Development		Desmond Lee	27 July 2020 – 22 May 2025
Minister-in-charge of Social Service Integration		Desmond Lee	27 July 2020 – present
Minister for Communications and Information		Josephine Teo	15 May 2021 – 7 July 2024
Minister for Digital Development and Information		Josephine Teo	8 July 2024 – present
Second Minister for Home Affairs		Josephine Teo	11 September 2017 – 22 May 2025
Minister in the Prime Minister's Office		Indranee Rajah	1 May 2018 – present
Second Minister for Finance		Indranee Rajah	1 May 2018 – present
Second Minister for National Development		Indranee Rajah	27 July 2020 – present
Minister in the Prime Minister's Office		Maliki Osman	27 July 2020 – 22 May 2025
Second Minister for Education		Maliki Osman	27 July 2020 – 22 May 2025
Second Minister for Foreign Affairs		Maliki Osman	27 July 2020 – 22 May 2025
Minister for Culture, Community and Youth		Edwin Tong	27 July 2020 – 22 May 2025
Second Minister for Law		Edwin Tong	27 July 2020 – 22 May 2025
Minister for Manpower	Tan See Leng	Tan See Leng	15 May 2021 – 26 July 2026
Second Minister for Trade and Industry	Tan See Leng	Tan See Leng	27 July 2020 – 22 May 2025
Minister for Transport	Chee Hong Tat	Chee Hong Tat	18 January 2024 – 22 May 2025
Second Minister for Finance	Chee Hong Tat	Chee Hong Tat	18 January 2024 – 22 May 2025

== List of office holders ==
The following is the list of office holders in the First Lawrence Wong Cabinet. Cabinet members are listed in bold.

Prime Minister's Office
Office	Name	Term start	Term end
Prime Minister	**Lawrence Wong**	15 May 2024	22 May 2025
Senior Minister	**Lee Hsien Loong**	15 May 2024	22 May 2025
Senior Minister	**Teo Chee Hean**	15 May 2024	22 May 2025
Deputy Prime Minister	**Gan Kim Yong**	15 May 2024	22 May 2025
Deputy Prime Minister	**Heng Swee Keat**	15 May 2024	22 May 2025
Coordinating Minister for National Security	**Teo Chee Hean**	15 May 2024	22 May 2025
Minister in the Prime Minister's Office	**Indranee Rajah**	15 May 2024	22 May 2025
Minister in the Prime Minister's Office	**Maliki Osman**	15 May 2024	22 May 2025
Senior Minister of State in the Prime Minister's Office	Desmond Tan	15 May 2024	22 May 2025
Ministry of Communications and Information (until 7 July 2024)
Office	Name	Term start	Term end
Minister for Communications and Information	**Josephine Teo**	15 May 2024	7 July 2024
Senior Minister of State for Communications and Information	Janil Puthucheary	15 May 2024	7 July 2024
Senior Minister of State for Communications and Information	Tan Kiat How	15 May 2024	7 July 2024
Minister of State for Communications and Information	Rahayu Mahzam	15 May 2024	7 July 2024
Ministry of Culture, Community and Youth
Office	Name	Term start	Term end
Minister for Culture, Community and Youth	**Edwin Tong**	15 May 2024	22 May 2025
Senior Minister of State for Culture, Community and Youth	Low Yen Ling	15 May 2024	22 May 2025
Minister of State for Culture, Community and Youth	Alvin Tan	15 May 2024	22 May 2025
Senior Parliamentary Secretary for Culture, Community and Youth	Eric Chua	15 May 2024	22 May 2025
Ministry of Defence
Office	Name	Term start	Term end
Minister for Defence	**Ng Eng Hen**	15 May 2024	22 May 2025
Senior Minister of State for Defence	Heng Chee How	15 May 2024	22 May 2025
Senior Minister of State for Defence	Zaqy Mohamad	15 May 2024	22 May 2025
Ministry of Digital Development and Information (from 8 July 2024)
Office	Name	Term start	Term end
Minister for Digital Development and Information	**Josephine Teo**	8 July 2024	22 May 2025
Senior Minister of State for Digital Development and Information	Janil Puthucheary	8 July 2024	22 May 2025
Senior Minister of State for Digital Development and Information	Tan Kiat How	8 July 2024	22 May 2025
Minister of State for Digital Development and Information	Rahayu Mahzam	8 July 2024	22 May 2025
Ministry of Education
Office	Name	Term start	Term end
Minister for Education	**Chan Chun Sing**	15 May 2024	22 May 2025
Second Minister for Education	**Maliki Osman**	15 May 2024	22 May 2025
Minister of State for Education	Gan Siow Huang	15 May 2024	22 May 2025
Senior Parliamentary Secretary for Education	Shawn Huang	15 May 2024	22 May 2025
Ministry of Finance
Office	Name	Term start	Term end
Minister for Finance	**Lawrence Wong**	15 May 2024	22 May 2025
Second Minister for Finance	**Indranee Rajah**	15 May 2024	22 May 2025
Second Minister for Finance	**Chee Hong Tat**	15 May 2024	22 May 2025
Senior Parliamentary Secretary for Finance	Shawn Huang	15 May 2024	22 May 2025
Ministry of Foreign Affairs
Office	Name	Term start	Term end
Minister for Foreign Affairs	**Vivian Balakrishnan**	15 May 2024	22 May 2025
Second Minister for Foreign Affairs	**Maliki Osman**	15 May 2024	22 May 2025
Senior Minister of State for Foreign Affairs	Sim Ann	15 May 2024	22 May 2025
Ministry of Health
Office	Name	Term start	Term end
Minister for Health	**Ong Ye Kung**	15 May 2024	22 May 2025
Second Minister for Health	**Masagos Zulkifli** (Note: Masagos Zulkifli was concurrently the Minister-in-charge of Muslim Affairs.)	15 May 2024	22 May 2025
Senior Minister of State for Health	Janil Puthucheary	15 May 2024	22 May 2025
Minister of State for Health	Rahayu Mahzam	15 May 2024	22 May 2025
Ministry of Home Affairs
Office	Name	Term start	Term end
Minister for Home Affairs	**K. Shanmugam**	15 May 2024	22 May 2025
Second Minister for Home Affairs	**Josephine Teo**	15 May 2024	22 May 2025
Minister of State for Home Affairs	Faishal Ibrahim	15 May 2024	22 May 2025
Minister of State for Home Affairs	Sun Xueling	15 May 2024	22 May 2025
Ministry of Law
Office	Name	Term start	Term end
Minister for Law	**K. Shanmugam**	15 May 2024	22 May 2025
Second Minister for Law	**Edwin Tong**	15 May 2024	22 May 2025
Minister of State for Law	Murali Pillai	1 July 2024	22 May 2025
Minister for Manpower
Office	Name	Term start	Term end
Minister for Manpower	**Tan See Leng**	15 May 2024	22 May 2025
Senior Minister of State for Manpower	Koh Poh Koon	15 May 2024	22 May 2025
Senior Minister of State for Manpower	Zaqy Mohamad	15 May 2024	22 May 2025
Minister of State for Manpower	Gan Siow Huang	15 May 2024	22 May 2025
Ministry of National Development
Office	Name	Term start	Term end
Minister for National Development	**Desmond Lee**	15 May 2024	22 May 2025
Second Minister for National Development	**Indranee Rajah**	15 May 2024	22 May 2025
Senior Minister of State for National Development	Sim Ann	15 May 2024	22 May 2025
Senior Minister of State for National Development	Tan Kiat How	15 May 2024	22 May 2025
Minister of State for National Development	Faishal Ibrahim	15 May 2024	22 May 2025
Ministry of Social and Family Development
Office	Name	Term start	Term end
Minister for Social and Family Development	**Masagos Zulkifli**	15 May 2024	22 May 2025
Minister-in-charge of Social Service Integration	**Desmond Lee**	15 May 2024	22 May 2025
Minister of State for Social and Family Development	Sun Xueling	15 May 2024	22 May 2025
Senior Parliamentary Secretary for Social and Family Development	Eric Chua	15 May 2024	22 May 2025
Ministry of Sustainability and the Environment
Office	Name	Term start	Term end
Minister for Sustainability and the Environment	**Grace Fu**	15 May 2024	22 May 2025
Senior Minister of State for Sustainability and the Environment	Amy Khor	15 May 2024	22 May 2025
Senior Minister of State for Sustainability and the Environment	Koh Poh Koon	15 May 2024	22 May 2025
Senior Parliamentary Secretary for Sustainability and the Environment	Baey Yam Keng	13 June 2022	15 May 2024
Ministry of Trade and Industry
Office	Name	Term start	Term end
Minister for Trade and Industry	**Gan Kim Yong**	15 May 2024	22 May 2025
Minister-in-charge of Trade Relations	**Grace Fu**	15 May 2024	22 May 2025
Second Minister for Trade and Industry	**Tan See Leng**	15 May 2024	22 May 2025
Senior Minister of State for Trade and Industry	Low Yen Ling	15 May 2024	22 May 2025
Minister of State for Trade and Industry	Alvin Tan	15 May 2024	22 May 2025
Ministry of Transport
Office	Name	Term start	Term end
Minister for Transport	**Chee Hong Tat**	15 May 2024	22 May 2025
Senior Minister of State for Transport	Amy Khor	15 May 2024	22 May 2025
Minister of State for Transport	Murali Pillai	1 July 2024	22 May 2025
Senior Parliamentary Secretary for Transport	Baey Yam Keng	15 May 2024	22 May 2025
