= Coordinating Minister for National Security (Singapore) =

Appointment in the Cabinet of Singapore

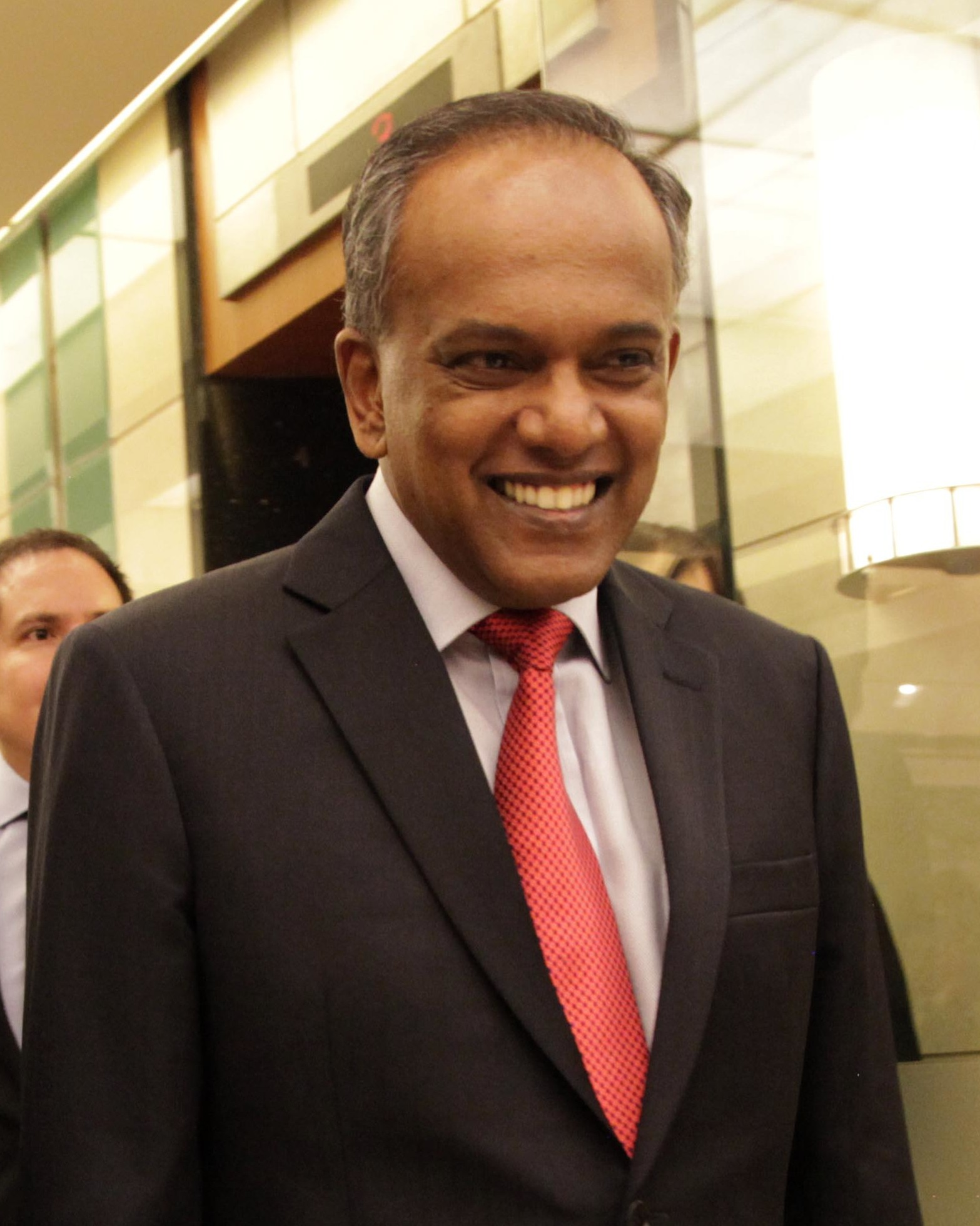
- Incumbent; K. Shanmugam since 23 May 2025
- Member of: Cabinet of Singapore; Parliament of Singapore
- Reports to: Prime Minister of Singapore
- Appointer: Prime Minister of Singapore
- Term length: At the Prime Minister's pleasure
- Formation: 1 August 2003; 23 years ago (as Coordinating Minister for Security and Defence)
- First holder: Tony Tan

The Coordinating Minister for National Security is an appointment in the Cabinet of Singapore, initially introduced as Coordinating Minister for Security and Defence in 2003 to cover both the security and defence of Singapore. However, the security and defence portfolios were dropped when the role was redesignated in 2005.

== History ==
In April 2003, during the change of cabinet of the Fourth Goh Chok Tong Cabinet, the position of the Coordinating Minister for Security and Defence was first introduced. The appointment is to be part of the Prime Minister's Office. The Minister of Defence Tony Tan was appointed as the first Coordinating Minister while Teo Chee Hean took over as Minister of Defence.

In 2005, Tan retired from politics and S. Jayakumar was appointed to take over the role.

On 1 November 2010, Wong Kan Seng was appointed Coordinating Minister for National Security and relinquished his Minister for Home Affairs portfolio. Wong retired from the Cabinet following the 2011 general election.

On 18 May 2011, Teo Chee Hean relinquished his Cabinet portfolio of Minister for Defence and took up the positions of Minister for Home Affairs and Coordinating Minister for National Security, while concurrently serving as Deputy Prime Minister and Minister-in-charge of the Civil Service.

== List of officeholders ==
The Coordinating Minister for National Security is appointed as part of the Cabinet of Singapore. The incumbent Minister is K. Shanmugam, an MP for Nee Soon GRC from the governing People's Action Party.

=== Coordinating Minister for Security and Defence (2003–2005) ===
Minister	Took office	Left office	Party	Cabinet
Tony Tan; MP for Sembawang GRC (born 1940)	1 August 2003	1 September 2005	PAP	Goh IV
Tony Tan; MP for Sembawang GRC (born 1940)	1 August 2003	1 September 2005	PAP	Lee H. I

=== Coordinating Minister for National Security (from 2005) ===
Minister	Took office	Left office	Party	Cabinet
S. Jayakumar; MP for East Coast GRC (born 1939)	1 September 2005	1 November 2010	PAP	Lee H. I
S. Jayakumar; MP for East Coast GRC (born 1939)	1 September 2005	1 November 2010	PAP	Lee H. II
Wong Kan Seng; MP for Bishan–Toa Payoh GRC (born 1946)	1 November 2010	20 May 2011	PAP	Lee H. II
Teo Chee Hean; MP for Pasir Ris–Punggol GRC (born 1954)	21 May 2011	23 May 2025	PAP	Lee H. III
Teo Chee Hean; MP for Pasir Ris–Punggol GRC (born 1954)	21 May 2011	23 May 2025	PAP	Lee H. IV
Teo Chee Hean; MP for Pasir Ris–Punggol GRC (born 1954)	21 May 2011	23 May 2025	PAP	Lee H. V
Teo Chee Hean; MP for Pasir Ris–Punggol GRC (born 1954)	21 May 2011	23 May 2025	PAP	Wong I
K. Shanmugam; MP for Nee Soon GRC (born 1959)	23 May 2025	Incumbent	PAP	Wong II

== See also ==
- Coordinating Minister for Economic Policies
- Coordinating Minister for Social Policies
- Minister-in-Charge of Muslim Affairs
