= Coordinating Minister for Economic Policies =

Position in the Cabinet of Singapore

- Member of: Cabinet of Singapore; Parliament of Singapore
- Reports to: Prime Minister of Singapore
- Appointer: Prime Minister of Singapore
- Term length: At the prime minister's pleasure
- Formation: 1 October 2015; 10 years ago (as Coordinating Minister for Economic and Social Policies)
- First holder: Tharman Shanmugaratnam
- Final holder: Heng Swee Keat

The Coordinating Minister for Economic Policies was an appointment in the Cabinet of Singapore, initially introduced in 2015 to cover both economic and social policies. However, the social policy portfolio was dropped when the role was redesignated in 2019. The last person who held this portfolio was Heng Swee Keat, who stood down after the cabinet reshuffle upon the swearing in of Lawrence Wong as the new prime minister in 2024.

== List of officeholders ==
The Coordinating Minister for Economic Policies was appointed as part of the Cabinet of Singapore.

=== Coordinating Minister for Economic and Social Policies (2015–2019) ===
Minister	Took office	Left office	Party	Cabinet
Tharman Shanmugaratnam; MP for Jurong GRC (born 1957)	1 October 2015	30 April 2019	PAP	Lee H. IV

=== Coordinating Minister for Economic Policies (2020–2024) ===
Minister	Took office	Left office	Party	Cabinet
Heng Swee Keat; MP for East Coast GRC (born 1961)	27 July 2020	15 May 2024	PAP	Lee H. V

== See also ==
- Coordinating Minister for Social Policies
- Coordinating Minister for National Security
- Minister-in-Charge of Muslim Affairs
