= Fifth Lee Hsien Loong Cabinet =

Cabinet of Singapore from 2020 to 2024

- 17th Cabinet of Singapore
- 2020–2024
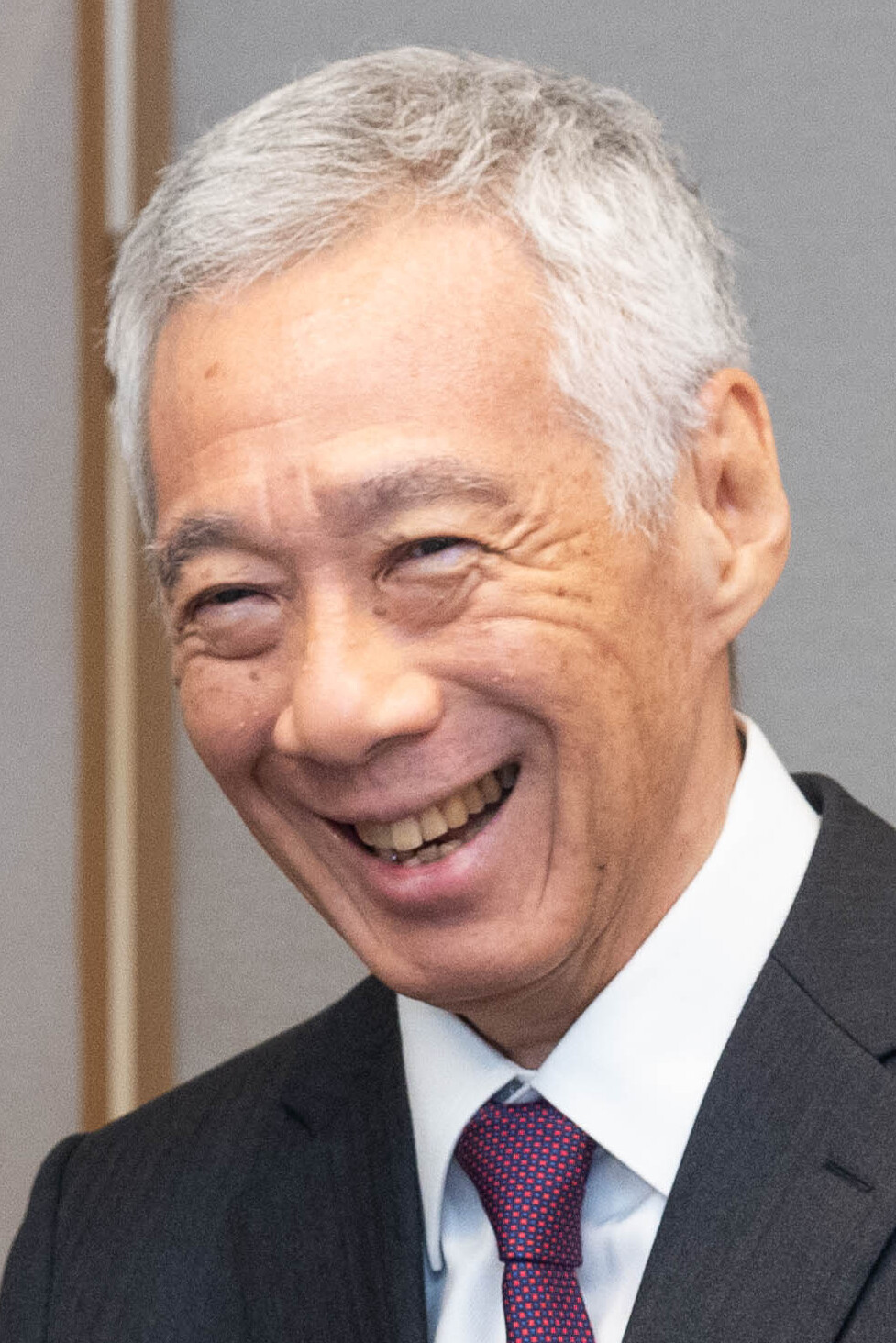
- Date formed: 27 July 2020
- Date dissolved: 15 May 2024

People and organisations
- Head of state: Halimah Yacob (until 13 September 2023); Tharman Shanmugaratnam (from 14 September 2023)
- Head of government: Lee Hsien Loong
- Deputy head of government: Heng Swee Keat; Lawrence Wong (from 13 June 2022)
- No. of ministers: 20
- Member party: People's Action Party
- Status in legislature: Supermajority
- Opposition party: Workers' Party; Progress Singapore Party
- Opposition leader: Pritam Singh

History
- Election: 10 July 2020
- Legislature term: 14th
- Predecessor: Fourth Lee Hsien Loong Cabinet
- Successor: First Lawrence Wong Cabinet

The Fifth Cabinet of Lee Hsien Loong of the Government of Singapore was announced on 25 July 2020 following the 2020 general election on 10 July, and came into effect on 27 July 2020.

== Changes ==
There was one new Minister appointed, with two outgoing Ministers. Khaw Boon Wan retired from politics while Ng Chee Meng stepped down after losing in the 2020 general election.

Ministers	Incoming	Outgoing
Tan See Leng	Minister of Manpower and Second Minister for Trade and Industry	
Khaw Boon Wan		Coordinating Minister for Infrastructure and Minister at Ministry of Transport (Singapore)
Ng Chee Meng		Minister in the Prime Minister's Office

== Cabinet ==
=== July 2020 – May 2021 ===
The list of Cabinet ministers and other office holders was announced on 25 July 2020. In a press conference, Prime Minister Lee Hsien Loong said, "I'm rotating the ministers, especially the younger ones, to gain exposure and experience. We regularly do this during Cabinet shuffles, and the intent is to expose the office-holders to different portfolios to gain both breadth and depth to understand the intricacies of the issues, and to see things from different perspectives."

The cabinet consisted of the following members from 27 July 2020.

Portfolio	Portrait	Name	Term
Prime Minister	Lee Hsien Loong	Lee Hsien Loong	12 August 2004 – 15 May 2024
Deputy Prime Minister	Heng Swee Keat	Heng Swee Keat	1 May 2019 – 22 May 2025
Coordinating Minister for Economic Policies	Heng Swee Keat	Heng Swee Keat	27 July 2020 – 15 May 2024
Minister for Finance	Heng Swee Keat	Heng Swee Keat	1 October 2015 – 14 May 2021
Senior Minister	Teo Chee Hean	Teo Chee Hean	1 May 2019 – 22 May 2025
Coordinating Minister for National Security	Teo Chee Hean	Teo Chee Hean	21 May 2011 – 22 May 2025
Senior Minister	Tharman Shanmugaratnam	Tharman Shanmugaratnam	1 May 2019 – 7 July 2023
Coordinating Minister for Social Policies	Tharman Shanmugaratnam	Tharman Shanmugaratnam	1 May 2019 – 7 July 2023
Minister for Defence	Ng Eng Hen	Ng Eng Hen	21 May 2011 – 22 May 2025
Minister for Foreign Affairs	Vivian Balakrishnan	Vivian Balakrishnan	1 October 2015 – present
Minister for Home Affairs	K. Shanmugam	K. Shanmugam	1 October 2015 – present
Minister for Law	K. Shanmugam	K. Shanmugam	1 May 2008 – 22 May 2025
Minister for Health	Gan Kim Yong	Gan Kim Yong	21 May 2011 – 14 May 2021
Minister for Communications and Information	S. Iswaran	S. Iswaran	1 May 2018 – 14 May 2021
Minister-in-charge of Trade Relations	S. Iswaran	S. Iswaran	1 May 2018 – 18 January 2024
Minister for Sustainability and the Environment	Grace Fu	Grace Fu	27 July 2020 – present
Minister for Trade and Industry	Chan Chun Sing	Chan Chun Sing	1 May 2018 – 14 May 2021
Minister for Education	Lawrence Wong	Lawrence Wong	27 July 2020 – 14 May 2021
Second Minister for Finance	Lawrence Wong	Lawrence Wong	22 August 2016 – 14 May 2021
Minister for Social and Family Development	Masagos Zulkifli	Masagos Zulkifli	27 July 2020 – present
Second Minister for Health	Masagos Zulkifli	Masagos Zulkifli	27 July 2020 – 22 May 2025
Minister-in-charge of Muslim Affairs	Masagos Zulkifli	Masagos Zulkifli	1 May 2018 – 22 May 2025
Minister for Transport	Ong Ye Kung	Ong Ye Kung	27 July 2020 – 14 May 2021
Minister for National Development		Desmond Lee	27 July 2020 – 22 May 2025
Minister-in-charge of Social Services Integration		Desmond Lee	27 July 2020 – present
Minister for Manpower		Josephine Teo	1 May 2018 – 14 May 2021
Second Minister for Home Affairs		Josephine Teo	11 September 2017 – 22 May 2025
Minister in the Prime Minister's Office		Indranee Rajah	1 May 2018 – present
Second Minister for Finance		Indranee Rajah	1 May 2018 – present
Second Minister for National Development		Indranee Rajah	27 July 2020 – present
Minister in the Prime Minister's Office		Maliki Osman	27 July 2020 – 22 May 2025
Second Minister for Education		Maliki Osman	27 July 2020 – 22 May 2025
Second Minister for Foreign Affairs		Maliki Osman	27 July 2020 – 22 May 2025
Minister for Culture, Community and Youth		Edwin Tong	27 July 2020 – 22 May 2025
Second Minister for Law		Edwin Tong	27 July 2020 – 22 May 2025
Minister in the Prime Minister's Office	Tan See Leng	Tan See Leng	27 July 2020 – 14 May 2021
Second Minister for Manpower	Tan See Leng	Tan See Leng	27 July 2020 – 14 May 2021
Second Minister for Trade and Industry	Tan See Leng	Tan See Leng	27 July 2020 – 22 May 2025

=== May 2021 – June 2022 ===
On 8 April 2021, Heng Swee Keat had announced that he was stepping aside as the 4G Leader citing "age" and "health" concerns. He also stated that he would relinquish his finance portfolio in the upcoming Cabinet reshuffle. As such, a Cabinet reshuffle occurred on 23 April 2021 where Lawrence Wong was announced to take over Heng Swee Keat as Finance Minister. 6 other Ministers were also rotated. Heng however continued to stay on as Deputy Prime Minister as well as Coordinating Minister.

The cabinet consisted of the following members from 15 May 2021.

Portfolio	Portrait	Name	Term
Prime Minister	Lee Hsien Loong	Lee Hsien Loong	12 August 2004 – 15 May 2024
Deputy Prime Minister	Heng Swee Keat	Heng Swee Keat	1 May 2019 – 22 May 2025
Coordinating Minister for Economic Policies	Heng Swee Keat	Heng Swee Keat	27 July 2020 – 15 May 2024
Senior Minister	Teo Chee Hean	Teo Chee Hean	1 May 2019 – 22 May 2025
Coordinating Minister for National Security	Teo Chee Hean	Teo Chee Hean	21 May 2011 – 22 May 2025
Senior Minister	Tharman Shanmugaratnam	Tharman Shanmugaratnam	1 May 2019 – 7 July 2023
Coordinating Minister for Social Policies	Tharman Shanmugaratnam	Tharman Shanmugaratnam	1 May 2019 – 7 July 2023
Minister for Defence	Ng Eng Hen	Ng Eng Hen	21 May 2011 – 22 May 2025
Minister for Foreign Affairs	Vivian Balakrishnan	Vivian Balakrishnan	1 October 2015 – present
Minister for Home Affairs	K. Shanmugam	K. Shanmugam	1 October 2015 – present
Minister for Law	K. Shanmugam	K. Shanmugam	1 May 2008 – 22 May 2025
Minister for Trade and Industry	Gan Kim Yong	Gan Kim Yong	15 May 2021 – 26 July 2026
Minister for Transport	S. Iswaran	S. Iswaran	15 May 2021 – 18 January 2024
Minister-in-charge of Trade Relations	S. Iswaran	S. Iswaran	1 May 2018 – 18 January 2024
Minister for Sustainability and the Environment	Grace Fu	Grace Fu	27 July 2020 – present
Minister for Education	Chan Chun Sing	Chan Chun Sing	15 May 2021 – 22 May 2025
Minister for Finance	Lawrence Wong	Lawrence Wong	15 May 2021 – present
Minister for Social and Family Development	Masagos Zulkifli	Masagos Zulkifli	27 July 2020 – present
Second Minister for Health	Masagos Zulkifli	Masagos Zulkifli	27 July 2020 – 22 May 2025
Minister-in-charge of Muslim Affairs	Masagos Zulkifli	Masagos Zulkifli	1 May 2018 – 22 May 2025
Minister for Health	Ong Ye Kung	Ong Ye Kung	15 May 2021 – present
Minister for National Development		Desmond Lee	27 July 2020 – 22 May 2025
Minister-in-charge of Social Services Integration		Desmond Lee	27 July 2020 – present
Minister for Communications and Information		Josephine Teo	15 May 2021 – 7 July 2024
Second Minister for Home Affairs		Josephine Teo	11 September 2017 – 22 May 2025
Minister in the Prime Minister's Office		Indranee Rajah	1 May 2018 – present
Second Minister for Finance		Indranee Rajah	1 May 2018 – present
Second Minister for National Development		Indranee Rajah	27 July 2020 – present
Minister in the Prime Minister's Office		Maliki Osman	27 July 2020 – 22 May 2025
Second Minister for Education		Maliki Osman	27 July 2020 – 22 May 2025
Second Minister for Foreign Affairs		Maliki Osman	27 July 2020 – 22 May 2025
Minister for Culture, Community and Youth		Edwin Tong	27 July 2020 – 22 May 2025
Second Minister for Law		Edwin Tong	27 July 2020 – 22 May 2025
Minister for Manpower	Tan See Leng	Tan See Leng	15 May 2021 – 26 July 2026
Second Minister for Trade and Industry	Tan See Leng	Tan See Leng	27 July 2020 – 22 May 2025

=== June 2022 – January 2024 ===
On 14 April 2022, Lawrence Wong was selected as the next 4G Leader, succeeding Heng Swee Keat. Thus a Cabinet reshuffle was announced on 6 June 2022 and carried out exactly a week later on 13 June 2022 where Lawrence Wong was promoted to Deputy Prime Minister and Acting Prime Minister in the Prime Minister's Absence. Lawrence also assumed responsibility of the Strategy Group in the PMO from Heng Swee Keat.

The cabinet was composed of the following members from 13 June 2022.

Portfolio	Portrait	Name	Term
Prime Minister	Lee Hsien Loong	Lee Hsien Loong	12 August 2004 – 15 May 2024
Deputy Prime Minister	Lawrence Wong	Lawrence Wong	13 June 2022 – 15 May 2024
Minister for Finance	Lawrence Wong	Lawrence Wong	15 May 2021 – present
Deputy Prime Minister	Heng Swee Keat	Heng Swee Keat	1 May 2019 – 22 May 2025
Coordinating Minister for Economic Policies	Heng Swee Keat	Heng Swee Keat	27 July 2020 – 15 May 2024
Senior Minister	Teo Chee Hean	Teo Chee Hean	1 May 2019 – 22 May 2025
Coordinating Minister for National Security	Teo Chee Hean	Teo Chee Hean	21 May 2011 – 22 May 2025
Senior Minister	Tharman Shanmugaratnam	Tharman Shanmugaratnam	1 May 2019 – 7 July 2023
Coordinating Minister for Social Policies	Tharman Shanmugaratnam	Tharman Shanmugaratnam	1 May 2019 – 7 July 2023
Minister for Defence	Ng Eng Hen	Ng Eng Hen	21 May 2011 – 22 May 2025
Minister for Foreign Affairs	Vivian Balakrishnan	Vivian Balakrishnan	1 October 2015 – present
Minister for Home Affairs	K. Shanmugam	K. Shanmugam	1 October 2015 – present
Minister for Law	K. Shanmugam	K. Shanmugam	1 May 2008 – 22 May 2025
Minister for Trade and Industry	Gan Kim Yong	Gan Kim Yong	15 May 2021 – 26 July 2026
Minister for Transport	S. Iswaran	S. Iswaran	15 May 2021 – 18 January 2024 (Note: Chee Hong Tat stood in as Acting Minister for Transport from 12 July 2023 until 17 January 2024, after S. Iswaran was instructed to take a leave of absence over an investigation by the Corrupt Practices Investigation Bureau.)
Minister-in-charge of Trade Relations	S. Iswaran	S. Iswaran	1 May 2018 – 18 January 2024
Minister for Sustainability and the Environment	Grace Fu	Grace Fu	27 July 2020 – present
Minister for Education	Chan Chun Sing	Chan Chun Sing	15 May 2021 – 22 May 2025
Minister for Social and Family Development	Masagos Zulkifli	Masagos Zulkifli	27 July 2020 – present
Second Minister for Health	Masagos Zulkifli	Masagos Zulkifli	27 July 2020 – 22 May 2025
Minister-in-charge of Muslim Affairs	Masagos Zulkifli	Masagos Zulkifli	1 May 2018 – 22 May 2025
Minister for Health	Ong Ye Kung	Ong Ye Kung	15 May 2021 – present
Minister for National Development		Desmond Lee	27 July 2020 – 22 May 2025
Minister-in-charge of Social Services Integration		Desmond Lee	27 July 2020 – present
Minister for Communications and Information		Josephine Teo	15 May 2021 – 7 July 2024
Second Minister for Home Affairs		Josephine Teo	11 September 2017 – 22 May 2025
Minister in the Prime Minister's Office		Indranee Rajah	1 May 2018 – present
Second Minister for Finance		Indranee Rajah	1 May 2018 – present
Second Minister for National Development		Indranee Rajah	27 July 2020 – present
Minister in the Prime Minister's Office		Maliki Osman	27 July 2020 – 22 May 2025
Second Minister for Education		Maliki Osman	27 July 2020 – 22 May 2025
Second Minister for Foreign Affairs		Maliki Osman	27 July 2020 – 22 May 2025
Minister for Culture, Community and Youth		Edwin Tong	27 July 2020 – 22 May 2025
Second Minister for Law		Edwin Tong	27 July 2020 – 22 May 2025
Minister for Manpower	Tan See Leng	Tan See Leng	15 May 2021 – 26 July 2026
Second Minister for Trade and Industry	Tan See Leng	Tan See Leng	27 July 2020 – 22 May 2025

=== January – May 2024 ===
S. Iswaran resigned as Transport Minister, Member of Parliament, and member of the People's Action Party on 16 January 2024, two days before he pleaded not guilty to 27 charges of obtaining gratification as a public servant, corruption, and obstructing justice. Thus, Chee Hong Tat was promoted to Minister of Transport and Grace Fu assumed responsibility as Minister-in-charge of Trade Relations on 18 January 2024 from S. Iswaran.

The cabinet was composed of the following members from 18 January 2024.

Portfolio	Portrait	Name	Term
Prime Minister	Lee Hsien Loong	Lee Hsien Loong	12 August 2004 – 15 May 2024
Deputy Prime Minister	Lawrence Wong	Lawrence Wong	13 June 2022 – 15 May 2024
Minister for Finance	Lawrence Wong	Lawrence Wong	15 May 2021 – present
Deputy Prime Minister	Heng Swee Keat	Heng Swee Keat	1 May 2019 – 22 May 2025
Coordinating Minister for Economic Policies	Heng Swee Keat	Heng Swee Keat	27 July 2020 – 15 May 2024
Senior Minister	Teo Chee Hean	Teo Chee Hean	1 May 2019 – 22 May 2025
Coordinating Minister for National Security	Teo Chee Hean	Teo Chee Hean	21 May 2011 – 22 May 2025
Minister for Defence	Ng Eng Hen	Ng Eng Hen	21 May 2011 – 22 May 2025
Minister for Foreign Affairs	Vivian Balakrishnan	Vivian Balakrishnan	1 October 2015 – present
Minister for Home Affairs	K. Shanmugam	K. Shanmugam	1 October 2015 – present
Minister for Law	K. Shanmugam	K. Shanmugam	1 May 2008 – 22 May 2025
Minister for Trade and Industry	Gan Kim Yong	Gan Kim Yong	15 May 2021 – 26 July 2026
Minister for Sustainability and the Environment	Grace Fu	Grace Fu	27 July 2020 – present
Minister-in-charge of Trade Relations	Grace Fu	Grace Fu	18 January 2024 – present
Minister for Education	Chan Chun Sing	Chan Chun Sing	15 May 2021 – 22 May 2025
Minister for Social and Family Development	Masagos Zulkifli	Masagos Zulkifli	27 July 2020 – present
Second Minister for Health	Masagos Zulkifli	Masagos Zulkifli	27 July 2020 – 22 May 2025
Minister-in-charge of Muslim Affairs	Masagos Zulkifli	Masagos Zulkifli	1 May 2018 – 22 May 2025
Minister for Health	Ong Ye Kung	Ong Ye Kung	15 May 2021 – present
Minister for National Development		Desmond Lee	27 July 2020 – 22 May 2025
Minister-in-charge of Social Services Integration		Desmond Lee	27 July 2020 – present
Minister for Communications and Information		Josephine Teo	15 May 2021 – 7 July 2024
Second Minister for Home Affairs		Josephine Teo	11 September 2017 – 22 May 2025
Minister in the Prime Minister's Office		Indranee Rajah	1 May 2018 – present
Second Minister for Finance		Indranee Rajah	1 May 2018 – present
Second Minister for National Development		Indranee Rajah	27 July 2020 – present
Minister in the Prime Minister's Office		Maliki Osman	27 July 2020 – 22 May 2025
Second Minister for Education		Maliki Osman	27 July 2020 – 22 May 2025
Second Minister for Foreign Affairs		Maliki Osman	27 July 2020 – 22 May 2025
Minister for Culture, Community and Youth		Edwin Tong	27 July 2020 – 22 May 2025
Second Minister for Law		Edwin Tong	27 July 2020 – 22 May 2025
Minister for Manpower	Tan See Leng	Tan See Leng	15 May 2021 – 26 July 2026
Second Minister for Trade and Industry	Tan See Leng	Tan See Leng	27 July 2020 – 22 May 2025
Minister for Transport	Chee Hong Tat	Chee Hong Tat	18 January 2024 – 22 May 2025
Second Minister for Finance	Chee Hong Tat	Chee Hong Tat	18 January 2024 – 22 May 2025

== List of office holders ==
The following is the list of office holders in the Fifth Lee Hsien Loong Cabinet. Cabinet members are listed in bold.

Prime Minister's Office
Office	Name	Term start	Term end
Prime Minister	**Lee Hsien Loong**	27 July 2020	15 May 2024
Deputy Prime Minister	**Heng Swee Keat**	27 July 2020	15 May 2024
Deputy Prime Minister	**Lawrence Wong**	13 June 2022	15 May 2024
Senior Minister	**Teo Chee Hean**	27 July 2020	15 May 2024
Senior Minister	**Tharman Shanmugaratnam**	27 July 2020	7 July 2023
Coordinating Minister for Economic Policies	**Heng Swee Keat**	27 July 2020	15 May 2024
Coordinating Minister for National Security	**Teo Chee Hean**	27 July 2020	15 May 2024
Coordinating Minister for Social Policies	**Tharman Shanmugaratnam**	27 July 2020	7 July 2023
Minister in the Prime Minister's Office	**Indranee Rajah**	27 July 2020	15 May 2024
Minister in the Prime Minister's Office	**Maliki Osman**	27 July 2020	15 May 2024
Minister in the Prime Minister's Office	**Tan See Leng**	27 July 2020	14 May 2021
Minister of State in the Prime Minister's Office	Tan Kiat How	27 July 2020	14 May 2021
Minister of State in the Prime Minister's Office	Desmond Tan	13 June 2022	15 May 2024
Ministry of Communications and Information
Office	Name	Term start	Term end
Minister for Communications and Information	**S. Iswaran**	27 July 2020	14 May 2021
Minister for Communications and Information	**Josephine Teo**	15 May 2021	15 May 2024
Senior Minister of State for Communications and Information	Sim Ann	27 July 2020	14 May 2021
Senior Minister of State for Communications and Information	Janil Puthucheary	27 July 2020	15 May 2024
Senior Minister of State for Communications and Information	Tan Kiat How	13 June 2022	15 May 2024
Minister of State for Communications and Information	Tan Kiat How	15 May 2021	12 June 2022
Parliamentary Secretary for Communications and Information	Rahayu Mahzam	15 May 2021	12 June 2022
Ministry of Culture, Community and Youth
Office	Name	Term start	Term end
Minister for Culture, Community and Youth	**Edwin Tong**	27 July 2020	15 May 2024
Minister of State for Culture, Community and Youth	Low Yen Ling	27 July 2020	15 May 2024
Minister of State for Culture, Community and Youth	Alvin Tan	1 September 2020	15 May 2024
Senior Parliamentary Secretary for Culture, Community and Youth	Eric Chua	13 June 2022	15 May 2024
Parliamentary Secretary for Culture, Community and Youth	Eric Chua	27 July 2020	12 June 2022
Ministry of Defence
Office	Name	Term start	Term end
Minister for Defence	**Ng Eng Hen**	27 July 2020	15 May 2024
Senior Minister of State for Defence	Heng Chee How	27 July 2020	15 May 2024
Senior Minister of State for Defence	Zaqy Mohamad	27 July 2020	15 May 2024
Ministry of Education
Office	Name	Term start	Term end
Minister for Education	**Lawrence Wong**	27 July 2020	14 May 2021
Minister for Education	**Chan Chun Sing**	15 May 2021	15 May 2024
Second Minister for Education	**Maliki Osman**	27 July 2020	15 May 2024
Minister of State for Education	Sun Xueling	27 July 2020	12 June 2022
Minister of State for Education	Gan Siow Huang	27 July 2020	15 May 2024
Ministry of Finance
Office	Name	Term start	Term end
Minister for Finance	**Heng Swee Keat**	27 July 2020	14 May 2021
Minister for Finance	**Lawrence Wong**	15 May 2021	15 May 2024
Second Minister for Finance	**Lawrence Wong**	27 July 2020	14 May 2021
Second Minister for Finance	**Indranee Rajah**	27 July 2020	15 May 2024
Second Minister for Finance	**Chee Hong Tat**	18 January 2024	15 May 2024
Senior Minister of State for Finance	Chee Hong Tat	13 June 2022	15 May 2024
Ministry of Foreign Affairs
Office	Name	Term start	Term end
Minister for Foreign Affairs	**Vivian Balakrishnan**	27 July 2020	15 May 2024
Second Minister for Foreign Affairs	**Maliki Osman**	27 July 2020	15 May 2024
Senior Minister of State for Foreign Affairs	Chee Hong Tat	27 July 2020	14 May 2021
Senior Minister of State for Foreign Affairs	Sim Ann	15 May 2021	15 May 2024
Ministry of Health
Office	Name	Term start	Term end
Minister for Health	**Gan Kim Yong**	27 July 2020	14 May 2021
Minister for Health	**Ong Ye Kung**	15 May 2021	15 May 2024
Second Minister for Health	**Masagos Zulkifli** (Note: Masagos Zulkifli was concurrently the Minister-in-charge of Muslim Affairs.)	27 July 2020	15 May 2024
Senior Minister of State for Health	Koh Poh Koon	27 July 2020	12 June 2022
Senior Minister of State for Health	Janil Puthucheary	27 July 2020	15 May 2024
Senior Parliamentary Secretary for Health	Rahayu Mahzam	13 June 2022	15 May 2024
Parliamentary Secretary for Health	Rahayu Mahzam	1 September 2020	12 June 2022
Ministry of Home Affairs
Office	Name	Term start	Term end
Minister for Home Affairs	**K. Shanmugam**	27 July 2020	15 May 2024
Second Minister for Home Affairs	**Josephine Teo**	27 July 2020	15 May 2024
Minister of State for Home Affairs	Faishal Ibrahim	27 July 2020	15 May 2024
Minister of State for Home Affairs	Desmond Tan	27 July 2020	12 June 2022
Minister of State for Home Affairs	Sun Xueling	13 June 2022	15 May 2024
Ministry of Law
Office	Name	Term start	Term end
Minister for Law	**K. Shanmugam**	27 July 2020	15 May 2024
Second Minister for Law	**Edwin Tong**	27 July 2020	15 May 2024
Senior Parliamentary Secretary for Law	Rahayu Mahzam	13 June 2022	15 May 2024
Minister for Manpower
Office	Name	Term start	Term end
Minister for Manpower	**Josephine Teo**	27 July 2020	14 May 2021
Minister for Manpower	**Tan See Leng**	15 May 2021	15 May 2024
Second Minister for Manpower	**Tan See Leng**	27 July 2020	14 May 2021
Senior Minister of State for Manpower	Zaqy Mohamad	27 July 2020	15 May 2024
Senior Minister of State for Manpower	Koh Poh Koon	15 May 2021	15 May 2024
Minister of State for Manpower	Gan Siow Huang	27 July 2020	15 May 2024
Ministry of National Development
Office	Name	Term start	Term end
Minister for National Development	**Desmond Lee**	27 July 2020	15 May 2024
Second Minister for National Development	**Indranee Rajah**	27 July 2020	15 May 2024
Senior Minister of State for National Development	Sim Ann	27 July 2020	15 May 2024
Senior Minister of State for National Development	Tan Kiat How	13 June 2022	15 May 2024
Minister of State for National Development	Faishal Ibrahim	27 July 2020	15 May 2024
Minister of State for National Development	Tan Kiat How	27 July 2020	12 June 2022
Ministry of Social and Family Development
Office	Name	Term start	Term end
Minister for Social and Family Development	**Masagos Zulkifli**	27 July 2020	15 May 2024
Minister-in-charge of Social Services Integration	**Desmond Lee**	27 July 2020	15 May 2024
Minister of State for Social and Family Development	Sun Xueling	27 July 2020	15 May 2024
Senior Parliamentary Secretary for Social and Family Development	Eric Chua	13 June 2022	15 May 2024
Parliamentary Secretary for Social and Family Development	Eric Chua	27 July 2020	12 June 2022
Ministry of Sustainability and the Environment
Office	Name	Term start	Term end
Minister for Sustainability and the Environment	**Grace Fu**	27 July 2020	15 May 2024
Senior Minister of State for Sustainability and the Environment	Amy Khor	27 July 2020	15 May 2024
Senior Minister of State for Sustainability and the Environment	Koh Poh Koon	13 June 2022	15 May 2024
Minister of State for Sustainability and the Environment	Desmond Tan	27 July 2020	12 June 2022
Senior Parliamentary Secretary for Sustainability and the Environment	Baey Yam Keng	13 June 2022	15 May 2024
Ministry of Trade and Industry
Office	Name	Term start	Term end
Minister for Trade and Industry	**Chan Chun Sing**	27 July 2020	14 May 2021
Minister for Trade and Industry	**Gan Kim Yong**	15 May 2021	15 May 2024
Minister-in-charge of Trade Relations	**S. Iswaran**	27 July 2020	18 January 2024
Minister-in-charge of Trade Relations	**Grace Fu**	18 January 2024	15 May 2024
Second Minister for Trade and Industry	**Tan See Leng**	27 July 2020	15 May 2024
Minister of State for Trade and Industry	Low Yen Ling	27 July 2020	15 May 2024
Minister of State for Trade and Industry	Alvin Tan	1 September 2020	15 May 2024
Ministry of Transport
Office	Name	Term start	Term end
Minister for Transport	**Ong Ye Kung**	27 July 2020	14 May 2021
Minister for Transport	**S. Iswaran**	15 May 2021	18 January 2024
Minister for Transport	**Chee Hong Tat**	18 January 2024	15 May 2024
Senior Minister of State for Transport	Amy Khor	27 July 2020	15 May 2024
Senior Minister of State for Transport	Chee Hong Tat	27 July 2020	15 May 2024
Senior Parliamentary Secretary for Transport	Baey Yam Keng	27 July 2020	15 May 2024
