= Ministry of Transport (Singapore) =

Ministry in the Government of Singapore

Agency overview
- Formed: 23 November 2001; 24 years ago
- Preceding agency: Ministry of Digital Development and Information
- Jurisdiction: Government of Singapore
- Headquarters: 460 Alexandra Road, #33-00 mTower, Singapore 119963
- Motto: Connecting People and Possibilities
- Annual budget: ▼ S$10.68 billion (2019)
- Ministers responsible: Jeffrey Siow, Minister; Sun Xueling, Senior Minister of State; Murali Pillai, Senior Minister of State; Baey Yam Keng, Minister of State
- Agency executives: Lau Peet Meng, Permanent Secretary; Lau Boon Ping, Deputy Secretary (Land, Communications and Technology) (designate); Yee Ping Yi, Deputy Secretary (Strategy, Sustainability & Technology); Teo Eng Dih, Deputy Secretary (Special Duties)
- Child agencies: Civil Aviation Authority of Singapore; Land Transport Authority; Maritime and Port Authority of Singapore; Public Transport Council
- Website: www.mot.gov.sg
- Agency ID: T08GA0023K

The Ministry of Transport (MOT; Malay: Kementerian Pengangkutan; Chinese: 交通部; Tamil: போக்குவரத்து அமைச்சு) is a ministry of the Government of Singapore responsible for the administration and regulation of land, sea and air transportation in Singapore.

== History ==
The Ministry of Transport was formed on 23 November 2001 out of the then Ministry of Communications and Information Technology. Its previous portfolio of information technology and telecommunications were then transferred to the then Ministry of Information, Communications and The Arts, now known as the Ministry of Digital Development and Information.

== Organisational structure ==
Currently, the ministry commissions and regulates four individual government statutory boards: the Civil Aviation Authority of Singapore (CAAS), the Land Transport Authority (LTA), the Maritime and Port Authority of Singapore (MPA) and the Public Transport Council (PTC), which implement the ministry’s policies and tactical directions.

The Ministry has ten divisions with staff strength of nearly 200 staff. These are Air Hub Division, Aviation Relations and System Division, Public Transport Division, Private and Future Mobility Division, Sea Transport Division, International Relations and Security Division, Corporate Communications Division, Corporate Development Division, MOT Technology Office and the Transport Safety Investigation Bureau of Singapore (TSIB).

=== Statutory Boards ===
- Civil Aviation Authority of Singapore
- Land Transport Authority
- Maritime and Port Authority of Singapore
- Public Transport Council

== Ministers ==
The Ministry is headed by the Minister for Transport, who is appointed as part of the Cabinet of Singapore. The current structure of the ministry was established in 2001. Since the position was first created in 1968 under its predecessor agencies, every individual who has served as Minister for Transport has been a member of the People's Action Party (PAP). The incubment Minister is Jeffrey Siow, an MP for Chua Chu Kang GRC from the People's Action Party.

Minister	Took office	Left office	Party	Cabinet
Yeo Cheow Tong; MP for Hong Kah GRC (born 1947)	23 November 2001	29 May 2006	PAP	Goh IV
Yeo Cheow Tong; MP for Hong Kah GRC (born 1947)	23 November 2001	29 May 2006	PAP	Lee H. I
Raymond Lim; MP for East Coast GRC (born 1959)	30 May 2006	20 May 2011	PAP	Lee H. II
Lui Tuck Yew; MP for Moulmein–Kallang GRC (born 1961)	21 May 2011	30 September 2015	PAP	Lee H. III
Khaw Boon Wan (Note: Khaw Boon Wan went on leave from 25 February until 5 April 2019, during which Vivian Balakrishnan served as acting minister.); MP for Sembawang GRC (born 1952)	1 October 2015	26 July 2020	PAP	Lee H. IV
Ong Ye Kung; MP for Sembawang GRC (born 1969)	27 July 2020	14 May 2021	PAP	Lee H. V
S. Iswaran; MP for West Coast GRC (born 1962)	15 May 2021	18 January 2024	PAP	Lee H. V
Chee Hong Tat (Note: Chee Hong Tat served as acting minister from 12 July 2023 until 17 January 2024.); MP for Bishan–Toa Payoh GRC (born 1973)	12 July 2023	17 January 2024	PAP	Lee H. V
Chee Hong Tat; MP for Bishan–Toa Payoh GRC (born 1973)	18 January 2024	22 May 2025	PAP	Lee H. V
Chee Hong Tat; MP for Bishan–Toa Payoh GRC (born 1973)	18 January 2024	22 May 2025	PAP	Wong I
Jeffrey Siow (Note: Jeffrey Siow served as acting minister from 23 May 2025 until 27 July 2026.); MP for Choa Chu Kang GRC (born 1978)	23 May 2025	27 July 2026	PAP	Wong II
Jeffrey Siow; MP for Choa Chu Kang GRC (born 1978)	27 July 2026	Incumbent	PAP	Wong II

== See also ==
- Ministry of Transport
