= Ministry of Culture, Community and Youth =

Government ministry in Singapore

Agency overview
- Formed: 1 November 2012; 14 years ago
- Preceding agency: Ministry of Community Development, Youth and Sports
- Jurisdiction: Government of Singapore
- Headquarters: Old Hill Street Police Station, 140 Hill Street, #01-01A, Singapore 179369
- Motto: Together, Let's Build a Singapore That We Can Call Home
- Employees: 5,242 (2018)
- Annual budget: ▲ S$2.07 billion (2019)
- Ministers responsible: David Neo, Minister; Low Yen Ling, Senior Minister of State; Baey Yam Keng, Minister of State; Dinesh Vasu Dash, Minister of State; Goh Hanyan, Senior Parliamentary Secretary
- Agency executives: Teoh Zsin Woon, Permanent Secretary; Lee Tung Jean, Deputy Secretary (Culture and Sports); Amy Hing, Deputy Secretary (Community and Youth)
- Child agencies: Hindu Endowments Board; Majlis Ugama Islam Singapura; National Arts Council; National Heritage Board; National Youth Council; People's Association; Sport Singapore; School of the Arts, Singapore; Singapore Art Museum; National Gallery Singapore; Singapore Sports School
- Website: www.mccy.gov.sg
- Agency ID: T12GA0001C

The Ministry of Culture, Community and Youth (MCCY; Malay: Kementerian Kebudayaan, Masyarakat dan Belia; Chinese: 文化、社区及青年部; Tamil: கலாசார, சமூக, இளையர்துறை அமைச்சு) is a ministry of the Government of Singapore responsible for the formulation and implementation of policies related to the arts, sports, youth and community in Singapore.

== History ==
The MCCY was formed on 1 November 2012 as part of a structural reform by the then Ministry of Community Development, Youth and Sports (MCYS). The MCYS became the Ministry of Social and Family Development (MSF) and transferred several of its portfolios, such as Youth Development and Sports to MCCY.

In 2022, the Ministry appointed members of the first disciplinary panel to handle moderate to severe cases of misconduct for member organisations under the Safe Sport Programme.

== Statutory Boards ==
- Hindu Endowments Board
- Majlis Ugama Islam Singapura
- National Arts Council
- National Heritage Board
- National Youth Council
- People's Association
- Sport Singapore
- School of the Arts
- Singapore Art Museum
- National Gallery Singapore
- Singapore Sports School
- The Esplanade

== Ministers ==
The Ministry is headed by the Minister for Culture, Community and Youth, appointed as part of the Cabinet of Singapore. The incubment Minister is David Neo, an MP for Tampines GRC from the People's Action Party.

Minister	Took office	Left office	Party	Cabinet
Lawrence Wong (Note: Lawrence Wong served as acting minister from 1 November 2012 until 30 April 2014.); MP for West Coast GRC (born 1972)	1 November 2012	30 April 2014	PAP	Lee H. III
Lawrence Wong; MP for West Coast GRC (born 1972)	1 May 2014	30 September 2015	PAP	Lee H. III
Grace Fu; MP for Yuhua SMC (born 1964)	1 October 2015	26 July 2020	PAP	Lee H. IV
Edwin Tong; MP for East Coast GRC (born 1969)	27 July 2020	22 May 2025	PAP	Lee H. V
Edwin Tong; MP for East Coast GRC (born 1969)	27 July 2020	22 May 2025	PAP	Wong I
David Neo (Note: David Neo served as acting minister from 23 May 2025 until 27 July 2026.); MP for Tampines GRC (born 1977)	23 May 2025	27 July 2026	PAP	Wong II
David Neo; MP for Tampines GRC (born 1977)	27 July 2026	Incumbent	PAP	Wong II
