= Early Childhood Development Agency =

Autonomous Agency in Singapore

- Logo of the Early Childhood Development Agency

Agency overview
- Formed: 1 April 2013; 13 years ago
- Jurisdiction: Government of Singapore
- Headquarters: 51 Cuppage Road, #08-01, Singapore 229469
- Agency executive: Ku Geok Boon, Chief Executive Officer
- Parent agency: Ministry of Social and Family Development; Ministry of Education
- Website: www.ecda.gov.sg

The Early Childhood Development Agency (ECDA; Malay: Agensi Pembangunan Awal Kanak-kanak; Chinese: 幼儿培育署; Tamil: ஆரம்பகால பாலர்பருவ மேம்பாட்டு வாரியம்) is an autonomous government agency of the Ministry of Social and Family Development (MSF) that manages the early childhood education sector such as overseeing the development of childcare centres and kindergartens in Singapore. The agency is jointly overseen by the Ministry of Social and Family Development (MSF) and Ministry of Education (MOE).

== History ==
The idea of having an agency for early childhood was first proposed during the 2012 National Day Rally by Prime Minister Lee Hsien Loong as a statutory board, being part of a plan to raise early childhood education standards in Singapore. Before the agency was formed, kindergartens and childcare centres were managed by the Ministry of Education's Pre-school Education Branch and Ministry of Social and Family Development's Child Care Division respectively.

Following the announcement, the agency was formed on 1 April 2013.

== Overview ==
The agency's mission is "To Ensure Every Child Has Access To Affordable And Quality Early Childhood Development Services And Programmes", where the early childhood sector is of good quality and has good educators for each child. It mainly focuses on children under the age of 7.

== See also ==
- Child care
- Early childhood education
- Education in Singapore
- Kindergarten
- Ministry of Education (Singapore)
- Ministry of Social and Family Development
