= Second Lawrence Wong Cabinet =

Cabinet of Singapore since 2025

- 19th Cabinet of Singapore
- 2025–present
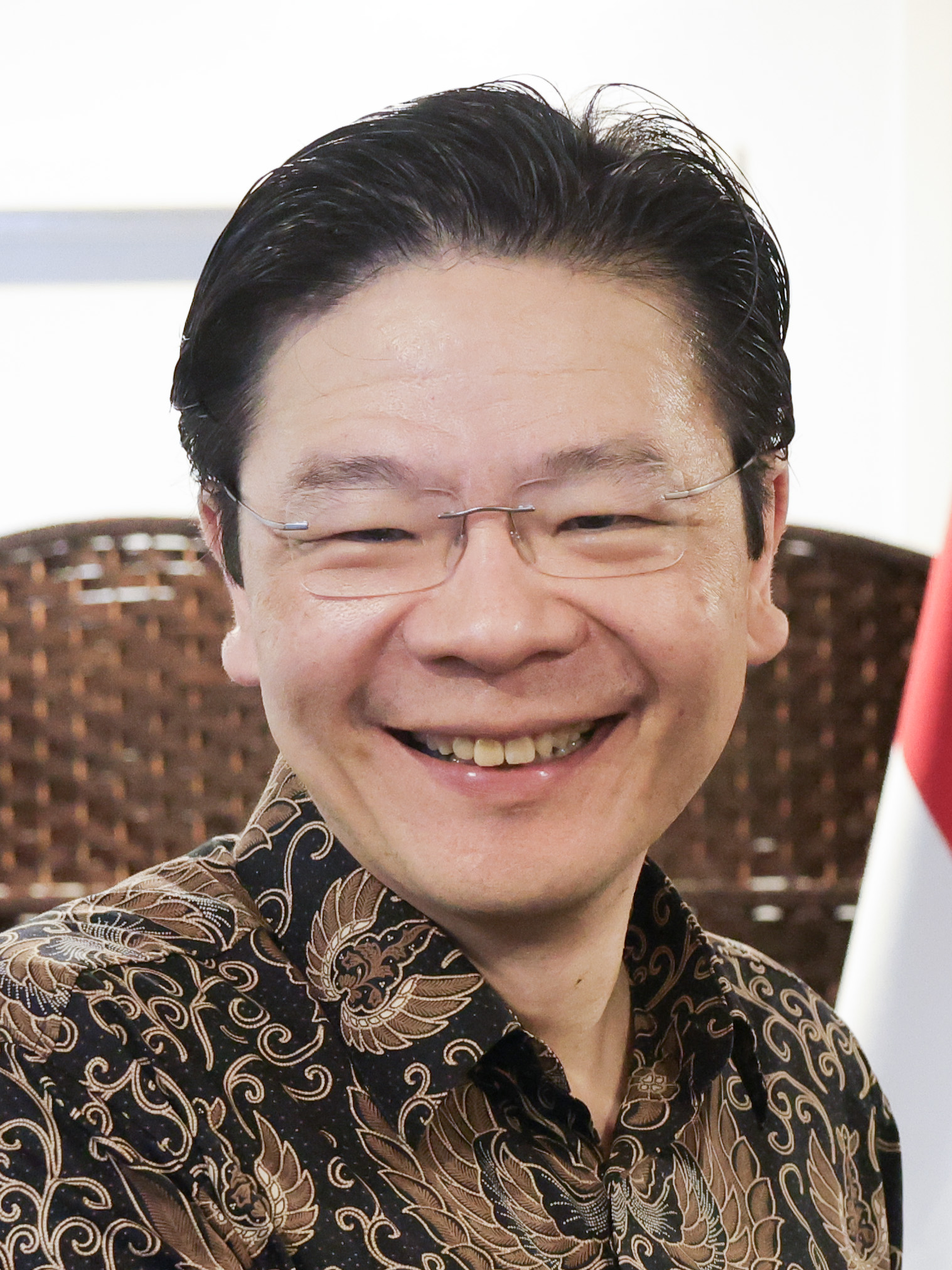
- Date formed: 23 May 2025

People and organisations
- Head of state: Tharman Shanmugaratnam
- Deputy head of government: Gan Kim Yong
- Member party: People's Action Party
- Status in legislature: Supermajority
- Opposition party: Workers' Party
- Opposition leader: Pritam Singh (until 15 January 2026)

History
- Legislature term: 15th
- Predecessor: First Lawrence Wong Cabinet

The Second Cabinet of Lawrence Wong of the Government of Singapore was announced on 21 May 2025 and came into effect on 23 May 2025.

== Changes ==
Upon his successful supermajority in the 2025 general election, Lawrence Wong stated that his immediate priority was to form the new cabinet, which would be announced "in due course" through a press conference and followed by a swearing-in ceremony. He also indicated that NTUC secretary-general Ng Chee Meng was likely to be included, citing the precedent of labour chiefs playing key roles in past Cabinets. On 5 May, Wong also announced that Workers' Party's (WP) Pritam Singh would remain as the opposition leader.

After a photo of Ng and convicted money launderer Su Haijin was circulated online, Ng requested on 6 May for Wong not to assign him any cabinet position. Ng also apologised for his "disrespectful" remarks made to public servants at a 2017 Ministry of Education dialogue.

Wong announced his new Cabinet line-up on 21 May. Among the incumbent MPs, three new coordinating ministers were appointed, with Gan Kim Yong as the only Deputy Prime Minister. Chan Chun Sing assumed the role of Defence Minister and was re-appointed as Coordinating Minister for Public Services, Desmond Lee was appointed as Education Minister, and Chee Hong Tat was appointed as National Development Minister. Ong Ye Kung was appointed as Coordinating Minister for Social Policies, and K. Shanmugam was appointed Coordinating Minister for National Security. Edwin Tong was promoted to full minister for the Law portfolio, and took on a new appointment as Second Home Affairs Minister. Muhammad Faishal Ibrahim was appointed Acting Minister-in-charge of Muslim Affairs.

Newly-elected Members of Parliament (MPs) Jeffrey Siow and David Neo became Acting Ministers for Transport and Culture, Community and Youth respectively. Wong also added that Ng's exclusion from the new Cabinet was a "temporary arrangement", and expressed hope to include him into the Cabinet soon.

On 20 July 2026, Faishal resigned as Acting Minister-in-charge of Muslim Affairs due to personal reasons. He was succeeded by Zaqy Mohamad.

Wong announced his first Cabinet reshuffle on 22 July 2026, after the general elections in 2025. Shanmugam was given an additional role as Senior Minister, and is the first whom have not served as a Prime Minister or Deputy Prime Minister previously. Siow and Neo were promoted to full ministers, while Ng was reappointed as Minister in the Prime Minister's Office. MPs Sim Ann and Jasmin Lau joined the cabinet for their first time.

== Cabinet ==
The cabinet was sworn in on 23 May 2025. The announced reshuffle of Wong's cabinet on 22 July will take effective from 27 July 2026.

=== May 2025 – July 2026 ===
The cabinet was composed of the following members from 23 May 2025.

Portfolio	Portrait	Name	Term
Prime Minister	Lawrence Wong	Lawrence Wong	15 May 2024 – present
Minister for Finance	Lawrence Wong	Lawrence Wong	15 May 2021 – present
Senior Minister	Lee Hsien Loong	Lee Hsien Loong	15 May 2024 – present
Deputy Prime Minister	Gan Kim Yong	Gan Kim Yong	15 May 2024 – present
Minister for Trade and Industry	Gan Kim Yong	Gan Kim Yong	15 May 2021 – 26 July 2026
Coordinating Minister for National Security	K. Shanmugam	K. Shanmugam	23 May 2025 – present
Minister for Home Affairs	K. Shanmugam	K. Shanmugam	1 October 2015 – present
Coordinating Minister for Public Services	Chan Chun Sing	Chan Chun Sing	23 May 2025 – present
Minister for Defence	Chan Chun Sing	Chan Chun Sing	23 May 2025 – present
Coordinating Minister for Social Policies	Ong Ye Kung	Ong Ye Kung	23 May 2025 – present
Minister for Health	Ong Ye Kung	Ong Ye Kung	15 May 2021 – present
Minister for Foreign Affairs	Vivian Balakrishnan	Vivian Balakrishnan	1 October 2015 – present
Minister for Sustainability and the Environment	Grace Fu	Grace Fu	27 July 2020 – present
Minister-in-charge of Trade Relations	Grace Fu	Grace Fu	18 January 2024 – present
Minister for Social and Family Development	Masagos Zulkifli	Masagos Zulkifli	27 July 2020 – present
Minister for Digital Development and Information		Josephine Teo	8 July 2024 – present
Minister for Education	Desmond Lee	Desmond Lee	23 May 2025 – present
Minister-in-charge of Social Service Integration	Desmond Lee	Desmond Lee	27 July 2020 – present
Minister in the Prime Minister's Office		Indranee Rajah	1 May 2018 – present
Second Minister for Finance		Indranee Rajah	1 May 2018 – present
Second Minister for National Development		Indranee Rajah	27 July 2020 – present
Minister for Law		Edwin Tong	23 May 2025 – present
Second Minister for Home Affairs		Edwin Tong	23 May 2025 – present
Minister for Manpower	Tan See Leng	Tan See Leng	15 May 2021 – 26 July 2026
Minister-in-charge of Energy, and Science and Technology	Tan See Leng	Tan See Leng	23 May 2025 – 26 July 2026
Minister for National Development	Chee Hong Tat	Chee Hong Tat	23 May 2025 – present
Acting Minister-in-charge of Muslim Affairs	Faishal Ibrahim	Faishal Ibrahim	23 May 2025 – 20 July 2026
Acting Minister-in-charge of Muslim Affairs	Zaqy Mohamad	Zaqy Mohamad	20 July 2026 – present
Acting Minister for Culture, Community and Youth	David Neo	David Neo	23 May 2025 – 26 July 2026
Acting Minister for Transport	Jeffrey Siow	Jeffrey Siow	23 May 2025 – 26 July 2026

=== July 2026 – present ===
The cabinet is composed of the following members since 27 July 2026.

Portfolio	Portrait	Name	Term
Prime Minister	Lawrence Wong	Lawrence Wong	15 May 2024 – present
Minister for Finance	Lawrence Wong	Lawrence Wong	15 May 2021 – present
Senior Minister	Lee Hsien Loong	Lee Hsien Loong	15 May 2024 – present
Deputy Prime Minister	Gan Kim Yong	Gan Kim Yong	15 May 2024 – present
Minister for Trade and Industry (Trade)	Gan Kim Yong	Gan Kim Yong	27 July 2026 – present
Senior Minister	K. Shanmugam	K. Shanmugam	27 July 2026 – present
Coordinating Minister for National Security	K. Shanmugam	K. Shanmugam	23 May 2025 – present
Minister for Home Affairs	K. Shanmugam	K. Shanmugam	1 October 2015 – present
Coordinating Minister for Public Services	Chan Chun Sing	Chan Chun Sing	23 May 2025 – present
Minister for Defence	Chan Chun Sing	Chan Chun Sing	23 May 2025 – present
Coordinating Minister for Social Policies	Ong Ye Kung	Ong Ye Kung	23 May 2025 – present
Minister for Health	Ong Ye Kung	Ong Ye Kung	15 May 2021 – present
Minister for Foreign Affairs	Vivian Balakrishnan	Vivian Balakrishnan	1 October 2015 – present
Minister for Sustainability and the Environment	Grace Fu	Grace Fu	27 July 2020 – present
Minister-in-charge of Trade Relations	Grace Fu	Grace Fu	18 January 2024 – present
Minister for Social and Family Development	Masagos Zulkifli	Masagos Zulkifli	27 July 2020 – present
Minister for Digital Development and Information		Josephine Teo	8 July 2024 – present
Minister for Education	Desmond Lee	Desmond Lee	23 May 2025 – present
Minister-in-charge of Social Service Integration	Desmond Lee	Desmond Lee	27 July 2020 – present
Minister in the Prime Minister's Office		Indranee Rajah	1 May 2018 – present
Second Minister for Finance		Indranee Rajah	1 May 2018 – present
Second Minister for National Development		Indranee Rajah	27 July 2020 – present
Minister for Law		Edwin Tong	23 May 2025 – present
Second Minister for Home Affairs		Edwin Tong	23 May 2025 – present
Minister for Trade and Industry (Energy and Industry)	Tan See Leng	Tan See Leng	27 July 2026 – present
Minister for National Development	Chee Hong Tat	Chee Hong Tat	23 May 2025 – present
Minister in the Prime Minister's Office	NgCheeMeng_PAP	Ng Chee Meng	27 July 2026 – present
Minister for Transport	Jeffrey Siow	Jeffrey Siow	27 July 2026 – present
Second Minister for Finance	Jeffrey Siow	Jeffrey Siow	27 July 2026 – present
Minister for Culture, Community and Youth	David Neo	David Neo	27 July 2026 – present
Second Minister for Education	David Neo	David Neo	27 July 2026 – present
Second Minister for Foreign Affairs		Sim Ann	27 July 2026 – present
Second Minister for Home Affairs		Sim Ann	27 July 2026 – present
Acting Minister-in-charge of Muslim Affairs	Zaqy Mohamad	Zaqy Mohamad	20 July 2026 – present
Acting Minister for Manpower		Jasmin Lau	27 July 2026 – present

== List of office holders ==
The following is the list of office holders in the Second Lawrence Wong Cabinet. Cabinet members are listed in bold.

Prime Minister's Office
Office	Name	Term start	Term end
Prime Minister	**Lawrence Wong**	23 May 2025	Incumbent
Senior Minister	**Lee Hsien Loong**	23 May 2025	Incumbent
Senior Minister	**K. Shanmugam**	27 July 2026	Incumbent
Deputy Prime Minister	**Gan Kim Yong**	23 May 2025	Incumbent
Coordinating Minister for National Security	**K. Shanmugam**	23 May 2025	Incumbent
Coordinating Minister for Public Services	**Chan Chun Sing**	23 May 2025	Incumbent
Coordinating Minister for Social Policies	**Ong Ye Kung**	23 May 2025	Incumbent
Minister in the Prime Minister's Office	**Indranee Rajah**	23 May 2025	Incumbent
Minister in the Prime Minister's Office	**Ng Chee Meng**	27 July 2026	Incumbent
Senior Minister of State in the Prime Minister's Office	Desmond Tan	23 May 2025	Incumbent
Ministry of Culture, Community and Youth
Office	Name	Term start	Term end
Minister for Culture, Community and Youth	**David Neo** (Note: In an acting capacity until 26 July 2026.)	23 May 2025	Incumbent
Senior Minister of State for Culture, Community and Youth	Low Yen Ling	23 May 2025	Incumbent
Minister of State for Culture, Community and Youth	Dinesh Vasu Dash	23 May 2025	Incumbent
Minister of State for Culture, Community and Youth	Baey Yam Keng	23 May 2025	Incumbent
Senior Parliamentary Secretary for Culture, Community and Youth	Goh Hanyan	23 May 2025	Incumbent
Ministry of Defence
Office	Name	Term start	Term end
Minister for Defence	**Chan Chun Sing**	23 May 2025	Incumbent
Senior Minister of State for Defence	**Zaqy Mohamad** (Note: Zaqy Mohamad is concurrently the Acting Minister-in-charge of Muslim Affairs since 20 July 2026.)	23 May 2025	Incumbent
Minister of State for Defence	Desmond Choo	23 May 2025	Incumbent
Ministry of Digital Development and Information
Office	Name	Term start	Term end
Minister for Digital Development and Information	**Josephine Teo**	23 May 2025	Incumbent
Senior Minister of State for Digital Development and Information	Tan Kiat How	23 May 2025	Incumbent
Senior Minister of State for Digital Development and Information	Jasmin Lau	27 July 2026	Incumbent
Minister of State for Digital Development and Information	Rahayu Mahzam	23 May 2025	Incumbent
Minister of State for Digital Development and Information	Jasmin Lau	23 May 2025	26 July 2026
Ministry of Education
Office	Name	Term start	Term end
Minister for Education	**Desmond Lee**	23 May 2025	Incumbent
Second Minister for Education	**David Neo**	27 July 2026	Incumbent
Senior Minister of State for Education	David Neo	23 May 2025	26 July 2026
Senior Minister of State for Education	Janil Puthucheary	23 May 2025	Incumbent
Minister of State for Education	Jasmin Lau	23 May 2025	26 July 2026
Minister of State for Education	Shawn Loh	27 July 2026	Incumbent
Senior Parliamentary Secretary for Education	Syed Harun Alhabsyi	1 October 2025	Incumbent
Ministry of Finance
Office	Name	Term start	Term end
Minister for Finance	**Lawrence Wong**	23 May 2025	Incumbent
Second Minister for Finance	**Indranee Rajah**	23 May 2025	Incumbent
Second Minister for Finance	**Jeffrey Siow**	27 July 2026	Incumbent
Senior Minister of State for Finance	Jeffrey Siow	23 May 2025	26 July 2026
Senior Parliamentary Secretary for Finance	Shawn Huang	23 May 2025	Incumbent
Ministry of Foreign Affairs
Office	Name	Term start	Term end
Minister for Foreign Affairs	**Vivian Balakrishnan**	23 May 2025	Incumbent
Second Minister for Foreign Affairs	**Sim Ann**	27 July 2026	Incumbent
Senior Minister of State for Foreign Affairs	Sim Ann	23 May 2025	26 July 2026
Minister of State for Foreign Affairs	Gan Siow Huang	23 May 2025	Incumbent
Minister of State for Foreign Affairs	Zhulkarnain Abdul Rahim	1 February 2026	Incumbent
Minister of State for Foreign Affairs	Alvin Tan	27 July 2026	Incumbent
Ministry of Health
Office	Name	Term start	Term end
Minister for Health	**Ong Ye Kung**	23 May 2025	Incumbent
Senior Minister of State for Health	Koh Poh Koon	23 May 2025	31 May 2026
Senior Minister of State for Health	Tan Kiat How	23 May 2025	Incumbent
Minister of State for Health	Rahayu Mahzam	23 May 2025	Incumbent
Minister of State for Health	Shawn Loh	27 July 2026	Incumbent
Ministry of Home Affairs
Office	Name	Term start	Term end
Minister for Home Affairs	**K. Shanmugam**	23 May 2025	Incumbent
Second Minister for Home Affairs	**Edwin Tong**	23 May 2025	Incumbent
Second Minister for Home Affairs	**Sim Ann**	27 July 2026	Incumbent
Senior Minister of State for Home Affairs	**Faishal Ibrahim** (Note: Faishal Ibrahim was concurrently the Acting Minister-in-charge of Muslim Affairs until 20 July 2026.)	23 May 2025	20 July 2026
Senior Minister of State for Home Affairs	Sim Ann	23 May 2025	26 July 2026
Senior Minister of State for Home Affairs	Goh Pei Ming	27 July 2026	Incumbent
Minister of State for Home Affairs	Goh Pei Ming	23 May 2025	26 July 2026
Minister of State for Home Affairs	Zhulkarnain Abdul Rahim	27 July 2026	Incumbent
Ministry of Law
Office	Name	Term start	Term end
Minister for Law	**Edwin Tong**	23 May 2025	Incumbent
Senior Minister of State for Law	Murali Pillai	23 May 2025	Incumbent
Senior Parliamentary Secretary for Law	Eric Chua	23 May 2025	Incumbent
Minister for Manpower
Office	Name	Term start	Term end
Minister for Manpower	**Tan See Leng**	23 May 2025	26 July 2026
Minister for Manpower	**Jasmin Lau** (Note: In an acting capacity.)	27 July 2026	Incumbent
Senior Minister of State for Manpower	Koh Poh Koon	23 May 2025	31 May 2026
Minister of State for Manpower	Dinesh Vasu Dash	23 May 2025	Incumbent
Minister of State for Manpower	Foo Cexiang	27 July 2026	Incumbent
Senior Parliamentary Secretary for Manpower	Shawn Huang	23 May 2025	Incumbent
Ministry of National Development
Office	Name	Term start	Term end
Minister for National Development	**Chee Hong Tat**	23 May 2025	Incumbent
Second Minister for National Development	**Indranee Rajah**	23 May 2025	Incumbent
Senior Minister of State for National Development	Sun Xueling	23 May 2025	Incumbent
Minister of State for National Development	Alvin Tan	23 May 2025	Incumbent
Senior Parliamentary Secretary for National Development	Syed Harun Alhabsyi	1 October 2025	Incumbent
Ministry of Social and Family Development
Office	Name	Term start	Term end
Minister for Social and Family Development	**Masagos Zulkifli**	23 May 2025	Incumbent
Minister-in-charge of Social Service Integration	**Desmond Lee**	23 May 2025	Incumbent
Minister of State for Social and Family Development	Goh Pei Ming	23 May 2025	26 July 2026
Minister of State for Social and Family Development	Zhulkarnain Abdul Rahim	1 February 2026	26 July 2026
Senior Parliamentary Secretary for Social and Family Development	Eric Chua	23 May 2025	Incumbent
Ministry of Sustainability and the Environment
Office	Name	Term start	Term end
Minister for Sustainability and the Environment	**Grace Fu**	23 May 2025	Incumbent
Senior Minister of State for Sustainability and the Environment	Janil Puthucheary	23 May 2025	Incumbent
Senior Minister of State for Sustainability and the Environment	**Zaqy Mohamad**	23 May 2025	26 July 2026
Senior Parliamentary Secretary for Sustainability and the Environment	Goh Hanyan	23 May 2025	Incumbent
Ministry of Trade and Industry
Office	Name	Term start	Term end
Minister for Trade and Industry	**Gan Kim Yong**	23 May 2025	26 July 2026
Minister for Trade and Industry (Trade)	**Gan Kim Yong**	27 July 2026	Incumbent
Minister for Trade and Industry (Energy and Industry)	**Tan See Leng**	27 July 2026	Incumbent
Minister-in-charge of Energy, and Science and Technology	**Tan See Leng**	23 May 2025	26 July 2026
Minister-in-charge of Trade Relations	**Grace Fu**	23 May 2025	Incumbent
Senior Minister of State for Trade and Industry	Low Yen Ling	23 May 2025	Incumbent
Minister of State for Trade and Industry	Gan Siow Huang	23 May 2025	Incumbent
Minister of State for Trade and Industry	Alvin Tan	23 May 2025	Incumbent
Minister of State for Trade and Industry	Foo Cexiang	27 July 2026	Incumbent
Ministry of Transport
Office	Name	Term start	Term end
Minister for Transport	**Jeffrey Siow**	23 May 2025	Incumbent
Senior Minister of State for Transport	Murali Pillai	23 May 2025	Incumbent
Senior Minister of State for Transport	Sun Xueling	23 May 2025	Incumbent
Minister of State for Transport	Baey Yam Keng	23 May 2025	Incumbent
