= Public Transport Council =

Agency overview
- Formed: 14 August 1987; 39 years ago
- Jurisdiction: Government of Singapore
- Headquarters: 510 Thomson Road, SLF Building #12-03, Singapore 298135
- Agency executives: Janet Ang, Chairman; Leow Yew Chin, Chief Executive
- Parent agency: Ministry of Transport
- Website: Official website
- Agency ID: T08GB0044D

The Public Transport Council (PTC) is an independent regulatory statutory board under the Ministry of Transport of the Government of Singapore established on 14 August 1987 by the Public Transport Council Act of 1987.

PTC regulates the public bus and rapid transit network in areas such as fares and service standards. Moreover, PTC is permitted to grant and alter bus service licences and provides advice to the Ministry of Transportation on matters such as licensee requirements and the imposition of sanctions against licensees who violate such requirements.

== Schemes ==
=== Free Pre-Peak Travel ===
In 2013, the PTC introduced the Free Pre-Peak Travel ( FPPT) scheme to encourage commuters to make their morning travels earlier. The FPPT gave free trips to commuters who exited 18 city area stations before 7.45am on weekdays.

In 2017, after four years of the scheme, about seven percent of morning peak hours travels was shifted out of the morning peak hours. On 30 October 2017, after the 2017 Fare Review Exercise, PTC announced the scheme to be terminated on 29 December 2017.

=== Off-Peak Pass ===
In 2015, the PTC started a trial on the Off-Peak Pass (OPP) scheme which allows passengers unlimited travel during the weekday off peak periods on both the bus and train networks. On 30 October 2017, after the 2017 Fare Review Exercise, PTC announced the trial to be terminated on 29 December 2017.

== Criticisms ==
As the public transport fare regulator, the council was criticised on various occasions when it approved fare hike proposals from public transport operators. Some of its policies are deemed as pro-operators rather than pro-commuters. As such, the Workers' Party called for the dissolution of the council in favour of a not-for-profit corporation in the leadup to the 2006 general elections.

== Fare adjustments ==
From 29 December 2017, commuters who started their journey on the rail network, before 7.45am on weekdays, get a discount of 50 cents or the amount of fare of the rail portion, whichever is lower.

In April 2023, the PTC announced a change in the fare formula in its review which is done every five years. During Parliament in November, Workers' Party's Member of Parliament (MP) Louis Chua and People's Action Party MP, Don Wee, suggested either removing deferred fare increase or freezing fare hike but was rebutted by acting Minister of Transport, Chee Hong Tat, that the proposals were “not sound” and “populist”.

The table chart major changes in fare :

| Date | Change in fare | Notes | Reactions |
|---|---|---|---|
| 1 October 2006 | ▲1.7% | Approved applications from transport operators SBS Transit and SMRT for an overall increase in bus and train fares of 1.7%. PTC justified the increase in fares based on the positive economic outlook in 2006 and a comparison of average public transport fares across cities of Hong Kong, London and New York City which have higher fares. | Critics were however skeptical of PTC's justifications, pointing to flaws in the survey conducted by SMU where three quarters of respondents polled said fares were affordable. |
| 1 April 2009 | ▼4.6% | 4.6% reduction in bus and train fares. The reduction comprises a fare rebate (to 30 June 2010) and a transfer rebate. | |
| 3 July 2010 | ▼2.5% | On 20 April 2010, the PTC granted an overall 2.5% reduction in bus and train fares which took effect on 3 July 2010 together with the introduction of distance fares. | |
| 6 April 2014 | ▲3.2% | The typical fares were increased by 4–6 cents and student fares were increased by 2 cents. New concession schemes were implemented. | |
| 27 December 2015 | ▼1.9% | | |
| 30 December 2016 | ▼4.2% | | |
| 29 December 2018 | ▲4.3% | Fares were raised by 4.3% which took effect on 29 December 2018. | |
| 28 December 2019 | ▲7.0% | Fare increase is the highest percentage jump since 1998, caused by increasing energy costs. | |
| 26 December 2021 | ▲2.2% | The increase is driven by soaring energy costs and a drop in ridership due to COVID-19 pandemic. | |
| 26 December 2022 | ▲2.6% | The fare increase is attributed to soaring energy prices from 2020 to 2021 and increase in manpower costs and inflation. The PTC deferred a 10.6% increase to the next year. | |
| 23 December 2023 | ▲7.0% | The fare increase is due to the revised formula announced in April 2023. The maximum fare adjustment allowed is 22.6%, inclusive of 2022's deferred 10.6% and current year's 12%. The remaining 15.6% allowed increase will be deferred to 2024.The 11 cents increase is the highest increase. Transport operators asked for a full 22.6% fare increase. PTC chief executive Tan Kim Hong said that the old formula should not be used anymore. | |
| 28 December 2024 | ▲6.0% | The fare increase was based on core inflation and wage growth in 2023. The maximum fare adjustment allowed is 18.9%, inclusive of 2023's deferred 15.6% and current year's 3.3%. The remaining 12.9% allowed increase will be deferred to 2025. | |

== See also ==
- Transport in Singapore
- Civil Aviation Authority of Singapore
- Land Transport Authority
- Maritime and Port Authority of Singapore
