= Coordinating Minister for Infrastructure (Singapore) =

Former Senior Cabinet position in the Government of Singapore

- Member of: Cabinet of Singapore; Parliament of Singapore
- Reports to: Prime Minister of Singapore
- Appointer: Prime Minister of Singapore
- Term length: At the Prime Minister's pleasure
- Inaugural holder: Khaw Boon Wan
- Formation: 1 October 2015; 10 years ago
- Final holder: Khaw Boon Wan
- Abolished: 27 July 2020; 6 years ago

The Coordinating Minister for Infrastructure was an appointment in the Cabinet of Singapore. Khaw Boon Wan was the first minister appointed in 2015.

== List of Coordinating Ministers for Infrastructure ==
| No. | Image | Name | Took office | Left office | Political party |
|---|---|---|---|---|---|
| 1 | | Khaw Boon Wan | 1 October 2015 | 27 July 2020 | People's Action Party |
