= Heng Swee Keat =

Singaporean politician (born 1961)

Heng Swee Keat PPA PJG
- 王瑞杰
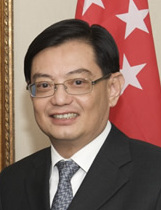
- Heng in 2024

Deputy Prime Minister of Singapore
- In office 1 May 2019 – 22 May 2025 Serving with Lawrence Wong (2022–2024); Gan Kim Yong (2024–2025)
- Prime Minister: Lee Hsien Loong; Lawrence Wong
- Preceded by: Tharman Shanmugaratnam; Teo Chee Hean
- Succeeded by: Gan Kim Yong

Coordinating Minister for Economic Policies
- In office 27 July 2020 – 15 May 2024
- Prime Minister: Lee Hsien Loong
- Preceded by: Tharman Shanmugaratnam
- Succeeded by: Position abolished

7th Chairman of the People's Action Party
- In office 26 November 2022 – 28 May 2025
- Preceded by: Gan Kim Yong
- Succeeded by: Desmond Lee

Minister for Finance
- In office 1 October 2015 – 14 May 2021
- Prime Minister: Lee Hsien Loong
- Second Minister: Lawrence Wong; Indranee Rajah
- Preceded by: Tharman Shanmugaratnam
- Succeeded by: Lawrence Wong

Minister for Education
- In office 21 May 2011 – 30 September 2015
- Prime Minister: Lee Hsien Loong
- Preceded by: Ng Eng Hen
- Succeeded by: Ng Chee Meng (Schools); Ong Ye Kung (Higher Education and Skills)

Member of the Singapore Parliament for East Coast GRC
- In office 10 July 2020 – 15 April 2025
- Preceded by: Lim Swee Say
- Succeeded by: Dinesh Vasu Dash
- Majority: 7,769 (6.78%)

Member of the Singapore Parliament for Tampines GRC
- In office 7 May 2011 – 23 June 2020
- Preceded by: Sin Boon Ann
- Succeeded by: Koh Poh Koon
- Majority: 18,347 (14.44%); 58,282 (44.12%)

Personal details
- Born: 15 April 1961 (age 65) State of Singapore
- Party: People's Action Party (2011-2025)
- Spouse: Chang Hwee Nee (m. 1988)
- Children: 2
- Education: Christ's College, Cambridge (MA); Harvard University (MPA)
- Police career
- Department: Singapore Police Force
- Service years: 1983–1997
- Rank: Assistant Commissioner

Heng Swee Keat (Note: Pronounced /ˈhɛŋ ˌswiː ˈkjɛt/, locally /ˈheɪŋ ˌswiː ˈkjɛt/ or /ˈheɪŋ ˌswiː ˈkjeɪt/) (Note: Chinese: 王瑞杰; pinyin: Wáng Ruìjié; Peng'im: Hêng^{5} Sui^{6}giag^{8}; Pe̍h-ūe-jī: Hêng Sŭi-kia̍k) PPA PJG (born 15 April 1961) is a Singaporean former politician and police officer who served as the Deputy Prime Minister of Singapore between 2019 and 2025. He was the Member of Parliament (MP) for the Tampines Central division of Tampines Group Representation Constituency (GRC) between 2011 and 2020 and the Bedok division of East Coast GRC between 2020 and 2025.

Heng had previously served as Minister for Education between 2011 and 2015, as Minister for Finance between 2015 and 2021, and as Coordinating Minister for Economic Policies between 2020 and 2024.

Prior to entering politics, Heng worked in the Singapore Police Force (SPF), Ministry of Education (MOE), Ministry of Trade and Industry (MTI), and Monetary Authority of Singapore (MAS). He was also the principal private secretary to Senior Minister Lee Kuan Yew between 1997 and 2001.

Heng made his political debut in the 2011 general election as part of a five-member PAP team contesting in Tampines GRC and won with 57.22% of the vote. He was then elected as a Member of Parliament (MP) representing the Tampines Central ward of Tampines GRC and managed to retain his parliamentary seat in the 2015 general election with 72.06% of the vote before switching to contest in East Coast GRC in the 2020 general election.

Heng was poised to succeed Lee Hsien Loong as the fourth prime minister of Singapore following his appointment as Deputy Prime Minister of Singapore in May 2019 and First Assistant Secretary-General of the People's Action Party in November 2018. However, he withdrew himself from consideration in April 2021.

== Education ==
Heng was educated at Raffles Institution before graduating from Christ's College at the University of Cambridge in 1983 with a Bachelor of Arts with honours (later promoted to Master of Arts by seniority) degree in economics after being conferred an overseas scholarship from the Singapore Police Force (SPF) in 1980.

Heng returned to the Singapore Police Force (SPF) and served in various roles, including a five-year stint in the Criminal Investigation Department (CID), before leaving in 1997 with the rank of Assistant Commissioner. He also completed a nine-month Command and Staff Course conducted by the Singapore Armed Forces (SAF).

He subsequently went on to complete a Master of Public Administration degree at Harvard University's John F. Kennedy School of Government in 1993.

== Civil Service career ==
Heng joined the Singapore Administrative Service in 1997 and worked at the Ministry of Education (MOE) before being appointed Principal Private Secretary to Senior Minister Lee Kuan Yew that same year. In 2001, Heng was appointed Permanent Secretary at the Ministry of Trade and Industry (MTI).

From 1 June 2005 to 2 April 2011, he served as managing director of the Monetary Authority of Singapore (MAS), and was named Asia-Pacific Central Bank Governor of the Year by The Banker in February 2011.

== Political career ==
=== 2011–2015 ===
Heng made his political debut in the 2011 general election as part of the five-member PAP team contesting in Tampines GRC, with former Prime Minister Goh Chok Tong claiming that Heng had the potential to become a Cabinet minister. The PAP team won with 57.22% of the vote against the National Solidarity Party and Heng became a Member of Parliament representing the Tampines Central ward of Tampines GRC.

On 18 May 2011, Heng was appointed to the Cabinet as Minister for Education. In August 2012, he was tasked with leading a new ministerial committee to conduct a broad-based review of the government's policies and direction.

=== 2015–2020 ===
During the 2015 general election, Heng led the five-member PAP team contesting in Tampines GRC and won 72.06% of the vote against the National Solidarity Party. After the general election, on 1 October 2015, Heng relinquished his portfolio as Minister for Education and took up the position of Minister for Finance.

On 19 February 2018, Heng announced during a budget speech in Parliament that the government planned to raise the Goods and Services Tax (GST) from 7% to 9% sometime between 2021 and 2025. He said that, "the GST increase is necessary because even after exploring various options to manage our future expenditures through prudent spending, saving and borrowing for infrastructure, there is still a gap".

On 1 May 2018, Heng took over the responsibility of assisting Prime Minister Lee Hsien Loong on the National Research Foundation matters from Deputy Prime Minister Teo Chee Hean. Later that year, on 23 November, he replaced Teo as the first assistant secretary-general of the People's Action Party (PAP) following an election in the party's Central Executive Committee (CEC).

On 1 May 2019, Heng was appointed Deputy Prime Minister, taking over the office which had previously been shared between Teo Chee Hean and Tharman Shanmugaratnam. He also continued to hold the Cabinet portfolio of Minister for Finance. From 1985 to 2019, there had always been two Deputy Prime Ministers sitting concurrently in the Cabinet. The unique circumstance of Heng becoming the sole holder of the office, together with his earlier appointment as the party's first assistant secretary-general, was seen by political observers as paving him the way to becoming the next prime minister.

On 30 June 2020, the Nomination Day for the 2020 general election, Heng announced that he would be contesting in East Coast GRC, after Lim Swee Say stepped down as Member of Parliament of East Coast GRC, which had surprising political observers as he had been expected to run for election in Tampines GRC, which he had been representing for two terms since 2011.

When campaigning, Heng gave what The Economist described as a "disastrous speech" to unveil the PAP's manifesto for East Coast GRC residents called "Together We Care @East Coast", during which "he fumbled his lines so badly that it inspired widespread public ridicule and a bounty of internet memes". The plan became popularly known as the "East Coast Plan" among Singaporeans and on social media. In the campaigning period, a police report was lodged against Heng after comments he had made during a student forum at Nanyang Technological University in 2019 resurfaced. While responding to a question on the possibility of Singapore having an ethnicity from the non-Chinese community as Prime Minister, Heng had said that the older generation was "not ready for a prime minister from a minority race", i.e. a non-Chinese Prime Minister. The police released a statement on 7 July 2020, stating that they had consulted the Attorney-General's Chambers (AGC) and deemed that Heng's remarks had no intent to wound anyone's racial feelings or promote enmity between different races.

On 10 July 2020, the five-member PAP team led by Heng contesting in East Coast GRC won 53.41% of the vote against the Workers' Party, and Heng was elected as the Member of Parliament representing the Bedok ward of East Coast GRC. He continued to hold his Cabinet appointments as Deputy Prime Minister and Minister for Finance after the election.

On 18 February 2020, Heng delivered a budget speech in Parliament when the COVID-19 pandemic had just struck Singapore in January 2020. Referred to as the "Unity Budget", the government budget for 2020 covered measures to cover uncertainties long-term against the backdrop of the COVID-19 pandemic. On 26 March 2020, Heng delivered a second budget speech announcing an additional S$55 billion "Resilience Budget" in response to the worsening situation of the pandemic and to mitigate the economic impact on businesses. It was the second time in Singapore's history since the 2008 financial crisis that past reserves had to be used to fund the initiatives provided. Measures include a cash grant of S$9,000 for eligible self-employed persons as well as S$3,000 for lower-income recipients under the Workfare Income Supplement Scheme as emergency relief against the pandemic. Heng also mentioned that this would likely be the worst contraction ever in the economy since 1965. On 27 July 2020, Heng took up an additional Cabinet appointment as Coordinating Minister for Economic Policies.

After the 2020 general election, Heng had been widely seen as the leading contender to be the next prime minister. However, he withdrew himself from the nomination on 8 April 2021, citing age and health concerns, although some political analysts also attributed his withdrawal to the PAP's marginal win in East Coast GRC at the 2020 general election.

=== 2021–2025 ===
Following a Cabinet reshuffle on 15 May 2021, Heng relinquished his Cabinet portfolio of Minister for Finance, and was succeeded by Lawrence Wong. On 28 May 2021, the Monetary Authority of Singapore announced that Heng had been reappointed as a member of its board for a further term of three years.

Heng has spoken on the Anti-Indian sentiment of Singapore.

Heng has shown strong support for startups and innovation in Singapore. He was the Guest of Honor at a major startup business competition The Lee Kuan Yew Global Business Plan Competition organised by Singapore Management University in 2021 and 2023. In recent years, he has championed initiatives aimed at boosting deep tech innovation and nurturing AI talents.

On 15 May 2024, Heng relinquished his cabinet portfolio of Coordinating Minister for Economic Policies, while retaining the portfolio of Deputy Prime Minister.

On 23 April 2025, the Nomination Day for the 2025 general election, despite his appearance at the nomination center, Heng was not listed in the nomination papers for East Coast GRC nor other constituencies. Heng subsequently confirmed that he is not contesting the election in a Facebook post, and his retirement from politics upon the succession of the new cabinet of Ministers.

== Personal life ==
Not much is known about Heng's personal life, but it was rumoured that his father was Singaporean comedian Heng Kim Ching, professionally known as Wang Sa. In a media interview, he debunked the rumour. He is Chinese Singaporean of Teochew descent.

Heng is married to Chang Hwee Nee, the chief executive officer of the National Heritage Board. They have two children.

On 12 May 2016, Heng collapsed from a stroke during a Cabinet meeting. He was taken to Tan Tock Seng Hospital, where he underwent neurosurgery to relieve pressure in his brain. He was transferred to the intensive care unit after the surgery and discharged on 25 June 2016. He resumed his duties as a Member of Parliament and Minister for Finance on 22 August 2016.

== Honours ==
- Public Administration Medal (PPA) (2001)
- Meritorious Service Medal (PJG) (2010)

== Notes ==
Government offices
Preceded by Koh Yong Guan	Managing Director of the Monetary Authority of Singapore	Succeeded by Ravi Menon
Political offices
Preceded by Ng Eng Hen	Minister for Education	Succeeded by Ng Chee Meng as Minister for Education (Schools)
Preceded by Ng Eng Hen	Minister for Education	Succeeded by Ong Ye Kung as Minister for Education (Higher Education and Skills)
Preceded by Tharman Shanmugaratnam	Minister for Finance	Succeeded by Lawrence Wong
Preceded by Teo Chee Hean; Tharman Shanmugaratnam	Deputy Prime Minister; Serving with: Lawrence Wong (2022–2024); Gan Kim Yong (2024–2025)	Vacant
Parliament of Singapore
Preceded by Sin Boon Ann	Member of Parliament for Tampines GRC (Tampines Central)	Succeeded by Koh Poh Koon
Preceded by Lim Swee Say	Member of Parliament for East Coast GRC (Bedok)	Succeeded by Edwin Tong
Party political offices
Preceded by Gan Kim Yong	Chairman of the People's Action Party	Succeeded by Desmond Lee
