= Lui Tuck Yew =

Singaporean diplomat and former politician

- 吕德耀
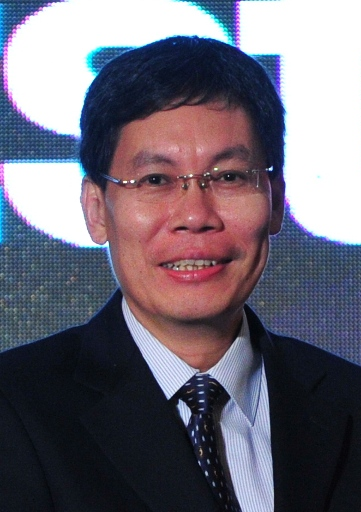
- Lui in 2012

Singapore Ambassador to the United States
- Incumbent
- Assumed office 30 May 2023
- Minister: Vivian Balakrishnan
- Preceded by: Ashok Mirpuri

Singapore Ambassador to China
- In office 31 October 2019 – April 2023
- Minister: Vivian Balakrishnan
- Preceded by: Stanley Loh Ka Leung
- Succeeded by: Peter Tan Hai Chuan

Singapore Ambassador to Japan
- In office 1 June 2017 – 31 October 2019
- Minister: Vivian Balakrishnan
- Preceded by: Chin Siat Yoon
- Succeeded by: Peter Tan Hai Chuan

Second Minister for Defence
- In office 9 April 2015 – 30 September 2015
- Prime Minister: Lee Hsien Loong
- Minister: Ng Eng Hen
- Preceded by: Chan Chun Sing
- Succeeded by: Ong Ye Kung

Minister for Transport
- In office 21 May 2011 – 30 September 2015
- Prime Minister: Lee Hsien Loong
- Preceded by: Raymond Lim
- Succeeded by: Khaw Boon Wan

Minister for Information, Communications and the Arts
- In office 1 November 2010 – 20 May 2011; Acting: 1 April 2009 – 31 October 2010
- Prime Minister: Lee Hsien Loong
- Preceded by: Lee Boon Yang
- Succeeded by: Yaacob Ibrahim

Member of Parliament for Moulmein–Kallang GRC (Moulmein)
- In office 7 May 2011 – 24 August 2015
- Preceded by: Constituency established
- Succeeded by: Constituency abolished
- Majority: 13,107 (17.12%)

Member of Parliament for Tanjong Pagar GRC (Moulmein)
- In office 7 May 2006 – 18 April 2011
- Preceded by: PAP held
- Succeeded by: PAP held
- Majority: N/A (walkover)

Personal details
- Born: Lui Tuck Yew; 16 August 1961 (age 65) State of Singapore
- Party: People's Action Party
- Spouse: Soo Fen
- Children: 2
- Education: Trinity College, Cambridge (BA); Tufts University (MA)

Military service
- Branch/service: Republic of Singapore Navy
- Years of service: 1979–2003
- Rank: Rear-Admiral

Lui Tuck Yew (Note: Chinese: 吕德耀; Jyutping: Leoi^{5} Dak^{1} Jiu^{6}; pinyin: Lǚ Déyào) (born 16 August 1961) is a Singaporean diplomat, former politician and two-star rear-admiral who has been serving as Singapore Ambassador to the United States since 2023. Prior to, Lui served as Singapore Ambassador to China between 2019 and 2023, and Ambassador to Japan between 2017 and 2019.

A member of the governing People's Action Party (PAP), Lui served as the Member of Parliament (MP) representing the Moulmein division of Tanjong Pagar GRC between 2006 and 2011 and later Moulmein–Kallang GRC between 2011 and 2015. He also served in the Cabinet as Minister for Information, Communications and the Arts between 2009 and 2011, Minister for Transport between 2011 and 2015 and Second Minister for Defence in 2015 before retiring from politics.

Prior to entering politics, Lui served in the Republic of Singapore Navy (RSN) and served as Chief of Navy between 1999 and 2003, holding the rank of two-star rear-admiral.

== Education ==
Lui was educated at the Anglo-Chinese School (Primary), Anglo-Chinese School (Barker Road) and Anglo-Chinese Junior College, before he was awarded a Singapore Armed Forces Overseas Scholarship to study at the University of Cambridge, where he read the natural sciences tripos at Trinity College and graduated with a Bachelor of Arts in 1983.

He subsequently completed a Master of Arts degree in international relations at the Fletcher School of Law and Diplomacy at Tufts University in 1994.

== Career ==
Lui began his career in the Republic of Singapore Navy (RSN) and became Chief of Navy in 1999. He left the RSN in 2003 to join the Administrative Service, and was appointed the chief executive officer of the Maritime and Port Authority (MPA). In 2004, he became the Deputy Secretary (Land) at the Ministry of Transport, while continuing to serve concurrently as the chief executive officer of the MPA. In 2005, Lui was appointed the chief executive officer of the Housing Development Board (HDB).

=== Political career ===
Lui made his political debut in the 2006 general election as part of a six-member PAP team contesting in Tanjong Pagar GRC and won uncontested. He was elected as the Member of Parliament (MP) for Tanjong Pagar GRC. During the 2011 general election, Lui switched to contesting in Moulmein–Kallang GRC and won. He was re-elected into Parliament.

Lui was appointed Minister of State for Education on 30 May 2006. On 1 April 2008, he became Senior Minister of State for Education and Senior Minister of State for Information, Communications and the Arts. He was appointed Acting Minister for Information, Communications and the Arts on 1 April 2009, and became a full member of the Cabinet in 2010 and was appointed Second Minister for Transport, assisting Raymond Lim.

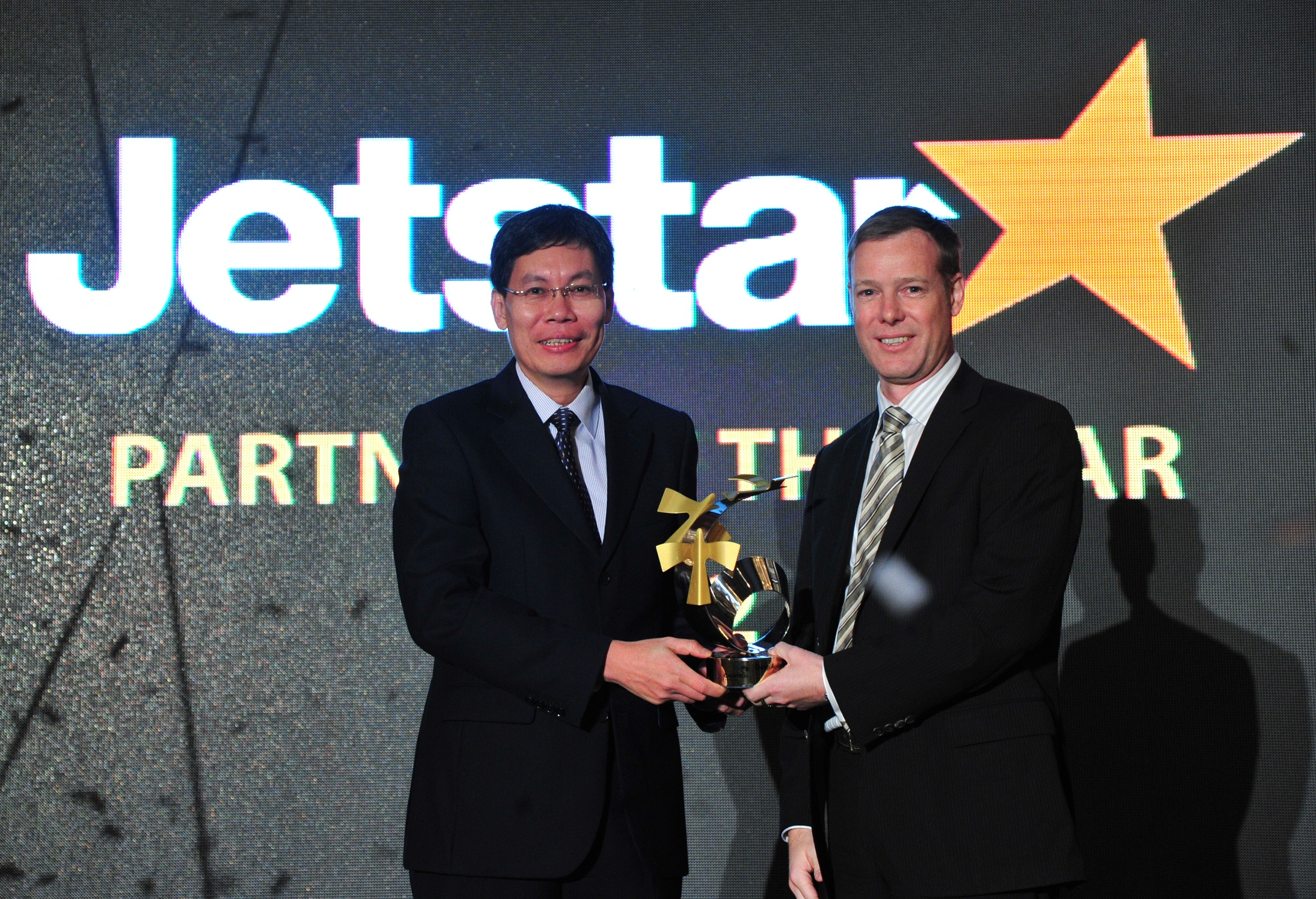
Lui (left), in his capacity as Minister for Transport, presenting the "Partner of the Year" award to Paul Daff, Acting CEO of Jetstar Asia, at the Changi Airlines Awards ceremony in Singapore on 10 May 2012

After the 2011 general election, Lui was appointed Minister for Transport and Second Minister for Foreign Affairs. He relinquished his portfolio at the Foreign Affairs Ministry on 1 August 2012, but remains serving as Minister for Transport.

During his tenure as Minister for Transport, Lui defended the privatisation of the public transport system, explaining that if public transport were to be nationalised, operators would be dependent on government funding as well as operate on a cost recovery basis. This he added, would not spur them to lower transport costs. Lui is adamant that the companies remain financially viable by approving yearly fare hikes.

==== 2011 general election ====
During the 2011 general election, Lui contested in the newly created Moulmein–Kallang GRC and won 58.56% of the vote, against the Workers' Party.

On 11 August 2015, Lui announced his retirement from politics after serving for nine years. Together with former Cabinet ministers Wong Kan Seng, Mah Bow Tan and Raymond Lim, they stepped down from politics after the 2015 general election.

Lui acknowledged the criticisms against him as a result of his management during his tenure as Minister for Transport, and said, "In politics, you need a tender heart and a thick skin, not a hard heart and thin skin. I think my heart, my skin, like all my body parts, are fine."

=== Diplomatic career ===
On 1 June 2017, the Ministry of Foreign Affairs appointed Lui Singapore Ambassador to Japan.

Lui was appointed Singapore Ambassador to China in November 2019. In May 2023, he was appointed as the Singapore Ambassador to USA.

== Personal life ==
Lui is married to Soo Fen. They have two children.

== Notes ==
Political offices
Preceded by Lee Boon Yang	Minister for Information, Communications and the Arts; 2009–2011	Succeeded by Yaacob Ibrahim
Preceded by Raymond Lim	Minister for Transport; 2011–2015	Succeeded by Khaw Boon Wan
Parliament of Singapore
Preceded by Khaw Boon Wan; Chay Wai Chuen; Chong Weng Chiew; Indranee Rajah; Koo Tsai Kee; Lee Kuan Yew	Member of Parliament for Tanjong Pagar GRC; 2006 – 2011; Served alongside: Baey Yam Keng, Sam Tan, Indranee Rajah, Koo Tsai Kee, Lee Kuan Yew	Succeeded by Chan Chun Sing; Lily Neo; Chia Shi-Lu; Indranee Rajah; Lee Kuan Yew
New constituency	Member of Parliament for Moulmein–Kallang GRC; 2011 – 2015; Served alongside: Edwin Tong, Denise Phua, Yaacob Ibrahim	Constituency abolished
Military offices
Preceded by Rear-Admiral Richard Lim Cherng Yih	Chief of the Republic of Singapore Navy; 1999 – 1 April 2003	Succeeded by Rear-Admiral Ronnie Tay
Diplomatic posts
Preceded by Chin Siat Yoon	Singapore Ambassador to Japan; 2017–2019	Succeeded by Peter Tan Hai Chuan
Preceded by Stanley Loh Ka Leung	Singapore Ambassador to China; 2019-2023	Succeeded by Peter Tan Hai Chuan
Preceded by Ashok Mirpuri	Singapore Ambassador to the United States; Since 2023	Succeeded by Incumbent
