= Melvin Yong =

Singaporean politician

The Honourable Melvin Yong
- 杨益财

Member of Parliament for Radin Mas SMC
- Incumbent
- Assumed office 10 July 2020
- Preceded by: Sam Tan
- Majority: 2020: 10,942 (48.02%); 2025: 10,460 (45.6%)

Member of Parliament for Tanjong Pagar GRC
- In office 11 September 2015 – 23 June 2020
- Preceded by: PAP held
- Succeeded by: PAP held
- Majority: 64,637 (55.42%)

Personal details
- Born: Melvin Yong Yik Chye; 19 February 1972 (age 54) Singapore
- Party: People's Action Party
- Children: 2
- Education: Nanyang Technological University (BAcy); University of Leicester (MS)
- Occupation: Politician; trade unionist; police officer
- Police career
- Department: Singapore Police Force
- Service years: 1995–2015
- Rank: Assistant Commissioner

Melvin Yong Yik Chye (Note: Chinese: 杨益财; Pha̍k-fa-sṳ: Yòng Yit-chhòi) (born 19 February 1972) is a Singaporean politician, union leader and former police officer. A member of the governing People's Action Party (PAP), he has been the Member of Parliament (MP) for Radin Mas Single Member Constituency (SMC) since 2020. He had previously represented the Moulmein–Cairnhill division of Tanjong Pagar Group Representation Constituency (GRC) between 2015 and 2020.

Prior to entering politics, Yong had served in the Singapore Police Force (SPF) between 1995 and 2015. He is currently an assistant secretary-general and director at the National Trades Union Congress (NTUC), as well as the executive secretary of the National Transport Workers' Union and United Workers of Electronics & Electrical Industries.

== Education ==
Yong attended The Chinese High School and National Junior College before he was awarded a scholarship from the Singapore Police Force in 1992 to study at Nanyang Technological University, from which he graduated in 1995 with a Bachelor of Accountancy degree.

He subsequently went on to complete a Master of Science degree in criminal justice at the University of Leicester in 2005.

== Police career ==
Yong started his career in the Singapore Police Force (SPF) in 1995 and retired in 2015 with the rank of Assistant Commissioner. During his service, he held various key appointments, including Deputy Director (Planning & Organisation), Director (Administration & Finance), Commander of Clementi Police Division, Deputy Director (Operations), and Director (Public Affairs).

Yong also served on the National Crime Prevention Council and the National Police Cadet Corps Council. He was also vice-chairperson of both the Police Sports Association and the POLWEL Cooperative Society.

== Political career ==
On 19 August 2015, Yong was introduced as a PAP candidate for Tanjong Pagar GRC for the general election later in the same year. He was assigned to the Moulmein–Cairnhill division after the PAP team defeated Singaporeans First (SingFirst) with 77.73% of the vote.

On 7 October 2015, Yong was appointed chairperson of Tanjong Pagar Town Council.

Yong delivered his maiden parliamentary speech at the debate on the President's address; he spoke about tripartism, calling it important and the key economic advantage of Singapore.

In the 2020 general election, Yong was redeployed to Radin Mas SMC to replace retiring incumbent Sam Tan, defeating Kumar Appavoo from the Reform Party (RP) with 74.01% of the vote.

As an MP also in NTUC, Yong is a labour MP, as the term is defined by the media in Singapore. In October 2024, CNA noted that none of the labour MPs filed any questions or spoke during the parliamentary debate concerning a deal, which became controversial and was eventually cancelled after being exposed to the public, to sell a controlling 51% stake in Income Insurance, an NTUC Enterprise subsidiary, to Allianz. The deal was later brought up by Pritam Singh, secretary-general of the Workers' Party (WP), in a rally for the 2025 general election.

Yong was the vice-chairperson of the Transport Government Parliamentary Committee (GPC) between 2020 and 2025. From 2023 to 2025, he was also the chairperson of the Social and Family Development GPC.

In the 2025 general election, Yong stood for reelection in a three-way fight with Appavoo, now under the banner of the People's Alliance for Reform (PAR), as well as independent candidate Darryl Lo, who had claimed that there was no "credible opposition" in the SMC. Yong won reelection with 69.12% of the vote, a decrease from the 74.01% he had garnered in 2020.

== Other career ==
Yong became a People's Association grassroots leader in 2002 when he joined the newly formed Punggol Cove Residents’ Committee as a member. He later became the committee's chairperson from 2005 to 2008 before stepping down to take on appointments in the Punggol North Citizens' Consultative Committee (CCC). Yong was the CCC's treasurer and secretary between 2008 and 2015.

In September 2015, Yong joined NTUC as the director of the Industrial Relations Field.

On 1 January 2016, Yong joined the United Workers of Electronics & Electrical Industries as its deputy executive secretary and subsequently took over from Heng Chee How as the executive secretary on 1 June 2016. In 2018, Yong was elected president of the IndustriALL Singapore Council.

Yong was appointed as a Member of the National Wages Council in 2016.

After a spate of lift breakdowns in late 2016, Yong wrote on the struggles of lift technicians in Singapore on Labourbeat, a blog maintained by NTUC. He subsequently became the chairperson of the Lift & Escalator Sectoral Tripartite Committee to work on a Manpower Development Plan for the lift and escalator industry.

On 1 September 2017, Yong was appointed as a board member of the Land Transport Authority.

Yong, along with Desmond Choo, were appointed as assistant secretaries-general of the National Trades Union Congress on 1 April 2018.

Yong was elected to the Consumers Association of Singapore (CASE) Central Committee in June 2018 and was subsequently elected as Vice President in November 2019. He was later elected President of CASE on 11 June 2021, taking over from Lim Biow Chuan who was President of CASE since 2012.

In September 2021, Yong stated that CASE would be working with major online marketplaces to establish a standardised dispute management framework for the resolution of customer complaints. The framework was jointly launched by Yong and Minister for Trade and Industry, Gan Kim Yong, on 26 November 2021 at a conference which also marked CASE’s 50th anniversary. As of September 2023, Lazada and Shopee had adopted the framework and committed to dispute resolution.

Yong has also advocated for stronger consumer safeguards against unfair practices such as misleading and false claims and pressure sales tactics by calling for more powers to be granted to the Competition and Consumer Commission of Singapore to impose financial penalties and for a mandatory cooling-off period for beauty-related contracts.

Following the increasing popularity of buy now, pay later (BNPL) services among consumers in Singapore, Yong called for limits to be set on both consumers and BNPL service providers, where consumers could set purchase limits for themselves and where there is a limit on the maximum quantum that BNPL providers can levy on consumers in the event of defaults.

== Personal life ==
Yong is married. He and his wife, Connie, have two children.

== Notes ==
Parliament of Singapore
Preceded by Chan Chun Sing; Lily Neo; Chia Shi-Lu; Indranee Rajah; Lee Kuan Yew	Member of Parliament for Tanjong Pagar GRC; Served alongside: Chan Chun Sing, Joan Pereira, Chia Shi-Lu, Indranee Rajah	Succeeded by Chan Chun Sing; Joan Pereira; Alvin Tan; Eric Chua; Indranee Rajah
Preceded by Sam Tan	Member of Parliament for Radin Mas SMC	Incumbent
