= Alvin Tan (politician) =

Singaporean politician

The Honourable Alvin Tan
- 陈圣辉
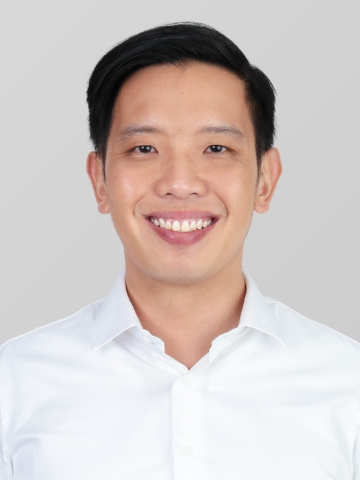
- Official portrait, 2020

Member of Parliament for Tanjong Pagar GRC
- Incumbent
- Assumed office 10 July 2020
- Preceded by: PAP held
- Majority: 75,755 (62.04%)

Personal details
- Born: Alvin Tan Sheng Hui; 30 June 1980 (age 46) Singapore
- Party: People's Action Party
- Children: 2
- Education: University of Sydney (BEc); Harvard University (MPP)
- Occupation: Politician

Military service
- Branch/service: Singapore Army
- Years of service: 2001–2008
- Rank: Captain

Alvin Tan Sheng Hui (Note: Chinese: 陈圣辉; pinyin: Chén Shènghuì) (born 30 June 1980) is a Singaporean politician currently serving as Minister of State for National Development and Minister of State for Trade and Industry. A member of the governing People's Action Party (PAP), he has been the Member of Parliament (MP) representing the Moulmein–Cairnhill division of Tanjong Pagar Group Representation Constituency since 2020.

Prior to entering politics, Tan had worked at various organisations, including the Ministry of Defence (MINDEF), Oxfam, United Nations, Goldman Sachs, Facebook and LinkedIn.

He made his political debut in the 2020 general election as part of a five-member PAP team contesting in Tanjong Pagar GRC and won 63.13% of the vote. He was successfully re-elected in the 2025 general election, and was appointed the Minister of State for National Development and Minister of State for Trade and Industry

== Education ==
Tan attended Catholic High School and Anglo-Chinese Junior College. Despite scoring Cs and Ds for his A-level examinations, he graduated from the University of Sydney with a Bachelor of Economics with first class honours degree under a study award conferred by the Singapore Armed Forces (SAF).

He subsequently went on to complete a Master of Public Policy degree at Harvard University's John F. Kennedy School of Government.

He also received the 2008 Tan Kah Kee Foundation Postgraduate Scholarship and the International and Global Affairs Fellowship from the Belfer Center for Science and International Affairs at Harvard University.

== Career ==
Tan had worked in the private, public and non-profit sectors at various organisations, including the Ministry of Defence (MINDEF), Oxfam and the United Nations (UN). He worked in the investment banking sector at Goldman Sachs in Singapore and Hong Kong between 2010 and 2015. He was also Head of Public Policy, Trust and Safety at Facebook and Head of Public Policy and Economics for the Asia-Pacific region at LinkedIn.

=== Political career ===
Tan made his political debut in the 2020 general election as part of a five-member PAP team contesting in Tanjong Pagar GRC and won 63.13% of the vote against the opposition Progress Singapore Party.

Prior to that, he had been a community volunteer at Kreta Ayer–Kim Seng since 2005 and at Moulmein–Cairnhill since 2019, and had worked with Lily Neo, the Member of Parliament (MP) representing Kreta Ayer–Kim Seng between 1997 and 2020.

After the 2020 general election, Tan was elected as the Member of Parliament (MP) representing the Moulmein–Cairnhill ward of Tanjong Pagar GRC.

On 1 September 2020, Tan was appointed as Minister of State for Culture, Community and Youth (MCCY) and Minister of State for Trade and Industry (MTI). He is also Deputy Chairman of the National Youth Council.

At MTI, he was involved in the recovery of the tourism sector during and after the COVID-19 pandemic, and worked as Co-Chair of the Future Economy Council's Sub-Committee on Advanced Manufacturing and Trade. He also led efforts to sign the Pacific-Alliance Singapore Free Trade Agreement and the Mercosur-Singapore Free Trade Agreement. He also works on strengthening trade and investment links to Sub-Saharan Africa. At MCCY, he worked on the Racial & Religious Harmony Circles, and MentoringSG and set up the SG Mental Well-Being Network. On 22 November 2021, Tan was appointed to the board of the Monetary Authority of Singapore (MAS), where he has been at the forefront of parliamentary proceedings involving MAS bills and issues. In October 2023, he delivered a ministerial statement on the $2.8 billion money-laundering case in Parliament.

In August 2024, Tan, in his position as the then-Minister of State for Culture, Community and Youth, responded to a Parliamentary Question about the proposed deal to sell a controlling 51% stake in homegrown insurer Income Insurance to German insurer Allianz. According to the Hansard, Tan highlighted NTUC Income's position on the deal, that "Income assessed that the deal with Allianz provides the best alignment of interests", and that '[NTUC Income]' said "Allianz has the best alignment with NTUC Income."

In the 2025 general election, Tan remained in the Tanjong Pagar GRC in which his team won 81.02% of the vote against the PAR team led by Han Hui Hui.

Following the 2025 general elections, Tan was appointed the Minister of State for National Development and Minister of State for Trade and Industry.

== Personal life ==
Tan is married with two children.

== Notes ==
Parliament of Singapore
Preceded by Chan Chun Sing; Melvin Yong; Chia Shi-Lu; Indranee Rajah; Joan Pereira	Member of Parliament for Tanjong Pagar GRC; 2020 – present Served alongside: (2020-2025): Chan Chun Sing, Joan Pereira, Eric Chua, Indranee Rajah (2025-present): Chan Chun Sing, Joan Pereira, Foo Cexiang, Rachel Ong	Incumbent
