= Eric Chua =

Singaporean politician

The Honourable Eric Chua PBM
- 蔡瑞隆
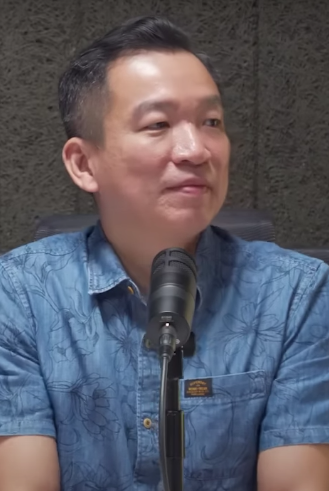
- Chua in 2024

Member of the Singapore Parliament for Queenstown SMC
- Incumbent
- Assumed office 3 May 2025
- Preceded by: Constituency established
- Majority: 16,017 (62.26%)

Member of the Singapore Parliament for Tanjong Pagar GRC
- In office 10 July 2020 – 15 April 2025
- Preceded by: PAP held
- Succeeded by: PAP held
- Majority: 32,470 (26.26%)

Personal details
- Born: Eric Chua Swee Leong; 27 May 1979 (age 47) Singapore
- Party: People's Action Party
- Children: 1
- Occupation: Politician

Eric Chua Swee Leong (Note: Chinese: 蔡瑞隆; Pe̍h-ōe-jī: Chhòa Sūi-liông) PBM (born 27 May 1979) is a Singaporean politician who has been serving as Senior Parliamentary Secretary for Law since 2025 and Senior Parliamentary Secretary for Social and Family Development concurrently since 2022 and formerly Senior Parliamentary Secretary for Culture, Community and Youth from 2022 to 2025. A member of the governing People's Action Party (PAP), he has been the Member of Parliament (MP) for Queenstown Single Member Constituency (SMC) since 2025, and previously the Queenstown division of Tanjong Pagar Group Representation Constituency (GRC) between 2020 and 2025.

Prior to entering politics, Chua served in the Singapore Civil Defence Force (SCDF) and volunteered in grassroots activities with the People's Association (PA) in Tanjong Pagar GRC.

He made his political debut in the 2020 general election as part of a five-member PAP team contesting in Tanjong Pagar GRC and won 63.13% of the vote.

== Education ==
A recipient of the Public Service Commission Local Merit Scholarship, Chua completed a bachelor's degree in communication studies at the Wee Kim Wee School of Communication and Information at Nanyang Technological University. For his postgraduate studies, he received a grant under the Fulbright Program and completed a master's degree in communication management at the Annenberg School for Communication and Journalism at the University of Southern California. He is also an elected member of the Phi Kappa Phi honor society for academic excellence.

== Career ==
=== Civil career ===
Chua had worked for 17 years in the Singapore Civil Defence Force (SCDF) and Ministry of Home Affairs. He held the rank of colonel in the SCDF and had served as head of operations of the 1st SCDF Division and commander of the 3rd SCDF Division. He was also the director of the SGSecure Programme Office.

=== Political career ===
Chua was a grassroots volunteer in Tanjong Pagar GRC for 15 years, focusing on helping youths from poorer family backgrounds, and had been the Chairman of the People's Association Youth Movement's Central Youth Council. Chua received the Commendation Medal in 2017 and the Public Service Medal in 2019.

Chua was announced as a People's Action Party (PAP) candidate contesting as part of the five-member PAP team in Tanjong Pagar GRC during the 2020 general election. After the PAP team won with 63.13% of the vote against the Progress Singapore Party, Chua became a Member of Parliament representing the Queenstown ward of Tanjong Pagar GRC.

On 27 July 2020, he was appointed Parliamentary Secretary at the Ministry of Social and Family Development and Ministry of Culture, Community and Youth. On 13 June 2022, Chua was promoted as Senior Parliamentary Secretary at the Ministry of Social and Family Development and Ministry of Culture, Community and Youth.

In the 2025 general election, Chua contested in the newly carved out Queenstown SMC. He won the election against Mahaboob Batcha from the People's Alliance for Reform with 81.13% of the vote, the largest margin in the election. Chua has served as the Vice-Chairman of the Tanjong Pagar Town Council since 2025.

== Personal life ==
Chua is married and has one child. On 3 February 2022, Chua revealed he tested positive for COVID-19. Chua enjoys listening to jazz, classical, and concert band music in his free time.

== Notes ==
Parliament of Singapore
Preceded by Chan Chun Sing; Joan Pereira; Melvin Yong; Chia Shi-Lu; Indranee Rajah	Member of Parliament for Tanjong Pagar GRC; 2020–2025; Served alongside: Chan Chun Sing, Joan Pereira, Alvin Tan, Indranee Rajah	Succeeded by Chan Chun Sing; Joan Pereira; Alvin Tan; Foo Cexiang; Rachel Ong
New constituency	Member of Parliament for Queenstown SMC; 2025–present	Incumbent
