= Chan Chun Sing =

Singaporean politician (born 1969)

The Honourable Chan Chun Sing
- 陈振声
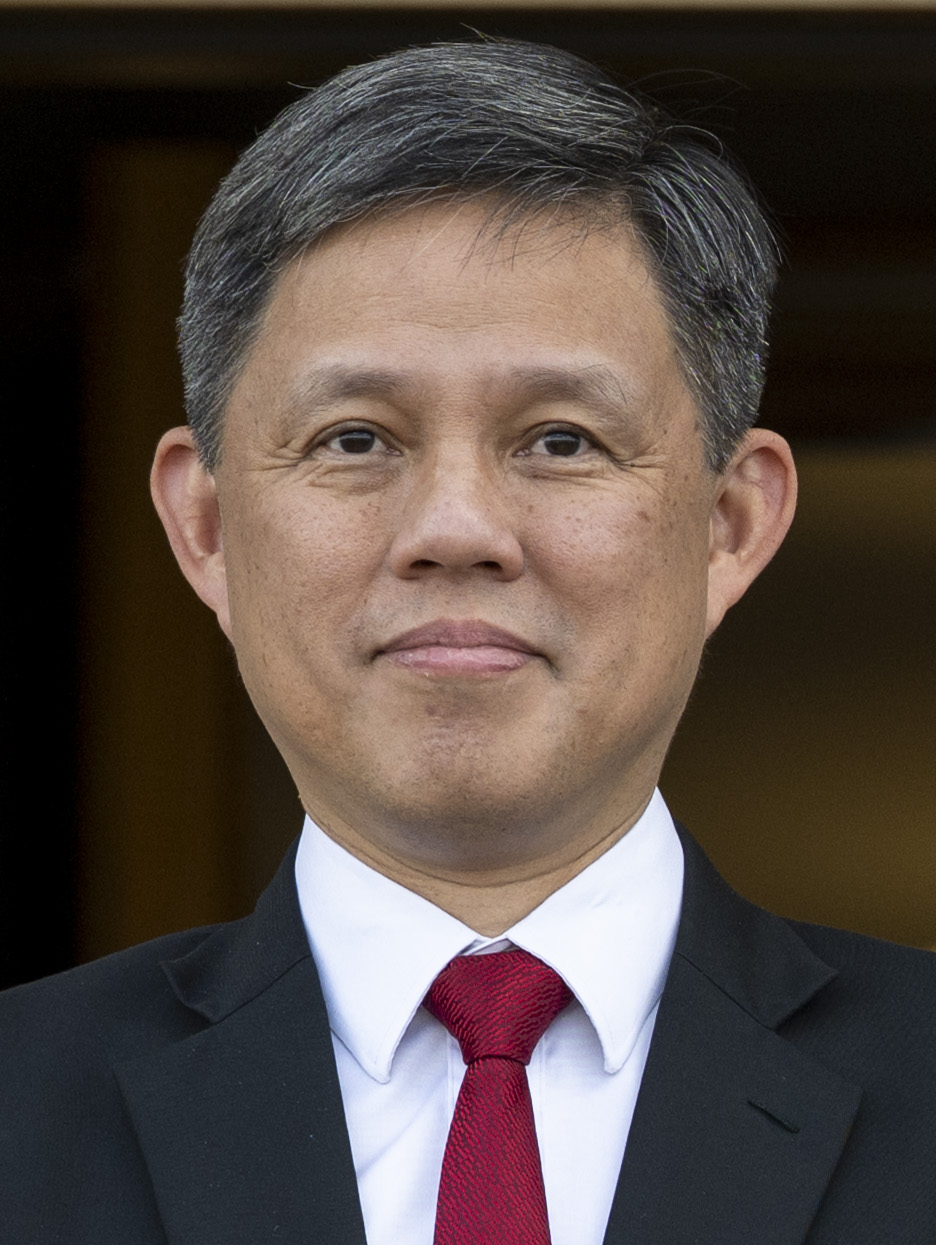
- Chan in 2025

Minister for Defence
- Incumbent
- Assumed office 23 May 2025
- Prime Minister: Lawrence Wong
- Preceded by: Ng Eng Hen

Assistant Secretary-General of the People's Action Party
- Incumbent
- Assumed office 26 November 2022
- Prime Minister: Lawrence Wong

Minister for Education
- In office 15 May 2021 – 22 May 2025
- Prime Minister: Lee Hsien Loong; Lawrence Wong
- Second Minister: Maliki Osman
- Preceded by: Lawrence Wong
- Succeeded by: Desmond Lee

Coordinating Minister for Public Services (concurrently Minister-in-charge of the Public Service since 2018)
- Incumbent
- Assumed office 23 May 2025
- Preceded by: Teo Chee Hean

Minister for Trade and Industry
- In office 1 May 2018 – 14 May 2021
- Prime Minister: Lee Hsien Loong
- Second Minister: Tan See Leng
- Preceded by: Lim Hng Kiang (Trade); S. Iswaran (Industry)
- Succeeded by: Gan Kim Yong

Minister in the Prime Minister's Office
- In office 9 April 2015 – 30 April 2018 Serving with S. Iswaran (until 2015), Desmond Lee and Josephine Teo (from 2017)
- Prime Minister: Lee Hsien Loong
- Succeeded by: Ng Chee Meng; Indranee Rajah

Secretary-General of the National Trades Union Congress
- In office 4 May 2015 – 30 April 2018
- Deputy: Heng Chee How
- Preceded by: Lim Swee Say
- Succeeded by: Ng Chee Meng

Minister for Social and Family Development
- In office 1 November 2012 – 9 April 2015; Acting: 1 November 2012–31 August 2013
- Prime Minister: Lee Hsien Loong
- Preceded by: Office established
- Succeeded by: Tan Chuan-Jin

Second Minister for Defence
- In office 1 September 2013 – 8 April 2015
- Minister: Ng Eng Hen
- Preceded by: Ng Eng Hen (2011)
- Succeeded by: Lui Tuck Yew

Party Whip of the People's Action Party
- In office 28 September 2015 – 5 June 2019
- Preceded by: Gan Kim Yong
- Succeeded by: Janil Puthucheary

Member of the Singapore Parliament for Tanjong Pagar GRC
- Incumbent
- Assumed office 7 May 2011
- Preceded by: PAP held
- Majority: 2011: N/A (walkover); 2015: 64,637 (55.42%); 2020: 78,330 (63.10%); 2025: 75,755 (62.04%)

Personal details
- Born: 1969 (age 56–57) Singapore
- Party: People's Action Party
- Education: Christ's College, Cambridge (MA); Massachusetts Institute of Technology (MBA); US Army Command and General Staff College

Military service
- Branch/service: Singapore Army
- Years of service: 1987–2011
- Rank: Major-General
- Commands: Chief of Army; Chief of Staff – Joint Staff; Chief Infantry Officer; Commander, 9th Division; Head, Joint Plans and Transformation Department; Commander, 10th Singapore Infantry Brigade; Army Attaché in Jakarta; Commanding Officer, 2nd Battalion, Singapore Infantry Regiment

Chan Chun Sing (Note: Chinese: 陈振声; pinyin: Chén Zhènshēng) (Note: IPA: /ˈtʃɑːn ˌtʃʊn ˈsɪŋ/) (born 1969) is a Singaporean politician and former military officer who is serving as Coordinating Minister for Public Services (previously Minister-in-charge of Public Services) and Minister for Defence since 2025. A member of the governing People's Action Party (PAP), he has been the Member of Parliament (MP) for the Buona Vista division of Tanjong Pagar Group Representation Constituency (GRC) since 2011.

A recipient of the President's Scholarship and Singapore Armed Forces Overseas Scholarship, Chan started his career in the Singapore Army under the Singapore Armed Forces in 1987 and held various staff and command positions, and attained the rank Major-General. He served as Chief of Army between 2010 and 2011. He left the Singapore Armed Forces to contest in the 2011 general election.

Before becoming the Minister of Education, he served as Minister for Trade and Industry from 2018 to 2021, Minister in the Prime Minister's Office between 2015 and 2018, Senior Minister of State for Defence between 2012 and 2013, Minister for Social and Family Development between 2012 and 2015, and Minister of State for Information, Communications and the Arts between 2011 and 2012. He also served as the party whip between 2015 and 2019.

== Personal life ==
Chan grew up in a single-parent household. His mother, Kwong Kait Fong, was a machine operator and he has a sister, Chan Siew Yin. He lived in a three-room HDB flat in MacPherson with his mother, grandparents, aunt and sister until he was 30 years old. Chan is married with a daughter and two sons. He is fluent in English, Mandarin and Malay, in addition to his native Cantonese dialect. He is also a fan of Everton F.C.

== Education ==
Chan attended Raffles Institution and Raffles Junior College. Being one of the four top scorers from Raffles Junior College in the A-Level examination in 1987, Chan was awarded the President's Scholarship and Singapore Armed Forces Overseas Scholarship in 1988. He graduated from Christ's College, Cambridge with a bachelor’s degree in economics.

He was subsequently awarded the Lee Kuan Yew Scholarship to pursue a Master of Business Administration degree under the Sloan Fellows programme at the MIT Sloan School of Management, which he completed in 2005.

== Military career ==
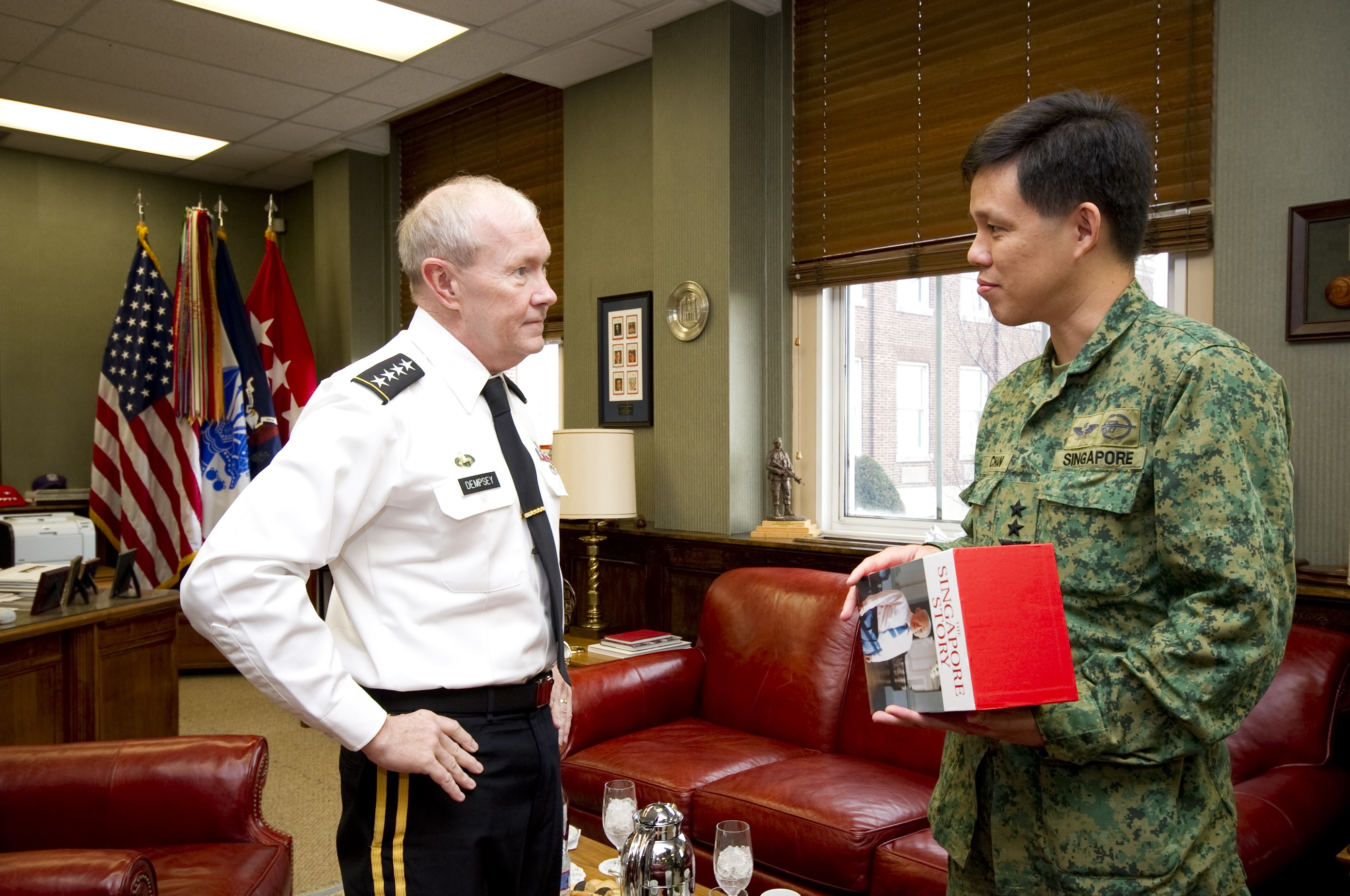
Major-General Chan Chun Sing exchanges gifts with General Martin Dempsey during a visit to TRADOC headquarters on 21 January 2011.

Chan enlisted into the Singapore Army in 1987, and attained the rank Major-General before entering politics in 2011. He has held several appointments and this include: Commanding Officer, 2nd Battalion, Singapore Infantry Regiment between 1998 and 2000; Army Attaché in Jakarta between 2001 and 2003; Commander, 10th Singapore Infantry Brigade between 2003 and 2004; Head, Joint Plans and Transformation Department between 2005 and 2007; Commander, 9th Division and Chief Infantry Officer between 2007 and 2009; and Chief of Staff – Joint Staff between 2009 and 2010.

Chan excelled as a student at the United States Army Command and General Staff College in 1998, and was the first foreign student to be conferred the Distinguished Master Strategist Award in the same year.

On 26 March 2010, Chan was appointed Chief of Army. He stepped down from his post and left the Singapore Armed Forces on 25 March 2011 in order to contest in the 2011 general election.

== Political career ==
Chan made his political debut in the 2011 general election as part of the five-member People's Action Party (PAP) team led by Lee Kuan Yew contesting in Tanjong Pagar GRC. He represented the Buona Vista ward, which was previously held by Lim Swee Say. The PAP team won by an uncontested walkover as none of the opposition parties contested Tanjong Pagar GRC. During the election campaign, Chan used the Hokkien phrase "kee chiu" ("hands up") at a rally to engage the crowd, and the term became a nickname for him.

Following the 2011 general election, Chan was appointed Acting Minister for Community Development, Youth and Sports, and Minister of State for Communications and the Arts. Chan, then 42, was one of the youngest ministers to be appointed to the Cabinet.

On 31 July 2012, Chan relinquished his portfolio in the Ministry of Information, Communications and the Arts and was appointed Senior Minister of State for Defence. Following a restructuring of government ministries in November 2012, he began heading the newly created Ministry of Social and Family Development as Acting Minister. He was promoted to full Minister in September 2013, and concurrently served as Second Minister for Defence.

On 23 January 2015, Chan joined the National Trades Union Congress (NTUC) on a part-time basis; He was appointed as NTUC's deputy secretary-general on 27 January 2015 and joined NTUC full-time from April 2015.

On 1 October 2015, following the 2015 general election, Chan was appointed Deputy Chairman of the People's Association, a role which he held till 2021 before relinquishing it to Edwin Tong. In the same year, Chan was put in charge of leading the PAP team in Tanjong Pagar GRC after Lee Kuan Yew died in March 2015.

On 23 November 2018, Chan succeeded Tharman Shanmugaratnam as the PAP's Second Assistant Secretary-General (alongside Heng Swee Keat). In the lead-up to the 2020 general election, Chan was widely seen as one of the three leading candidates (alongside Heng and Ong Ye Kung) to succeed Lee Hsien Loong as Prime Minister of Singapore.

=== Minister for Social and Family Development ===
Chan has announced three key priorities for his Ministry in the Committee of Supply debate 2014. These priorities are: (i) to maintain the currency and adequacy of Singapore's social support policies, (ii) to deliver integrated social services and (iii) to develop manpower for the social service sector.

Chan launched the first of 23 Social Service Offices to bring social assistance touch points closer to the populace.

The tender evaluation process was revised for commercial childcare centres. The joint effort by Early Childhood Development Agency and Housing Development Board aimed to keep rental costs in HDB estates manageable, and in turn keep childcare programmes affordable.

More infrastructure support to benefit non-Anchor Operators (AOP) setting up preschools in high demand areas and workplaces. Non-AOPs who provide quality and affordable programmes can tap on a Teaching & Learning Resources Grant of up to S$4,000 per year for materials and equipment.

During a Parliament session in 2017, responding to a raised question, he replied that there will be no change to an existing policy, that single mothers will continue to get only eight of the 16 weeks paid maternity leave that married mothers are entitled to, and will still not be entitled to claim a child relief tax incentive.

=== Minister in the Prime Minister's Office ===
Chan held the position of Minister in the Prime Minister's Office (minister without portfolio) from 9 April 2015 to 30 April 2018. He was also Secretary General of the National Trades Union Congress (NTUC) from 4 May 2015 to 30 April 2018.

=== Minister for Trade and Industry ===
On 24 April 2018, it was announced that Chan would succeed Lim Hng Kiang and S. Iswaran as the Minister for Trade and Industry, and would relinquish his NTUC chief portfolio to Ng Chee Meng, effective from 1 May 2018. He also took over responsibility for the Public Service Division on the same day as well.

An audio leak from a closed-door meeting between Singapore Chinese Chamber of Commerce and Industry (SCCCI) members and minister Chan Chun Sing on 18 February 2020 revealed that Chan had used the derogatory Hokkien term "sia suay" (meaning causing embarrassment or disgrace) to describe Singaporeans who were panic buying.

In late May 2020, Chan gave a video interview in which he sought to explain why Singapore was heavily reliant on foreign trade. He cited face masks as an example of a product which Singapore could not produce itself, explaining that "[we] don't have too many sheep in Singapore to produce cotton". Online commentators were quick to point out that cotton is produced by cotton plants rather than from sheep. On 1 June 2020, Chan published a Facebook post apologising for his gaffe and clarified: "To any one (especially young children) watching the video – cotton definitely doesn't come from sheep, it comes from cotton plants!".

Another audio leak happened two days before the 2020 general election. In early July 2020, The Online Citizen published an article along with an audio clip of a speech made by Chan. In the audio clip, Chan mentioned the PAP's results during elections and the restricting space access north of Seletar Airport. Chan later wrote on Facebook that the speech took place in 2019 at a closed-door conversation held after Malaysia imposing a restricted flying zone north of Seletar Airport. He claimed that the audio clip was leaked and circulated for "ill-intent". Following the General Election, Chan retained his portfolio.

=== Minister for Education ===
Following a Cabinet reshuffle on 15 May 2021, Chan was succeeded by Gan Kim Yong as Minister for Trade and Industry while he succeeded Lawrence Wong as Minister for Education. On 19 July 2021, Chan visited River Valley High School, Singapore in response to an attack conducted by a student earlier during the day. A week later, Chan gave a Ministerial Statement in response to the attack. Chan also announced the removal of Common Last Topics from the GCE N, O and A-Levels, and some topics from the final year examinations "to help ease stress" as well as a proposed buddy system to be implemented in schools later on.

==== Mobile Guardian cybersecurity incidents ====
On 5 August 2024, it was announced that the Ministry of Education would be removing the application, Mobile Guardian, from all students’ Personal Learning Devices (PLDs) which were installed with the app as a precaution following an incident on 4 August where 13 000 students from 26 schools had their devices wiped remotely by a perpetrator as part of a cybersecurity breach into Mobile Guardian. Subsequently, MOE terminated their contract with Mobile Guardian on 9 September. This follows a data breach incident in April where data of students and parents from 127 schools were compromised. As well as a human error in configuration on Mobile Guardian’s end which led to a second cybersecurity incident in end July. Chan subsequently gave a statement in Parliament regarding all 3 incidents during a Parliament Sitting on 9 September.

=== Minister for Defence ===
Following to the 2025 general election, Chan was appointed as Defence Minister replacing retiring Ng Eng Hen on 23 May 2025. Chan delivered the closing speech at the 22nd Shangri-la Dialogue on 1 June 2025.

== Notes ==
Political offices
Preceded by Vivian Balakrishnan	Minister for Community Development, Youth and Sports; Acting; 2011–2012	Restructured
New office	Minister for Social and Family Development; 2013–2015; Acting: 2012–2013	Succeeded by Tan Chuan-Jin
Preceded by Lim Swee Say	Minister in the Prime Minister's Office; 2015–2018	Succeeded by Ng Chee Meng; Indranee Rajah
Preceded by Lim Hng Kiang	Minister for Trade and Industry; 2018–2021	Succeeded by Gan Kim Yong
Preceded by Lawrence Wong	Minister for Education; 2021–2025	Succeeded by Desmond Lee
Preceded by Ng Eng Hen	Minister for Defence; 2025–present	Incumbent
New title	Coordinating Minister for Public Services; 2025–present	Incumbent
Parliament of Singapore
Preceded by Lui Tuck Yew; Baey Yam Keng; Sam Tan; Indranee Rajah; Koo Tsai Kee; Lee Kuan Yew	Member of Parliament for Tanjong Pagar GRC; 2011–present Served alongside: (2011-2015): Lily Neo, Chia Shi-Lu, Indranee Rajah, Lee Kuan Yew (2015-2020): Joan Pereira, Melvin Yong, Chia Shi-Lu, Indranee Rajah (2020-2025): Joan Pereira, Alvin Tan, Eric Chua, Indranee Rajah (2025-present): Joan Pereira, Alvin Tan, Foo Cexiang, Rachel Ong	Incumbent
Party political offices
Preceded by Teo Ser Luck	Chairman of Young PAP; 2008–2017	Succeeded by Janil Puthucheary
Trade union offices
Preceded by Lim Swee Say	Secretary-General of the National Trades Union Congress; 2015–2018	Succeeded by Ng Chee Meng
Military offices
Preceded by Neo Kian Hong	Chief of the Singapore Army; 2010–2011	Succeeded by Ravinder Singh
