= Joan Pereira =

Singaporean politician

The Honourable Joan Pereira
- 祖安清心
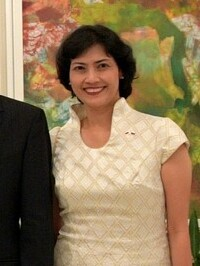
- Pereira in 2018

Member of Parliament for Tanjong Pagar GRC
- Incumbent
- Assumed office 11 September 2015
- Preceded by: PAP held
- Majority: 2015: 64,637 (55.42%); 2020: 32,523 (26.20%); 2025: 75,755 (62.04%)

Personal details
- Born: Joan Cheng Sim Pereira; 3 August 1967 (age 59) Singapore
- Party: People's Action Party
- Spouse: Eric Lum
- Children: 2
- Education: National University of Singapore (BA)
- Occupation: Politician

Joan Cheng Sim Pereira (Note: Chinese: 祖安清心; pinyin: Zǔān Qīngxīn) (born 3 August 1967) is a Singaporean politician. A member of the governing People's Action Party (PAP), she has been the Member of Parliament (MP) representing the Henderson–Dawson division of Tanjong Pagar Group Representation Constituency since 2015.

== Education ==
Pereira was educated at the Convent of the Holy Infant Jesus (CHIJ) and Catholic Junior College before graduating from the National University of Singapore with a Bachelor of Arts degree.

== Career ==
Pereira had served as the assistant general manager at Temasek Cares, the philanthropic arm of Singaporean state-owned multinational investment firm Temasek Holdings. She was previously the director of Family Life and Active Ageing at the People's Association.

=== Political career ===
In 2015, the People's Action Party (PAP) announced that Pereira would contest in the Tanjong Pagar Group Representation Constituency during the 2015 general election. She now serves as the Member of Parliament for Tanjong Pagar GRC. She was then appointed Deputy Chairperson of Social and Family Development Government Parliamentary Committee (GPC) in the 14th Parliament of Singapore. Pereira is part of the Government Parliamentary Committee under Culture, Community and Youth where she serves as deputy chairman since 2025.

== Notes ==
Parliament of Singapore
Preceded by Chan Chun Sing; Lily Neo; Chia Shi-Lu; Indranee Rajah; Lee Kuan Yew	Member of Parliament for Tanjong Pagar GRC; 2015–present Served alongside: (2015-2020): Chan Chun Sing, Melvin Yong, Chia Shi-Lu, Indranee Rajah (2020-2025): Chan Chun Sing, Alvin Tan, Eric Chua, Indranee Rajah (2025-present): Chan Chun Sing, Alvin Tan, Foo Cexiang, Rachel Ong	Incumbent
