= Tan Khoon Yong =

Singaporean feng shui practitioner

Tan Khoon Yong (陈军荣; born 1954) is a fengshui grand master from Singapore. He established Way Chinese Geomancy Centre, now Way Fengshui Group, in 1984. He has conducted numerous seminars, including an annual "Chinese Zodiac & Fengshui Seminar".

== Career ==
Tan learnt fengshui from his father and grandfather.

In 1993, he was appointed the Academic Adviser to the Department of Philosophy at Peking University.

Tan received the Public Service Medal (PBM) in 1999 from Singapore President S.R. Nathan.

Since 2004, Tan has represented Singapore in the International Feng Shui Convention (IFSC).

In 2008, Tan received the title of "Feng Shui Grand Master" from the International Feng Shui Association (IFSA) and is the first feng shui practitioner in Singapore to be awarded this title.

In 2011, Tan gave a presentation 'Unveil the Secrets of Yin Feng Shui' during the International Feng Shui Convention. In July, Tan was invited by French TV show, Echappées Belles, to elaborate on the fengshui of iconic buildings, structures, and areas (Merlion, Singapore River, CBD area, Marina Bay Sands and Mount Faber) in Singapore.

Tan holds the offices of Vice-President of the International Fengshui Association, Vice-Chairman of the Organization for Promoting Global Civilization, and Honorary Council Chairman of the Singapore Association of Writers.

=== Way Fengshui Group ===
In 1984, Tan established Way Chinese Geomancy Centre. The firm was renamed Way Fengshui and offers consultancy services, retails speciality fengshui artefacts, and publishes books and educational materials on fengshui. It also sell items which have been blessed by Tan for between SGD $18 to $88,000. Way Fengshui Lifestyle, the retail arm of Way Fengshui Group, typically sells 20–30 items a day, but during the period leading up to Chinese New Year they can sell up to 100 items per day. The best-selling item is a set of coloured cubes which can help enhance a person's fortune.

In July 2016, Way Fengshui Group received the 2016 Teochew Entrepreneur Award (Promising Award). In October, Way Fengshui Group was awarded the Singapore Prestige Brand Award (Heritage Category).

== Bibliography ==
Grand Master Tan has written or co-authored books related to fengshui, destiny studies, Chinese culture and traditions. Some of his publications include:

- Fengshui: A Guide for Exterior Fengshui (Way Media, 1999)
- The Secrets of the Five Dragons (Times Books International, 2001)
- Hottest Fengshui Tips for Your Home (Way OnNet Group, 2003)
- Hottest Destiny Tips for Your Life (Way OnNet Group, 2004)
- Hidden Dragons in an Urban City: Singapore Feng Shui Insights (Way OnNet Group, 2014)
