= Rachel Ong =

Singaporean politician

The Honourable Rachel Ong
- 王心妍
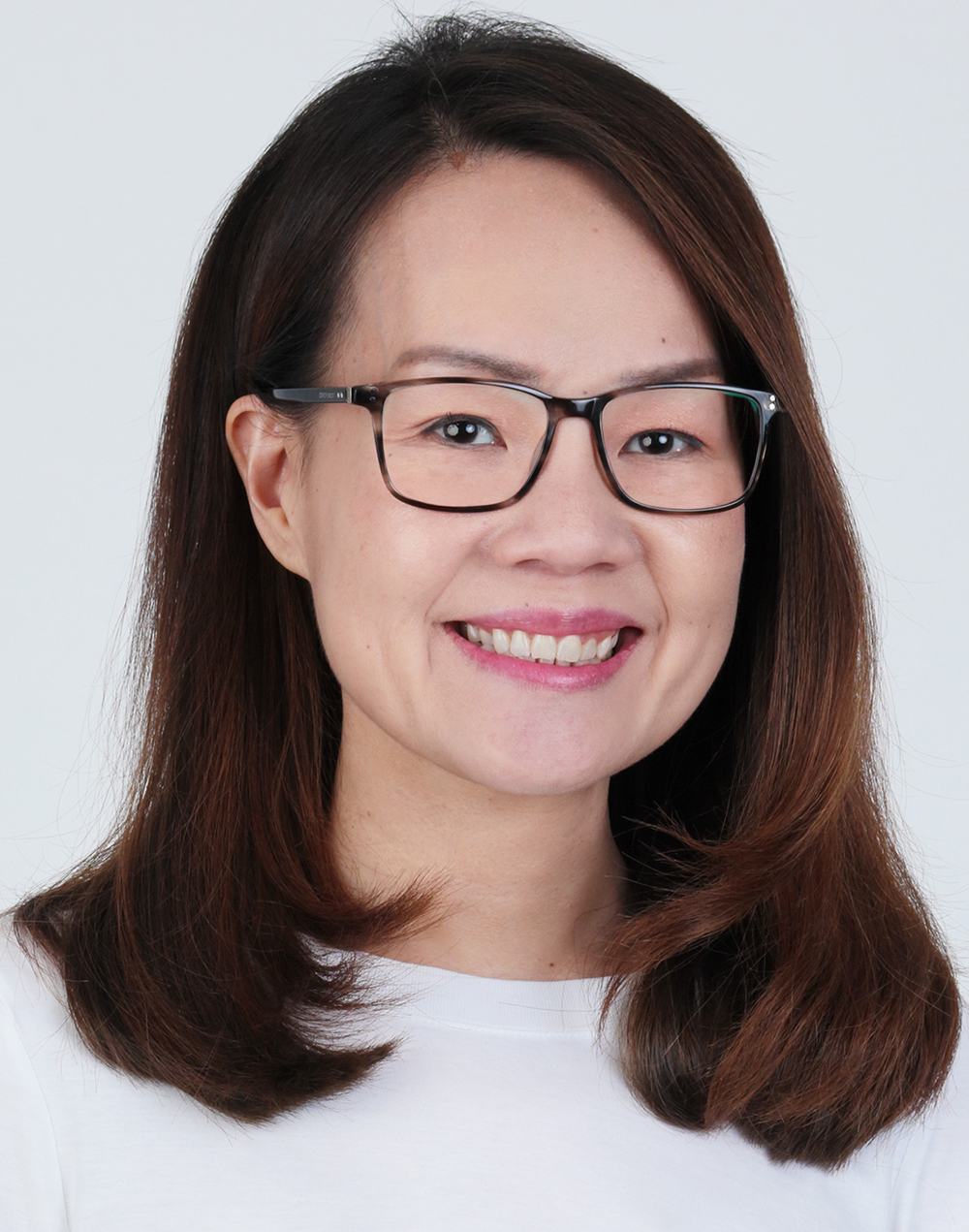
- Official portrait, 2021

Member of the Singapore Parliament for Tanjong Pagar GRC
- Incumbent
- Assumed office 3 May 2025
- Preceded by: PAP held
- Majority: 75,755 (62.04%)

Member of Parliament for West Coast GRC
- In office 10 July 2020 – 15 April 2025
- Preceded by: PAP held
- Succeeded by: Constituency abolished
- Majority: 4,662 (3.36%)

Personal details
- Born: Rachel Ong Sin Yen; 1972 (age 53–54) Singapore
- Party: People's Action Party
- Education: INSEAD; Tsinghua University
- Occupation: Politician; businesswoman

Rachel Ong Sin Yen (Note: Chinese: 王心妍; pinyin: Wáng Xīnyán) (born 1972) is a Singaporean politician and businesswoman. A member of the governing People's Action Party (PAP), she has been the Member of Parliament (MP) representing the Telok Blangah division of Tanjong Pagar Group Representation Constituency (GRC) since 2025. She had previously represented the same division in West Coast GRC between 2020 and 2025.

== Education ==
Ong holds a Master of Business Administration degree from INSEAD and Tsinghua University.

== Career ==
Ong is the founder of ROHEI, a learning and consulting partner operating in Singapore. She is also patron of Trybe, a registered charity aimed at helping youths.

In 2021, Ong began to chair The Purple Parade, Singapore's largest movement for the inclusion of the disabled and the celebration of their abilities.

=== Political career ===
Ong made her political debut in the 2020 general election when she joined a five-member PAP team contesting in West Coast GRC. Said team won with 51.68% of the vote against the Progress Singapore Party (PSP).

Prior to the 2025 general election, Ong's Telok Blangah division was redrawn into Tanjong Pagar GRC; she shifted to said GRC, where the five-member PAP team defeated the People's Alliance for Reform (PAR) with 81.03% of the vote. Ong has served as the Vice–Chairman of the Tanjong Pagar Town Council since 2025.

==== GPC membership ====
Ong has been a member of the Government Parliamentary Committee for Defence and Foreign Affairs since 2020 and the vice-chairperson of that for Social and Family Development; she also served in that for Manpower from 2020 to 2025. She is also a member of the Estimates Committee in Parliament, and a co-chairperson of the PAP Mental Health Group, launched in October 2024.

== Notes ==
Parliament of Singapore
Preceded by Foo Mee Har; Patrick Tay; Lim Hng Kiang; S. Iswaran	Member of Parliament for West Coast GRC; 2020–2025; Served alongside: Foo Mee Har, Desmond Lee, Ang Wei Neng, S. Iswaran	Constituency abolished
Preceded by Chan Chun Sing; Joan Pereira; Eric Chua; Indranee Rajah; Alvin Tan	Member of Parliament for Tanjong Pagar GRC; 2025 – present Served alongside: (2025-present): Chan Chun Sing, Joan Pereira, Foo Cexiang, Alvin Tan	Incumbent
