= Singapore Indian Orchestra and Choir =

Orchestra and choir in Singapore

The Singapore Indian Orchestra & Choir (SIOC) is an orchestra with a companion choir established by the People's Association in 1985 in Singapore. They have staged over 350 performances and are regularly invited to perform at local concerts of festivals in Singapore, Australia and Brunei.

== History ==
Since its inception, SIOC has been run by Lalitha Vaidyanathan. The SIOC Youth wing is run by Vicknesvari Vadivalagan.

The orchestra consists of music students from various art schools and organizations.

== Conductor ==
- Lalitha Vaidyanathan
