= Foo Cexiang =

Singaporean politician

The Honourable Foo Cexiang
- 符策翔

Member of the Singapore Parliament for Tanjong Pagar GRC
- Incumbent
- Assumed office 3 May 2025
- Preceded by: PAP held
- Majority: 75,755 (62.04%)

Personal details
- Born: 11 July 1985 (age 40) Singapore
- Party: People's Action Party

Foo Cexiang (Note: Chinese: 符策翔; pinyin: Fú Cèxiáng) (born 11 July 1985) is a Singaporean politician who was elected to the Parliament of Singapore in the 2025 general election. He represents the Tanjong Pagar Group Representation Constituency as a member of the People's Action Party.

== Career ==
Foo is currently the Vice President (Port Ecosystem Development) at PSA, driving the development of PSA's Supply Chain Hub, as well as PSA's strategies for the Johor-Singapore Special Economic Zone (SEZ) and inter-modal supply chain solutions.

=== Civil career ===
Foo started his career in the Singapore Civil Service, serving over a decade in various ministries and government agencies including JTC Corporation, the Ministry of Trade and Industry, the Ministry of Home Affairs (MHA) and the Ministry of Education (MOE). Foo was a director in the Ministry of Transport (MOT) overseeing private and future mobility, including the transition to electric vehicles in Singapore.

=== Political career ===
At the 2025 general election, Foo was fielded in Tanjong Pagar GRC led by Chan Chun Sing. His team received 81.02% of the vote against a People's Alliance for Reform (PAR) team led by Han Hui Hui that received 18.98%.

== Personal life ==
Foo is married and is a father of three children.

== Notes ==
Parliament of Singapore
Preceded by Chan Chun Sing; Joan Pereira; Eric Chua; Indranee Rajah; Alvin Tan	Member of Parliament for Tanjong Pagar GRC; 2025–present Served alongside: (2025-present): Chan Chun Sing, Joan Pereira, Rachel Ong, Alvin Tan	Incumbent
