= Sam Tan (politician) =

Singaporean politician (born 1958)

Sam Tan PBM
- 陈振泉
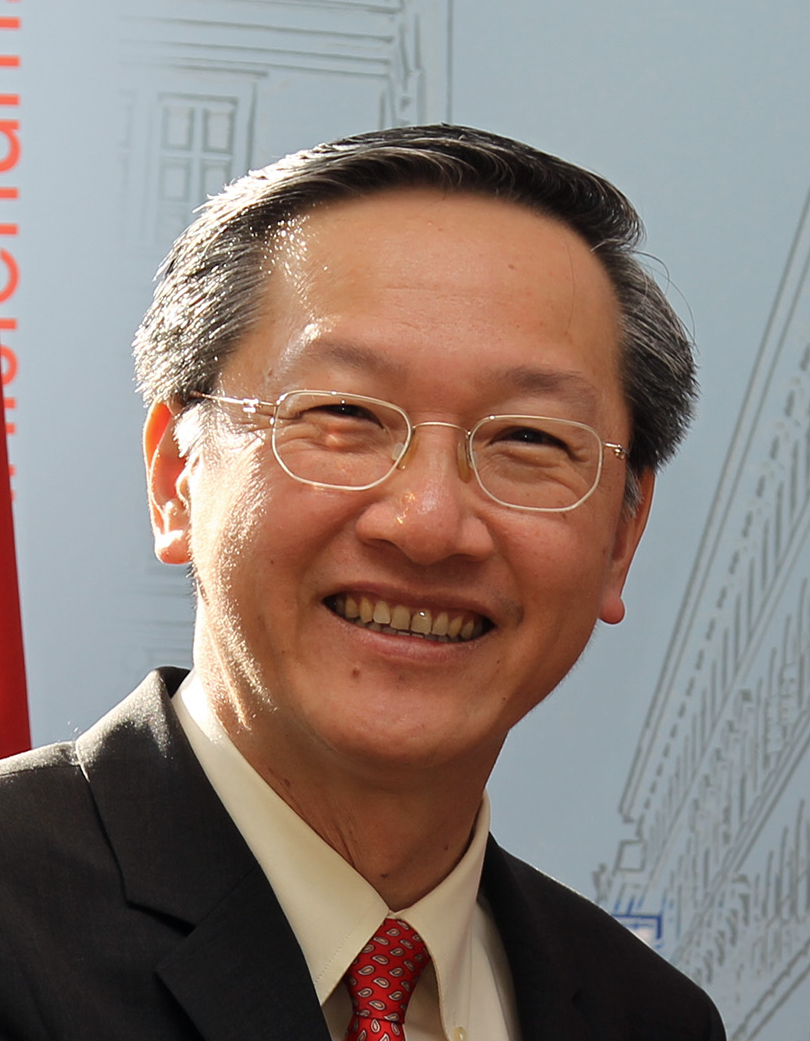
- Tan in 2013

Minister of State for Social and Family Development
- In office 1 May 2018 – 26 July 2020
- Minister: Desmond Lee
- Succeeded by: Sun Xueling

Minister of State for Foreign Affairs
- In office 1 May 2017 – 26 July 2020
- Minister: Vivian Balakrishnan
- Succeeded by: Chee Hong Tat

Minister of State for Manpower
- In office 1 October 2015 – 30 April 2018
- Minister: Lim Swee Say; Josephine Teo
- Succeeded by: Zaqy Mohamad

Deputy Party Whip of the People's Action Party
- In office 28 September 2015 – 6 June 2019
- Party Whip: Chan Chun Sing
- Succeeded by: Sim Ann; Zaqy Mohamad

Minister of State in the Prime Minister's Office
- In office 1 May 2014 – 30 April 2018
- Prime Minister: Lee Hsien Loong

Minister of State for Culture, Community and Youth
- In office 1 May 2014 – 30 September 2015
- Minister: Lawrence Wong

Mayor of Central Singapore District
- In office 27 May 2011 – 26 May 2014
- Prime Minister: Lee Hsien Loong
- Preceded by: Zainudin Nordin
- Succeeded by: Denise Phua

Member of Parliament for Radin Mas SMC
- In office 7 May 2011 – 23 June 2020
- Preceded by: Chong Weng Chiew
- Succeeded by: Melvin Yong

Member of Parliament for Tanjong Pagar GRC
- In office 27 April 2006 – 18 April 2011
- Preceded by: PAP held
- Succeeded by: PAP held

Personal details
- Born: 13 October 1958 (age 68) Colony of Singapore
- Party: People's Action Party
- Education: National University of Singapore (BA)

Sam Tan Chin Siong (Note: Chinese: 陈振泉; pinyin: Chén Zhènquán) (born 13 October 1958) is a Singaporean former politician. A member of the governing People's Action Party, he was the Member of Parliament (MP) for the Radin Mas division of Tanjong Pagar Group Representation Constituency (GRC) between 2006 and 2011 and Radin Mas Single Member Constituency (SMC) between 2011 and 2020.

Tan had served as Minister of State for Culture, Community and Youth in 2014 and 2015, Minister of State in the Prime Minister's Office between 2014 and 2018, Minister of State for Manpower between 2015 and 2018, Minister of State for Foreign Affairs between 2017 and 2020 and Minister of State for Social and Family Development between 2018 and 2020. He had also served as Mayor of Central Singapore District between 2011 and 2014.

== Early life and education ==
Tan attended Tuan Mong High School and Hwa Chong Junior College before graduating from the National University of Singapore in 1983 with a Bachelor of Arts with honours degree.

Tan started his career at the People's Association (PA), where he served as Deputy Executive Director between 1992 and 1997. He subsequently became Executive Director of the Chinese Development Assistance Council (CDAC) in 1997. From 2007 to 2009, he served as the chief executive officer of Business China.

== Political career ==
Tan made his political debut in the 2006 general election contesting in Tanjong Pagar GRC and won by an uncontested walkover.

Tan was appointed Parliamentary Secretary for Trade and Industry, and Parliamentary Secretary for Information, Communications and the Arts concurrently from July 2009 to October 2009. He was subsequently promoted to Senior Parliamentary Secretary in November 2009, and served until May 2011.

During the 2011 general election, Tan contested in the newly created Radin Mas SMC. Tan faced a challenge from veteran Yip Yew Weng of the National Solidarity Party after two other political parties, Reform Party and Singapore Democratic Alliance withdrew in favour of the NSP. Tan won by a large margin, garnering 67.10% of the vote.

Tan was appointed Senior Parliamentary Secretary for Foreign Affairs, and Senior Parliamentary Secretary for Community Development, Youth and Sports in May 2011. He was also appointed Mayor of Central Singapore District. In May 2014, Tan relinquished his position as Mayor and was replaced by Denise Phua after he was appointed as Minister of State in Culture, Community and Youth and Prime Minister's Office. In the 2015 general election, Tan won reelection with 77.25% of the vote against Kumar Appavoo of the Reform Party who won 12.71% and Han Hui Hui an independent candidate with 10.03%.

On 28 September 2015, it was announced that Tan would become Minister of State for Manpower from 1 October 2015.

On 29 June 2020, Tan announced that he would not contest in the 2020 general election.

== Awards ==
- Pingat Bakti Masyarakat (2002)

== Notes ==
Parliament of Singapore
Preceded by Chong Weng Chiew	Member of Parliament for Tanjong Pagar GRC (Radin Mas); 2006 – 2011	Constituency redrawn
New constituency	Member of Parliament for Radin Mas SMC; 2011 – 2020	Succeeded by Melvin Yong
Government offices
Preceded by Zainudin Nordin	Mayor of the Central Singapore district 27 May 2011 – 26 May 2014	Succeeded by Denise Phua
