= Radin Mas Single Member Constituency =

Electoral division in Singapore

Coordinates: 1.28°N 103.82°E

Radin Mas
- Single-member constituency for the Parliament of Singapore
- Region: Central Region, Singapore
- Electorate: 25,567

Current constituency
- Created: 2011; 15 years ago
- Seats: 1
- Party: People's Action Party
- Member: Melvin Yong
- Town Council: Tanjong Pagar
- Created from: Tanjong Pagar GRC

The Radin Mas Single Member Constituency (Note: Malay: Kawasan Undi Perseorangan Radin Mas; Chinese: 拉丁马士单选区; Tamil: ராடின் மாஸ் தனித்தொகுதி) is a single-member constituency (SMC) situated in central Singapore. It is managed by Tanjong Pagar Town Council (TPTC). The current Member of Parliament (MP) for the constituency is Melvin Yong from the People's Action Party (PAP).

== History ==
Radin Mas SMC was created prior to the 2011 general election from Tanjong Pagar Group Representation Constituency (GRC), which it had previously belonged to as a division. Sam Tan, the incumbent PAP MP for the division, stood for reelection, defeating Yip Yew Weng from the National Solidarity Party (NSP) with 67.1% of the vote.

In the 2015 general election, blogger Han Hui Hui ran as an independent candidate for the constituency. She won 10.03% of the vote, losing her election deposit of S$14,500 in the process for not winning at least 12.5% of the vote. Tan, on the other hand, retained the SMC with an improved 77.25% of the vote in a three-cornered fight.

Prior to the 2020 general election, Tan retired from politics. Melvin Yong, the incumbent MP for the Moulmein–Cairnhill division of Tanjong Pagar GRC, was fielded by the PAP to retain the SMC; he garnered 74.01% of the vote, defeating Kumar Appavoo, candidate for the Reform Party (RP), who had been contesting the SMC since 2015.

In the 2025 general election, another three-cornered fight occurred in Radin Mas SMC after Darryl Lo, an independent candidate, ran in the constituency, claiming that there was no "credible opposition" in the constituency. He won 23.52% of the vote, while Appavoo, now under the banner of the People's Alliance for Reform (PAR), a political coalition, lost his $13,500 deposit with 7.36% of the vote. Yong won reelection with 69.12% of the vote.

== Member of Parliament ==
Interactive map of Radin Mas SMC as of the 2025 general election

Year	Member	Party
Formation
2011	Sam Tan	PAP
2015	Sam Tan	PAP
2020	Melvin Yong	PAP
2025	Melvin Yong	PAP

== Electoral results ==
Note: The Elections Department does not include rejected votes when calculating the vote shares of candidates. Hence, all candidates' vote shares will total to 100% at any given election (may not appear so in multi-way contests due to rounding).

=== Elections in 2010s ===
General Election 2011
Party	Candidate	Votes	%
PAP	Sam Tan	18,609	67.10
NSP	Yip Yew Weng	9,123	32.90
Majority		9,486	34.20
Total valid votes		27,732	97.64
Rejected ballots		669	2.36
Turnout		28,401	91.57
Registered electors		31,014	
PAP win (new seat)			

General Election 2015
Party	Candidate	Votes	%	±%
PAP	Sam Tan	20,246	77.25	▲10.15
RP	Kumar Appavoo	3,333	12.72	N/A
Independent	Han Hui Hui	2,630	10.03	N/A
Majority		16,913	64.53	▲30.33
Total valid votes		26,209	97.15	▼0.49
Rejected ballots		769	2.85	▲0.49
Turnout		26,978	93.33	▲1.76
Registered electors		28,906		▼7.29
PAP hold		Swing	▲10.15	

=== Elections in 2020s ===
General Election 2020
Party	Candidate	Votes	%	±%
PAP	Melvin Yong	16,864	74.01	▼3.24
RP	Kumar Appavoo	5,922	25.99	▲13.28
Majority		10,942	48.02	▼16.52
Total valid votes		22,786	96.53	▼0.62
Rejected ballots		818	3.47	▲0.62
Turnout		23,604	94.68	▲1.43
Registered electors		24,931		▼15.94
PAP hold		Swing	▼3.24	

General Election 2025
Party	Candidate	Votes	%	±%
PAP	Melvin Yong	15,854	69.12	▼4.89
Independent	Darryl Lo	5,394	23.52	N/A
PAR	Kumar Appavoo	1,689	7.36	N/A
Majority		10,460	45.60	▼2.42
Total valid votes		22,937	98.09	▲1.56
Rejected ballots		446	1.91	▼1.56
Turnout		23,383	91.46	▼3.22
Registered electors		25,567		▲2.55
PAP hold		Swing	▼4.89	
