= Queenstown Single Member Constituency =

Electoral division in Singapore

Queenstown
- Single-member constituency for the Parliament of Singapore
- Region: Central Region, Singapore
- Electorate: 28,911

Current constituency
- Created: 2025; 1 year ago
- Seats: 1
- Party: People’s Action Party
- Member: Eric Chua
- Town Council: Tanjong Pagar
- Created from: Tanjong Pagar GRC

The Queenstown Single Member Constituency (Note: Malay: Kawasan Undi Perseorangan Queenstown; Chinese: 皇镇单选区; Tamil: குவீன்ஸ்டவுன் தனித்தொகுதி) is a single-member constituency (SMC) situated in central Singapore. It is managed by Tanjong Pagar Town Council (TPTC). The current Member of Parliament (MP) for the constituency is Eric Chua from the People's Action Party (PAP).

== History ==
Prior to the 2025 general election, Queenstown SMC was carved out of Tanjong Pagar GRC, which it had belonged to as a division.

The PAP fielded Eric Chua, the incumbent MP for the Queenstown division of Tanjong Pagar GRC, to stand for reelection in the SMC. He defeated Mahaboob Batcha from the People's Alliance for Reform (PAR) with 81.13% of the vote, the largest PAP vote share in a constituency in the general election.

== Members of Parliament ==
Interactive map of Queenstown SMC as of the 2025 general election

Year	Member	Party
Formation
2025	Eric Chua	PAP

== Electoral results ==
Note: The Elections Department does not include rejected votes when calculating the vote shares of candidates. Hence, all candidates' vote shares will total to 100% at any given election (may not appear so in multi-way contests due to rounding).

=== Elections in 2020s ===
General Election 2025
Party	Candidate	Votes	%
PAP	Eric Chua	20,900	81.13
PAR	Mahaboob Batcha	4,883	18.87
Majority		16,017	62.26
Total valid votes		25,873	97.35
Rejected ballots		705	2.65
Turnout		26,578	91.93
Registered electors		28,911	
PAP win (new seat)			
