= List of ambassadors of Singapore to China =

Coordinates: 39.911346°N 116.444377°E

Singapore Ambassador to China
- 新加坡駐華大使
- Incumbent; Peter Tan Hai Chuan since 30 May 2023
- Inaugural holder: Cheng Tong Fatt
- Formation: 3 October 1990; 35 years ago

The Singapore ambassador to China (traditional Chinese: 新加坡駐華大使; simplified Chinese: 新加坡驻华大使; pinyin: Xīnjiāpō Zhùhuá Dàshǐ) is the official representative of the Republic of Singapore to the People's Republic of China.

Singapore and China established formal diplomatic relations on 3 October 1990.

== List of representatives ==
#	Name	Office	Term start date	Term end date	Time in office	Ref.
1	Wong Meng Quang	Charge d’Affaires				
2	Cheng Tong Fatt	Ambassador	1991	1998		
3	Chin Siat-Yoon	Ambassador		1 March 2012		
4	Stanley Loh Ka Leung	Ambassador	March 2012	17 November 2019		
5	Lui Tuck Yew	Ambassador	18 November 2019	30 May 2023	3 years, 194 days	
6	Peter Tan Hai Chuan	Ambassador	31 May 2023	Incumbent	3 years, 100 days	

== See also ==
- China–Singapore relations
- List of ambassadors of China to Singapore
- List of ambassadors of Singapore
