= Coordinating Minister for Public Services =

Senior Cabinet position in the Government of Singapore

- Incumbent; Chan Chun Sing since 23 May 2025
- Member of: Cabinet of Singapore; Parliament of Singapore
- Reports to: Prime Minister of Singapore
- Appointer: Prime Minister of Singapore
- Term length: At the Prime Minister's pleasure
- Precursor: Minister-in-charge of Public Service
- Inaugural holder: Chan Chun Sing
- Formation: 23 May 2025; 15 months ago

The Coordinating Minister for Public Services is an appointment in the Cabinet of Singapore. Chan Chun Sing was the first minister appointed in May 2025.

== List of Coordinating Ministers for Public Services ==
No.	Image	Name	Took office	Left office	Political party
1		Chan Chun Sing	23 May 2025		People's Action Party
