= Koo Tsai Kee =

Singaporean politician

- 顾蔡矶

Member of the Singapore Parliament for Tanjong Pagar Group Representation Constituency
- In office 1991 - 2011
- Preceded by: Constituency established
- Succeeded by: PAP held
- Majority: 1991: N/A (walkover); 1997: N/A (walkover); 2001: N/A (walkover); 2006: N/A (walkover)

Personal details
- Born: Koo Tsai Kee; 29 November 1954 (age 71) Colony of Singapore
- Party: People's Action Party
- Children: 2
- Education: Raffles Junior College; University of Newcastle; University of New South Wales; University College London
- Occupation: Associate Professor
- Profession: Academic

Koo Tsai Kee (Note: Chinese: 顾蔡矶; Pha̍k-fa-sṳ: Ku Chhai-kî; pinyin: Gù Càijī) (born 29 November 1954) is a Singaporean associate professor and former politician. He was a Member of Parliament (MP) from 1991 to 2011, representing the Tiong Bahru division under the Tanjong Pagar Group Representation Constituency (GRC).

== Education ==
Koo was educated in Raffles Institution and was a Colombo Plan scholar. He holds a Bachelor of Surveying with first class honours from the universities of Newcastle and New South Wales. He also attended University College London and has a Graduate Diploma in photogrammetry, Master of Science and Master of Philosophy.

== Political career ==
Koo entered politics in 1991, when he was elected via walkover as an MP for Tanjong Pagar GRC.

In 1995, Koo became a parliamentary secretary and was promoted to senior parliamentary secretary in 1999. As parliamentary secretary, he had worked in various ministries, including Finance, National Development, Defence, and Environment and Water Resources. Koo was promoted to Minister of State in the Ministry of Defence in May 2006.

Koo is an associate professor at Nanyang Technological University (NTU), and has been on no-pay leave since 1999.
