= Desmond Lee =

Desmond Lee may refer to:

- Desmond Lee (classical scholar) (1908–1993), English classical scholar
- Desmond Lee (Singaporean politician) (born 1976), Singaporean politician
- Desmond Lee (Hong Kong politician) (born 1944), Hong Kong politician
- Desmond Lee (basketball) (born 1990), American basketball player
- Des Lee, musician in The Miami Showband

== See also ==
- Desmond Lee-Wortley, character in The Adventure of the Christmas Pudding
