= Tanjong Pagar Group Representation Constituency =

Electoral division in Singapore

Tanjong Pagar
- Group Representation constituency for the Parliament of Singapore
- Region: Central Region, Singapore
- Electorate: 140,194

Current constituency
- Created: 1991; 35 years ago
- Seats: 5
- Party: People's Action Party
- Members: Alvin Tan; Chan Chun Sing; Foo Cexiang; Joan Pereira; Rachel Ong
- Town Council: Tanjong Pagar
- Created from: Tiong Bahru GRC; Tanjong Pagar SMC; Telok Blangah SMC

The Tanjong Pagar Group Representation Constituency is a five-member group representation constituency (GRC) in central Singapore. It has five divisions: Buona Vista, Telok Blangah, Moulmein–Cairnhill, Tanjong Pagar–Tiong Bahru and Henderson–Dawson, managed by Tanjong Pagar Town Council. The current Members of Parliament (MPs) for the constituency are Alvin Tan, Coordinating Minister for Public Services and Minister of Defence Chan Chun Sing, Foo Cexiang, Joan Pereira and Rachel Ong from the governing People's Action Party (PAP).

Tanjong Pagar GRC covers the second-largest area of downtown Singapore, after Jalan Besar GRC.

== History ==
Tanjong Pagar GRC was created prior to the 1991 general election from Tiong Bahru GRC and the single-member constituencies (SMCs) of Telok Blangah and Tanjong Pagar. It was assigned four MPs, as with all GRCs at that election.

During the 1997 Singaporean general election, Tanjong Pagar GRC absorbed the Brickworks and Queenstown divisions of Brickworks GRC and Bukit Merah, Buona Vista and Leng Kee SMCs. The Telok Blangah division was carved out to West Coast GRC. Due to the expansion of the GRC, the number of seats was increased to six.

The GRC was notable for its repeated walkovers since its formation, with the last being in the 2011 general election. That year, the five-member Tanjong Pagar GRC was the only constituency to be uncontested; a team of independent candidates had been disqualified for submitting their nomination papers late.

In the 2015 general election, a team from Singaporeans First (SingFirst), led by Ang Yong Guan and Tan Jee Say, contested the GRC in the first contest the PAP faced there. The PAP team, led by anchor minister (Note: A full Cabinet minister leading the PAP team in a GRC.) Chan Chun Sing, won 77.71% of the vote.

In the 2020 general election, the Progress Singapore Party (PSP) contested the GRC; the PAP team, led by Chan and Indranee Rajah, won 63.1% of the vote.

Prior to the 2025 general election, Tanjong Pagar GRC absorbed the Dover and Telok Blangah estates of the defunct West Coast GRC. To maintain the former as a five-member GRC, its electorate was reduced by carving out the Queenstown division to form a new Queenstown SMC. Indranee left to lead the PAP team for Pasir Ris–Changi GRC. In the election, the PAP won 81.02% of the vote against the People's Alliance for Reform (PAR), the best result for the former in a GRC since the creation of GRCs in 1988.

== Members of Parliament ==
Divisions or wards of Tanjong Pagar GRC as of the 2025 general election:
1 Buona Vista
2 Henderson-Dawson
3 Moulmein-Cairnhill
4 Tanjong Pagar-Tiong Bahru
5 Telok Blangah

Year	Division	Members of Parliament	Party
Formation
1991	Radin Mas; Tiong Bahru; Tanjong Pagar; Telok Blangah	S. Vasoo; Koo Tsai Kee; Lee Kuan Yew; Lim Hng Kiang	PAP
1997	Buona Vista; Leng Kee; Queenstown; Radin Mas; Tiong Bahru; Tanjong Pagar	Lim Swee Say; Ow Chin Hock; Chay Wai Chuen; S. Vasoo; Koo Tsai Kee; Lee Kuan Yew	PAP
2001	Moulmein; Queenstown; Radin Mas; Tanglin–Cairnhill; Tiong Bahru; Tanjong Pagar	Khaw Boon Wan; Chay Wai Chuen; Chong Weng Chiew; Indranee Rajah; Koo Tsai Kee; Lee Kuan Yew	PAP
2006	Moulmein; Queenstown; Radin Mas; Tanglin–Cairnhill; Tiong Bahru; Tanjong Pagar	Lui Tuck Yew; Baey Yam Keng; Sam Tan; Indranee Rajah; Koo Tsai Kee; Lee Kuan Yew	PAP
2011	Buona Vista; Kreta Ayer–Kim Seng; Queenstown; Tanglin–Cairnhill; Tanjong Pagar–Tiong Bahru	Chan Chun Sing; Lily Neo; Chia Shi-Lu; Indranee Rajah; Lee Kuan Yew	PAP
2015	Buona Vista; Henderson–Dawson; Moulmein–Cairnhill; Queenstown; Tanjong Pagar–Tiong Bahru	Chan Chun Sing; Joan Pereira; Melvin Yong; Chia Shi-Lu; Indranee Rajah	PAP
2020	Buona Vista; Henderson–Dawson; Moulmein–Cairnhill; Queenstown; Tanjong Pagar–Tiong Bahru	Chan Chun Sing; Joan Pereira; Alvin Tan; Eric Chua; Indranee Rajah	PAP
2025	Buona Vista; Henderson–Dawson; Moulmein–Cairnhill; Tanjong Pagar–Tiong Bahru; Telok Blangah	Chan Chun Sing; Joan Pereira; Alvin Tan; Foo Cexiang; Rachel Ong	PAP

== Electoral results ==
Note: The Elections Department does not include rejected votes when calculating the vote shares of candidates. Hence, all candidates' vote shares will total to 100% at any given election (may not appear so in multi-way contests due to rounding).

=== Elections in 1990s ===
General Election 1991: Tanjong Pagar GRC
Party	Candidate	Votes	%
PAP	S. Vasoo; Koo Tsai Kee; Lee Kuan Yew; Lim Hng Kiang	Unopposed	
Registered electors		86,944	
PAP win (new seat)			

General Election 1997: Tanjong Pagar GRC
Party	Candidate	Votes	%	±%
PAP	Lim Swee Say; Ow Chin Hock; Chay Wai Chuen; S. Vasoo; Koo Tsai Kee; Lee Kuan Yew	Unopposed		
Registered electors		141,520		
PAP hold				

=== Elections in 2000s ===
General Election 2001: Tanjong Pagar GRC
Party	Candidate	Votes	%	±%
PAP	Khaw Boon Wan; Chay Wai Chuen; Chong Weng Chiew; Indranee Rajah; Koo Tsai Kee; Lee Kuan Yew	Unopposed		
Registered electors		141,150		
PAP hold				

General Election 2006: Tanjong Pagar GRC
Party	Candidate	Votes	%	±%
PAP	Lui Tuck Yew; Baey Yam Keng; Sam Tan; Indranee Rajah; Koo Tsai Kee; Lee Kuan Yew	Unopposed		
Registered electors		148,141		
PAP hold				

=== Elections in 2010s ===
General Election 2011: Tanjong Pagar GRC
Party	Candidate	Votes	%	±%
PAP	Chan Chun Sing; Lily Neo; Chia Shi-Lu; Indranee Rajah; Lee Kuan Yew	Unopposed		
Registered electors		139,771		
PAP hold				

General Election 2015: Tanjong Pagar GRC
Party	Candidate	Votes	%	±%
PAP	Chan Chun Sing Chia Shi-Lu Indranee Rajah Joan Pereira Melvin Yong	90,635	77.71	N/A
SingFirst	Ang Yong Guan Chirag Praful Desai Melvyn Chiu Mohamad Fahmi Bin Ahmad Rais Tan Jee Say	25,998	22.29	N/A
Majority		64,637	55.42	N/A
Total valid votes		116,633	97.98	
Rejected ballots		2,405	2.02	N/A
Turnout		119,038	91.04	N/A
Registered electors		130,752		
PAP hold		Swing	N/A	

=== Elections in 2020s ===
General Election 2020
Party	Candidate	Votes	%	±%
PAP	Alvin Tan Chan Chun Sing Eric Chua Indranee Rajah Joan Pereira	78,330	63.10	▼14.61
PSP	Abas Kasmani Harish Pillay Michael Chua Terence Soon Wendy Low	45,807	36.90	N/A
Majority		32,523	26.20	▼29.22
Total valid votes		124,137	98.47	▲0.49
Rejected ballots		1,933	1.53	▼0.49
Turnout		126,070	93.74	▲2.70
Registered electors		134,494		
PAP hold		Swing	▼14.61	

General Election 2025
Party	Candidate	Votes	%	±%
PAP	Alvin Tan Chan Chun Sing Foo Cexiang Joan Pereira Rachel Ong	98,924	81.02	▲17.92
PAR	Han Hui Hui Nadarajan Selvamani Prabu Ramachandran Rickson Giauw Soh Lian Chye	23,169	18.98	N/A
Majority		75,755	62.04	▲35.84
Total valid votes		122,093	97.07	▼1.40
Rejected ballots		3,681	2.93	▲1.40
Turnout		125,774	89.71	▼4.03
Registered electors		140,194		▲4.24
PAP hold		Swing	▲17.92	
