= Han Hui Hui =

Singaporean blogger and politician (born 1991)

- 韩慧慧
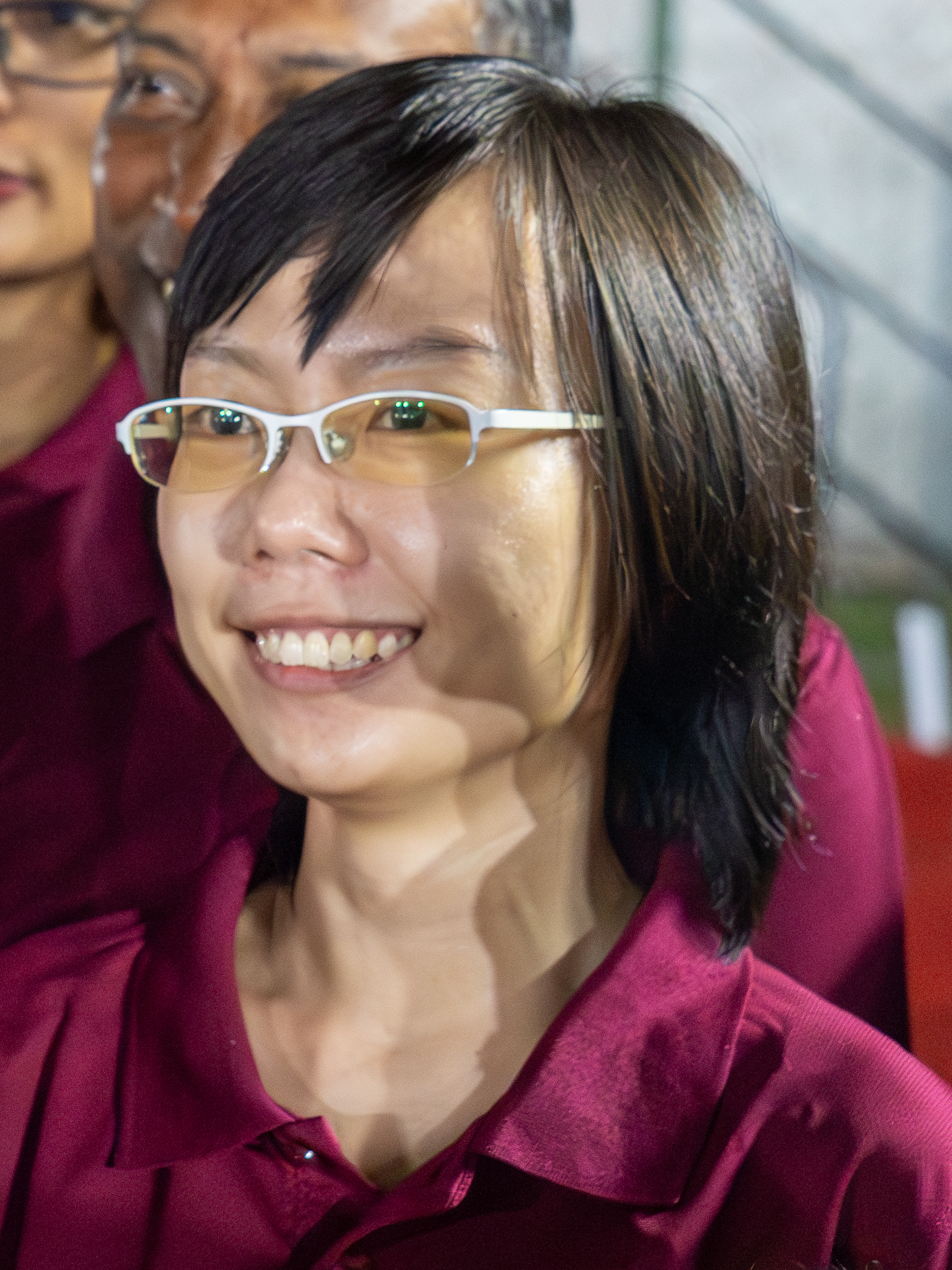
- Han in 2025

Personal details
- Born: 24 July 1992 (age 34) Malaysia
- Citizenship: Singaporean (2010–present)
- Party: People's Alliance for Reform (2025–present)
- Children: 3
- Occupation: Politician; blogger; activist

Han Hui Hui (Chinese: 韩慧慧; pinyin: Hán Huì Huì; born 24 July 1992) is a Singaporean activist and politician. She was formerly a fellow at the Centre for Applied Human Rights of the University of York.

== Early life ==
Han grew up in Singapore.

== Political career ==
=== Early political activism (2013–2015) ===
Han began her protests at Hong Lim Park in 2013. On 27 September 2014, Han was arrested along with other activists, including Roy Ngerng, for causing public nuisance and disrupting a charity carnival. She was later convicted and fined $3,100 on 27 June 2016.

=== First election campaign (2015) ===
In the 2015 general election, Han contested in Radin Mas Single Member Constituency (SMC) as an independent candidate, in a three-cornered contest against Kumar Appavoo of the Reform Party and Sam Tan of the People's Action Party (PAP). Han's campaign slogan was "Return our CPF" (Central Provident Fund), and she campaigned largely on CPF and housing issues.

Throughout the campaign, Han was accused by Reform Party secretary-general Kenneth Jeyaretnam of being sponsored by the defunct Socialist Front. Han would refute the accusations, instead criticising Jeyaretnam for losing his deposit in the 2013 Punggol East by-election. Jeyaretnam would also say that Han was not fielded as a candidate for the Reform Party due to her "creative approach to truth".

Han received 10.03% of the vote on election night, compared with Appavoo's 12.72% and Tan's 77.25%. As such, she lost her $14,500 election deposit.

=== Political activism (2015-2025) ===
In 2018, she was removed from a select committee hearing after creating a disturbance. She had been raising a stack of papers, and was removed after refusing ushers who told her to stop. In 2022, she filed a lawsuit against the government, alleging that several COVID-19 vaccination measures were "unlawful" and "irrational". The lawsuit was later dismissed.

=== Second election campaign (2025) ===
In the 2025 general election, Han was unveiled as a People's Alliance for Reform (PAR) candidate on Nomination Day, contesting in Tanjong Pagar Group Representation Constituency (GRC). In her speech that day, she criticised hecklers and blamed the PAP for problems that she stated were present in Singapore.

Throughout the campaign, Han adopted the "3H" slogan, which stood for housing, healthcare and human rights, as the central focus of her platform. Her team suffered a heavy defeat on election night, securing only 18.98% of the vote in Tanjong Pagar GRC to the PAP's 81.02%, marking the PAP's largest victory margin in a GRC in Singapore's history.

== Personal life ==
She is married and has three children. In February 2026, her children were moved to a hospital for their safety after a domestic altercation. They were returned in March 2026.
