= Pingat Bakti Masyarakat =

Award in Singapore

Pingat Bakti Masyarakat (Public Service Medal)
- Ribbon
- Type: Medal
- Awarded for: Commendable service or achievement in Singapore
- Presented by: Singapore
- Eligibility: All persons
- Status: Active
- Established: 1973
- Ribbon prior to 1996

Precedence
- Next (higher): Pingat Kepujian
- Next (lower): Pingat Berkebolehan

The Pingat Bakti Masyarakat (English: Public Service Medal) is a Singaporean national honour. It was instituted in 1973. The medal may be awarded to any person who has rendered commendable public service in Singapore or for their achievement in the field of arts and letters, sports, the sciences, business, the professions and the labour movement.

Recipients are entitled to use the post-nominal letters PBM.

== Description ==
- The medal, in silver, is in the form of a stylised rosette of undulating folds having, on the obverse side, a disc with a bar to each side upon which a circular shield bearing a crescent and 5 stars is embossed. Below it is a scroll with the inscription "PINGAT BAKTI MASYARAKAT" and 2 laurels.
- The reverse bears the State Arms.
- The ribbon is grey with a white centre band and a red stripe on each side.

== See also ==
- Category:Recipients of the Pingat Bakti Masyarakat
