= Indranee Rajah =

Singaporean politician (born 1963)

The Honourable Indranee Rajah SC
- இந்திராணி ராஜா
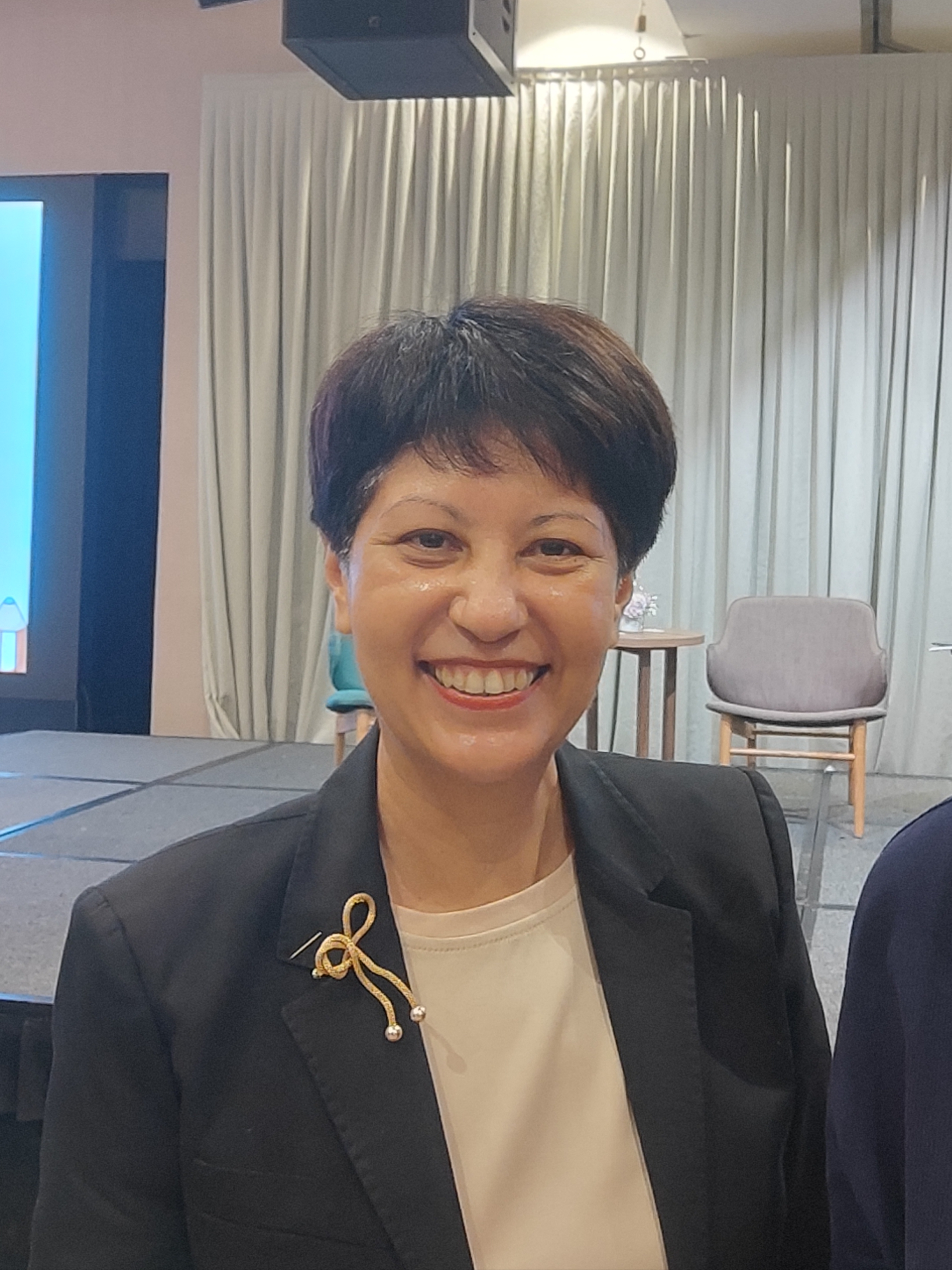
- Indranee in 2025

Leader of the House
- Incumbent
- Assumed office 24 August 2020
- Prime Minister: Lee Hsien Loong; Lawrence Wong
- Deputy: Zaqy Mohamad
- Preceded by: Grace Fu

Minister in the Prime Minister's Office
- Incumbent
- Assumed office 1 May 2018 Serving with Ng Chee Meng (2018–2020; 2026-); Tan See Leng (2020–2021); Maliki Osman (2020–2025)
- Prime Minister: Lee Hsien Loong; Lawrence Wong
- Preceded by: Chan Chun Sing (2015–2018); Josephine Teo (2017–2018)

Second Minister for National Development
- Incumbent
- Assumed office 27 July 2020
- Prime Minister: Lee Hsien Loong; Lawrence Wong
- Minister: Desmond Lee (2020-2025); Chee Hong Tat (2025–present)
- Preceded by: Desmond Lee

Second Minister for Finance
- Incumbent
- Assumed office 1 May 2018 Serving with Lawrence Wong (until 2021); Chee Hong Tat (2024–2025); Jeffrey Siow (2026-)
- Prime Minister: Lee Hsien Loong; Lawrence Wong
- Minister: Heng Swee Keat (2018–2021); Lawrence Wong (2021–present)

Second Minister for Education
- In office 1 May 2018 – 26 July 2020
- Prime Minister: Lee Hsien Loong
- Minister: Ong Ye Kung
- Preceded by: Ng Eng Hen (2005)
- Succeeded by: Maliki Osman

Second Minister for Law
- In office 1 May 2018 – 30 June 2018
- Prime Minister: Lee Hsien Loong
- Minister: K. Shanmugam
- Preceded by: S. Jayakumar (1988)
- Succeeded by: Edwin Tong (2020)

Deputy Speaker of the Parliament of Singapore
- In office 8 November 2006 – 18 April 2011 Serving with Matthias Yao
- Speaker: Abdullah Tarmugi
- Preceded by: S. Iswaran
- Succeeded by: Seah Kian Peng

Member of Parliament for Pasir Ris–Changi GRC
- Incumbent
- Assumed office 4 May 2025
- Preceded by: Constituency established
- Majority: 31,955 (35.36%)

Member of Parliament for Tanjong Pagar GRC
- In office 4 November 2001 – 15 April 2025
- Preceded by: PAP held
- Succeeded by: PAP held
- Majority: 2001: N/A (walkover); 2006: N/A (walkover); 2011: N/A (walkover); 2015: 64,637 (55.42%); 2020: 32,470 (26.26%)

Personal details
- Born: Indranee Thurai Rajah; 12 April 1963 (age 63) State of Singapore
- Party: People's Action Party
- Parents: A. T. Rajah (father); Mavis Thurairajah (mother)
- Relatives: Kumarie Rajah (sister); Ananda Rajah (brother)
- Education: National University of Singapore (LLB)
- Occupation: politician

Indranee Thurai Rajah (Note: Tamil: இந்திராணி துரை ராஜா, romanized: Intirāṇi Turai Rājā) (born 12 April 1963) is a Singaporean politician and lawyer who has been serving as Minister in the Prime Minister's Office and Second Minister for Finance since 2018, and Second Minister for National Development and Leader of the House since 2020. A member of the governing People's Action Party (PAP), she was the Member of Parliament (MP) representing the Tanjong Pagar Group Representation Constituency (GRC) between 2001 and 2025 and the MP representing Pasir Ris–Changi GRC since 2025.

Prior to entering politics, Indranee was a lawyer at Freshfields Bruckhaus Deringer and Drew & Napier. She was appointed Senior Counsel in January 2003. Indranee made her political debut in the 2001 general election as part of a six-member PAP team contesting in Tanjong Pagar GRC and won. She was subsequently elected as the Member of Parliament (MP) representing the Tanglin–Cairnhill ward of Tanjong Pagar GRC. After the death of Minister Mentor Lee Kuan Yew on 23 March 2015, Indranee also served as the grassroots advisor for the Tiong Bahru ward until the general election that September as no by-elections were called due to it being a GRC.

== Early life and education ==
Born in the State of Singapore on 12 April 1963, as a Chindian, her father A. T. Rajah, a Tamil Hindu, was the Deputy Commissioner of Police and the President of the Singapore National Olympic Council. Her mother Mavis Thurairajah, who was a Chinese formerly named Ng Yew Keng, was Anglican. Indranee had an older sister Kumarie and an older brother Ananda and they were raised in her mother's faith.

Indranee attended Marymount Convent Primary School, Marymount Convent Secondary School and Raffles Institution before graduating from the National University of Singapore with a Bachelor of Laws with honours degree in 1986.

== Career ==
=== Legal career ===
Indranee began her legal career in 1987 with Freshfields Bruckhaus Deringer. She joined Drew & Napier in 1988 and became a director of the firm in 1991. She was a litigator and had an active court practice as an advocate and solicitor, specialising in cross-border dispute resolution. She was appointed Senior Counsel by Chief Justice Yong Pung How in January 2003.

Indranee eventually became the deputy head of the firm's dispute resolution department. She left Drew & Napier in 2012.

=== Political career ===
Indranee served as Deputy Speaker of Parliament between 2006 and 2011.

On 31 July 2012, Indranee was designated as Senior Minister of State for Law and Senior Minister of State for Education before being appointed on 1 November 2012.

Indranee led a 12-member committee in 2013 to provide a strategic direction for the planned third law school in Singapore, including its admissions criteria, curriculum development and educational philosophy. On 16 February 2016, the committee which includes the Ministry of Law and Singapore University of Social Sciences, held a joint press conference to announce the opening of the SUSS School of Law.

Indranee relinquished her position as Senior Minister of State for Education, before being appointed as Senior Minister of State for Finance on 1 October 2015.

On 9 March 2018, Indranee criticised Workers' Party Member of Parliament Sylvia Lim on Facebook after the latter voiced her suspicion on the government's intention to raise the GST in order to extract an apology. The public criticised Indranee and other PAP members for hounding Lim and being narrow-minded, and supported Lim for asking a legitimate question on behalf of her constituents.

On 1 May 2018, Indranee was appointed as Minister in the Prime Minister’s Office, Second Minister for Finance and Second Minister for Education. She was succeeded by Edwin Tong as Second Minister for Law on 30 June 2018.

On 20 August 2020, Indranee was appointed as Leader of the House for the 14th Parliament.

On 21 April 2025, PAP announced Indranee will leave Tanjong Pagar GRC to lead a team comprising Sharael Taha, Desmond Tan and Valerie Lee in Pasir Ris–Changi GRC.

== Personal life ==
Indranee's father died when she was only 6 years old, following which, she and her siblings were single-handedly raised by her mother.

Her older sister Kumarie, who was a translator based in France, died of breast cancer in 1996 at age 42, while her older brother Ananda, who was a sociology lecturer at the National University of Singapore, died of a heart attack in 2007 at age 54.

In August 2025, her mother died at the age of 102.

Indranee is currently single.

== Notes ==
Political offices
| Preceded by Chan Chun Sing; Josephine Teo | Minister in the Prime Minister’s Office; 2018 – present Served alongside: Ng Chee Meng (until 2020); Maliki Osman, Tan See Leng (since 2020) | Incumbent |
Parliament of Singapore
| Preceded by | Member of Parliament for Tanjong Pagar GRC; 2001–2025 | Succeeded by Chan Chun Sing; Joan Pereira; Alvin Tan; Foo Cexiang; Rachel Ong |
| Preceded by | Member of Parliament for Pasir Ris–Changi GRC; 2025–present | Incumbent |
| Preceded by Grace Fu | Leader of the House; 2020–present | Incumbent |
