= Ministry of Defence (Singapore) =

Singapore government ministry

Agency overview
- Formed: 11 August 1970; 56 years ago
- Preceding agency: Ministry of Interior and Defence
- Jurisdiction: Government of Singapore
- Headquarters: 303 Gombak Drive, MINDEF Building, Singapore (669645)
- Motto: Safeguarding Singapore's Peace
- Employees: 282 (2024)
- Annual budget: S$23.4 billion (USD18.3b 2025)
- Ministers responsible: Chan Chun Sing, Minister for Defence; Zaqy Mohamad, Senior Minister of State; Desmond Choo, Minister of State
- Agency executives: Joseph Leong, Permanent Secretary (Defence); Ng Chad-Son, Permanent Secretary (Defence Development); BG Yew Chee Leung, Deputy Secretary (Technology)/Future Systems and Technology Architect; Eugene Leong, Deputy Secretary (Administration); Tan Peng Yam, Chief Defence Scientist; BG Frederick Choo, Deputy Secretary (Policy)
- Child agency: Defence Science and Technology Agency
- Website: www.mindef.gov.sg
- Agency ID: T08GA0011B

The Ministry of Defence (MINDEF; Malay: Kementerian Pertahanan; Chinese: 新加坡國防部; Tamil: தற்காப்பு அமைச்சு) is a ministry under the Government of Singapore responsible for overseeing the national defence of Singapore.

== History ==
MINDEF, together with the Ministry of Home Affairs, was created on 11 August 1970 by splitting up the then Ministry of Interior and Defence.

== Responsibilities ==
MINDEF's mission is to "enhance Singapore's peace and security through deterrence and diplomacy, and should these fail, to secure a swift and decisive victory over the aggressor."

It has a policy of Total Defence which consists of Military Defence, Civil Defence, Economic Defence, Social Defence, Psychological Defence and Digital Defence involving the people, public and private sectors of the country.

== Organisational structure ==
MINDEF has one statutory board, the Defence Science and Technology Agency (DSTA).

The Singapore Armed Forces (SAF), which consists of the Singapore Army, the Republic of Singapore Navy (RSN), the Republic of Singapore Air Force (RSAF), and the Digital and Intelligence Service (DIS),are the military components of MINDEF.

The Security and Intelligence Division (SID), the foreign intelligence service of Singapore, operates autonomously within the ministry.

== Ministers ==
The Ministry is headed by the Minister for Defence (Minister for Interior and Defence from 1965 to 1970), who is appointed as part of the Cabinet of Singapore. The incumbent Minister is Chan Chun Sing, an MP for Tanjong Pagar GRC from the governing People's Action Party.

Minister	Took office	Left office	Party	Cabinet
Goh Keng Swee; MP for Kreta Ayer (1918–2010)	9 August 1965	16 August 1967	PAP	Lee K. II
Lim Kim San; MP for Cairnhill (1916–2006)	17 August 1967	10 August 1970	PAP	Lee K. II
Lim Kim San; MP for Cairnhill (1916–2006)	17 August 1967	10 August 1970	PAP	Lee K. III
Goh Keng Swee; MP for Kreta Ayer (1918–2010)	11 August 1970	11 February 1979	PAP	Lee K. III
Goh Keng Swee; MP for Kreta Ayer (1918–2010)	11 August 1970	11 February 1979	PAP	Lee K. IV
Goh Keng Swee; MP for Kreta Ayer (1918–2010)	11 August 1970	11 February 1979	PAP	Lee K. V
Howe Yoon Chong; MP for Potong Pasir (1923–2007)	12 February 1979	31 May 1982	PAP	Lee K. V
Howe Yoon Chong; MP for Potong Pasir (1923–2007)	12 February 1979	31 May 1982	PAP	Lee K. VI
Goh Chok Tong; MP for Marine Parade (until 1988) and Marine Parade GRC (from 1988) (born 1941)	1 June 1982	30 June 1991	PAP	Lee K. VI
Goh Chok Tong; MP for Marine Parade (until 1988) and Marine Parade GRC (from 1988) (born 1941)	1 June 1982	30 June 1991	PAP	Lee K. VII
Goh Chok Tong; MP for Marine Parade (until 1988) and Marine Parade GRC (from 1988) (born 1941)	1 June 1982	30 June 1991	PAP	Lee K. VIII
Goh Chok Tong; MP for Marine Parade (until 1988) and Marine Parade GRC (from 1988) (born 1941)	1 June 1982	30 June 1991	PAP	Goh I
Yeo Ning Hong; MP for Kampong Glam GRC (born 1943)	1 July 1991	1 July 1994	PAP	Goh I
Yeo Ning Hong; MP for Kampong Glam GRC (born 1943)	1 July 1991	1 July 1994	PAP	Goh II
Lee Boon Yang; MP for Jalan Besar GRC (born 1947)	2 July 1994	1 August 1995	PAP	Goh II
Tony Tan; MP for Sembawang GRC (born 1940)	2 August 1995	31 July 2003	PAP	Goh II
Tony Tan; MP for Sembawang GRC (born 1940)	2 August 1995	31 July 2003	PAP	Goh III
Tony Tan; MP for Sembawang GRC (born 1940)	2 August 1995	31 July 2003	PAP	Goh IV
Teo Chee Hean; MP for Pasir Ris–Punggol GRC (born 1954)	1 August 2003	20 May 2011	PAP	Goh IV
Teo Chee Hean; MP for Pasir Ris–Punggol GRC (born 1954)	1 August 2003	20 May 2011	PAP	Lee H. I
Teo Chee Hean; MP for Pasir Ris–Punggol GRC (born 1954)	1 August 2003	20 May 2011	PAP	Lee H. II
Ng Eng Hen; MP for Bishan–Toa Payoh GRC (born 1958)	21 May 2011	22 May 2025	PAP	Lee H. III
Ng Eng Hen; MP for Bishan–Toa Payoh GRC (born 1958)	21 May 2011	22 May 2025	PAP	Lee H. IV
Ng Eng Hen; MP for Bishan–Toa Payoh GRC (born 1958)	21 May 2011	22 May 2025	PAP	Lee H. V
Ng Eng Hen; MP for Bishan–Toa Payoh GRC (born 1958)	21 May 2011	22 May 2025	PAP	Wong I
Chan Chun Sing; MP for Tanjong Pagar GRC (born 1969)	23 May 2025	Incumbent	PAP	Wong II

== See also ==
- Ministry of Home Affairs
