= Chia Shi-Lu =

Singaporean politician

- 谢世儒

Member of the Singapore Parliament for Tanjong Pagar GRC (Queenstown)
- In office 27 April 2011 – 23 June 2020
- Preceded by: Baey Yam Keng (PAP)
- Succeeded by: Eric Chua (PAP)

Personal details
- Born: 13 October 1971 (age 54) Singapore
- Party: People's Action Party
- Education: Anglo-Chinese School (Independent); National Junior College; National University of Singapore; Imperial College London; University of London

Chia Shi-Lu (Chinese: 谢世儒; pinyin: Xiè Shìrú; born 13 October 1971) is a Singaporean medical practitioner and former politician. A member of the country's governing People's Action Party, he served as Member of Parliament of Tanjong Pagar Group Representation Constituency (GRC) for Queenstown from 7 May 2011 to 23 June 2020.

== Early life ==
Chia was born on 13 October 1971 to a middle-class family and is the older of two brothers. He studied in Anglo-Chinese School (Independent) and National Junior College. In 1990, Chia received the President's Scholarship to study medicine at the National University of Singapore; he graduated in 1995.

== Career ==
After graduating, Chia worked overseas in Switzerland, Japan, London and Boston. He joined the Singapore General Hospital in 2001 and received his qualifications in surgery and orthopedics in 2000 and 2003 respectively. He is also an associate professor at Duke-NUS.

=== Political career ===
Chia joined the People's Action Party in 2009. In the 2011 Singaporean general election, Chia was fielded as a replacement candidate for Baey Yam Keng in the PAP team contesting Tanjong Pagar GRC; Baey had to replace Steve Tan who dropped out of the election for personal reasons. The team won by walkover. In the 2015 election, the team successfully defended their constituency against Singaporeans First.

In 2014, Chia succeeded Lam Pin Min as Chairman of the Government Parliamentary Committee for Health.

On 12 April 2020, Chia made a Facebook post detailing his trip to Alexandra Village Hawker Centre to distribute masks amidst the ongoing COVID-19 pandemic in Singapore. He was criticised for apparently violating the circuit breaker (stay-at-home order) to campaign. Chia defended himself, stating that he was there to educate the public to wear masks. The PAP announced that it was suspending all ground engagement activities the next day.

Chia did not contest in the 2020 general election, and hence stepped down as MP.

Parliament of Singapore
| Preceded by Baey Yam Keng | Member of Parliament for Tanjong Pagar GRC (Queenstown); 2011 – 2020 | Succeeded by Eric Chua |
