= Ker Sin Tze =

Singaporean politician

- 柯新治
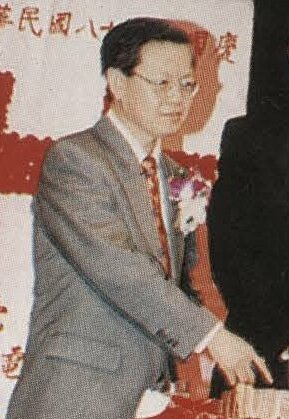
- Ker in 1997

Member of the Singapore Parliament for Aljunied GRC
- In office 21 August 1991 – 18 October 2001
- Preceded by: Wan Hussin Zoohri
- Succeeded by: Cynthia Phua

Personal details
- Born: Ker Sin Tze; 24 December 1944 (age 81) Singapore, Straits Settlements
- Party: People's Action Party
- Spouse: Lee Geok Peng
- Children: 2 sons
- Education: Nanyang University (BComm.); University of Manitoba (MSc, PhD)
- Occupation: Politician, professor

Ker Sin Tze (Note: Chinese: 柯新治; pinyin: Kē Xīnzhì) (born 24 December 1944) is a former Singaporean politician. A former member of the People's Action Party (PAP), Ker was a Member of Parliament for Aljunied Group Representation Constituency between 1991 and 2001.

== Education ==
In his early years, Ker was educated at Xing Hua Primary School. He graduated with a Bachelor of Commerce from the then Nanyang University, Singapore in 1966. In 1968, Ker obtained his master's degree in economics from the University of Manitoba, Canada. He obtained his PhD in economics from the University of Manitoba, Canada in 1972.

== Career ==
From On 1 March 2001, he was elected as an independent director to the Board of Tung Lok Group.

From 1994 to 2001, he was managing director of Yenom Holdings Pte Ltd.

As of January 1992, Ker was managing director of Liang Court and from 1994 to 2001, Ker was managing director of Yenom Holdings Pte Ltd. Both Liang Court and Yenom Holdings belonged to billionaire Goh Cheng Liang. He was chairman of Superior Metal Printing Limited (1990–1992, September 1994–1995); deputy chairman of the Chinese Development Assistance Council (Sep 1994–2000).

In October 2001, Ker was appointed managing director at Dragon Land, a company dealing with China property market. Ker was the chairman and director of construction firm IRE Corp until 1 November 2001.

=== Political career ===
Ker entered politics through a walkover in Aljunied GRC in the 1991 General Election. In the 1997 General Election, the PAP team faced opponents from the SDP and won 67.02% of the votes. He was Minister of State (Sep-Dec 1991) and later Minister of State for Education (Jan 1992) and Information and the Arts (Jan 1992-Aug 1994). Ker was the chairman of the Aljunied Town Council (Feb 1995) and the Government Parliamentary Committees for Home Affairs and Law (Aug 1995–1996). He stepped down from politics at the 2001 General Election.

=== Diplomatic career ===
From October 2002 to June 2007, he was appointed Trade Representative in the Singapore Trade Office in Taipei. From July to December 2007, Ker was the special adviser to Minister for Foreign Affairs George Yeo, who was his Aljunied GRC teammate. Ker was the Consul-General in Hong Kong and Macao between 2008 and 2012.

=== Academic career ===
Ker was an adjunct professor at the Nanyang Technological University since 2001 and also serves as an adjunct professor at Lee Kuan Yew School of Public Policy, National University of Singapore, and at the Public Policy and Global Affairs programme of Nanyang Technological University.

== Notes ==
Parliament of Singapore
Preceded by Chin Harn Tong; George Yeo; Wan Hussin B H Zoohri	Member of Parliament for Aljunied GRC; 1991 – 2001	Succeeded by Ong Seh Hong; Yeo Guat Kwang; Zainul Abidin; George Yeo; Cynthia Phua
