= Fadli Fawzi =

Singaporean politician and lawyer (born 17 March 1985)

The Honourable Fadli Fawzi
- فضلي فوزي

Member of the Singapore Parliament for Aljunied GRC
- Incumbent
- Assumed office 3 May 2025
- Preceded by: WP held
- Majority: 25,783 (19.42%)

Deputy Organsing Secretary of the Workers' Party
- Incumbent
- Assumed office 7 July 2026 Serving with Tan Kong Soon

Personal details
- Born: Muhammad Fadli bin Mohammed Fawzi; 17 March 1985 (age 41) Singapore
- Party: Workers' Party
- Children: 1
- Education: National University of Singapore; Singapore Management University
- Occupation: Politician; lawyer; sociologist

Muhammad Fadli bin Mohammed Fawzi (Note: Jawi: محمد فضلي بن محمد فوزي) (born 17 March 1985) is a Singaporean politician, lawyer, and sociologist. A member of the Workers' Party (WP), Fadli has been the Member of Parliament (MP) for the Kaki Bukit division of Aljunied Group Representation Constituency (GRC) since 2025.

== Early life and education ==
Fadli was born in Singapore on 17 March 1985 to a middle-class Malay family. His father worked as a civil servant and his mother was a teacher.

He attended Jaya Primary School, Victoria School, and Nanyang Junior College before earning a Bachelor of Social Science (Honours) in 2005 and a Master of Social Science in 2008, both in Sociology.

Fadli later obtained a Juris Doctor degree (cum laude) from the Singapore Management University in 2016 and was admitted to the Singapore Bar in 2017.

== Career ==
=== Policy work ===
Fadli worked as a policy development officer in the Majlis Ugama Islam Singapura (MUIS) from 2008 to 2013.

=== Legal practice ===
Fadli was called to the bar in 2017. He has been practicing in Inkwell Law Corporation since 2019, specialising in litigation work.

Inkwell Law Corporation has also since been awarded the Legal Aid Bureau Outstanding Contribution (Gold) award three times, in 2022, 2023 and 2025.

=== Political career ===
Fadli joined the WP in 2013 and volunteered in Aljunied GRC. He was later elected to the Workers' Party's Central Executive Committee (CEC) in 2018 and currently serves as its Deputy Organising Secretary.

During the 2020 general election, Fadli contested in the five-member Marine Parade GRC; he drew attention for his bilingual pantun and his political commentary on the 'reframing of Malay politics'. The WP team lost to the governing People's Action Party (PAP) with 42.26% of the vote.

During the 2025 general election, Fadli replaced Faisal Manap who chose to contest in Tampines GRC, a decision Singh later described as fulfilling a long-standing wish for Faisal, to contest in Aljunied GRC with Pritam Singh, Sylvia Lim, Gerald Giam and Kenneth Tiong. The team won the GRC with 59.71% of the votes. Fadli was elected as Member of Parliament representing Aljunied GRC in the 15th Parliament.

== Personal life ==
Fadli is married with one child.
