= Kenneth Tiong =

Singaporean politician (born 1989)

The Honourable Kenneth Tiong
- 张文杰

Member of Parliament for Aljunied GRC
- Incumbent
- Assumed office 3 May 2025
- Preceded by: WP held
- Majority: 25,783 (19.42%)

Treasurer of the Workers' Party
- Incumbent
- Assumed office 7 July 2026
- Preceded by: He Ting Ru

Personal details
- Born: Kenneth Tiong Boon Kiat; 1989 (age 36–37)
- Party: Workers' Party
- Children: 2
- Education: Brown University
- Occupation: Politician; businessman

Kenneth Tiong Boon Kiat (Note: Chinese: 张文杰; Pe̍h-ōe-jī: Tiong Bûn-kia̍t; pinyin: Zhāng Wénjié) (born 1989) is a Singaporean politician and businessman. A member of the Workers' Party (WP), Tiong has been the Member of Parliament (MP) for the Serangoon division of Aljunied Group Representation Constituency (GRC) since 2025. He has served as the party's treasurer since 2026.

== Education ==
Tiong attended Raffles Institution and Raffles Junior College. In 2014, he graduated from Brown University with a Bachelor of Science in Applied Mathematics-Computer Science and Philosophy.

== Career ==
Tiong worked at McKinsey & Company from 2014 to 2016 as a business analyst, and at Millennium Management from 2016 to 2018 as a quantitative analyst. He later became head quant developer and portfolio manager at Brahman Capital and worked there until 2022.

In 2022, Tiong co-founded a technology startup and served as its chief technology officer until 2023. Since 2023, he has been the director of Sensemake.ai, a news intelligence platform.

=== Political career ===
Tiong first volunteered with the WP in 2023, contributing to its policy team and assisting party activities in East Coast GRC and Aljunied GRC. He joined the party in late 2023. In May 2024, he became the legislative assistant of Leader of the Opposition Pritam Singh, and, in January 2025, the party's coordinator for activities in the Serangoon division of Aljunied GRC. In April 2025, he was spotted at an Aljunied GRC event, causing speculation that he would run in the 2025 general election. On Nomination Day, 23 April, Tiong was officially announced as a WP candidate for Aljunied GRC.

During the 2025 general election, Tiong was in a five-member WP team and contested in Aljunied GRC with Pritam Singh, Sylvia Lim, Gerald Giam and Fadli Fawzi and won the GRC with 59.71% of the votes. Tiong was elected as Member of Parliament representing Aljunied GRC in the 15th Parliament.

==== Central Executive Committee ====
In June 2025, Tiong was co-opted to the WP's Central Executive Committee (CEC) as the party's deputy treasurer. At the party's cadre members' conference on 28 June 2026, he was elected to the CEC for the 2026–2028 term. At the committee's first meeting on 7 July 2026, he was appointed treasurer, succeeding He Ting Ru.

==== Aljunied—Hougang Town Council ====
He is a vice-chairperson of the Aljunied–Hougang Town Council.

==== Parliamentary record ====
===== Maiden speech =====
Tiong delivered his maiden speech during the debate on the President's Address in September 2025, arguing that Singapore should build "inherent capacity" – an indigenous industrial base – through "positive integration" with regional partners modelled on the Airbus consortium, rather than rely on foreign direct investment or trade-barrier removal alone.

===== Space agency =====
On 22 September 2025, during clarifications to Deputy Prime Minister Gan Kim Yong's speech on industry transformation, Tiong asked whether the government intended to establish a national space agency. Gan replied that Singapore already had the Office for Space Technology and Industry (OSTIn) and was exploring further opportunities in space technology. On 2 February 2026, Minister-in-charge of Energy and Science & Technology Tan See Leng announced at the inaugural Space Summit that the government would establish the National Space Agency of Singapore (NSAS) on 1 April 2026 as a department under the Ministry of Trade and Industry, with OSTIn to be folded into the new agency.

===== Gold trading hub =====
On 12 February 2026, Tiong moved an adjournment motion proposing that Singapore develop as a regional gold trading hub, outlining proposals for sovereign custody guarantees, expanded refining capacity, a bullion standard, and gold derivatives infrastructure. In his parliamentary reply, MAS Deputy Chairman Chee Hong Tat said the government's objectives "do not differ" and that it would consider the proposals. On 27 March 2026, MAS and the Singapore Bullion Market Association announced plans to develop Singapore as a gold trading centre, including vaulting services for foreign central banks.

===== National service =====
Tiong has raised national service in Parliament several times. In February 2026, he called for second-year full-time national servicemen to be paid at least the $1,800 Local Qualifying Salary; Minister for Defence Chan Chun Sing replied that duty should not be conflated with transaction. In September, he asked why national service was not protected under the Workplace Fairness Act; the Government said three related complaints had been made in 2024 and 2025. In November, he asked how many national servicemen had died in service each year; the Government said an average of 10 to 11 had died each year from 2016 to 2025, with suicide the leading cause.

===== Dialect films =====
In June 2026, the Infocomm Media Development Authority decided that Dear You, a Chinese film shot almost entirely in Teochew, would go on general release in Singapore in a Mandarin-dubbed version, with the Teochew original limited to a small number of screenings. Tiong filed a parliamentary question asking whether the guideline that Chinese films on general release be in Mandarin would be abolished, arguing that dialect use at home had fallen below 12 per cent and that dialect films should be shown with subtitles rather than dubbed. In Parliament on 7 July, when Tiong asked whether ministers had watched either version, Acting Minister for Culture, Community and Youth David Neo replied that "ministers have no time to watch movies"; Senior Minister of State Tan Kiat How said the guidelines on dialect in films were being reviewed. At the National Day Rally on 23 August, Prime Minister Lawrence Wong announced that dialect films would no longer have a cap on screenings, so long as a Mandarin-dubbed version was also available.

===== Regional integration =====
On 7 July 2026, Tiong moved an adjournment motion on integration with the region, arguing that Singaporeans and Singaporean firms should "own a real piece of the value chains" in Southeast Asia rather than rely on Singapore's role as a hub, "because a hub, unlike an owner, can be bypassed". Saying that "neither side has a complete, owned front-end alone" in semiconductors, he proposed a joint chain in which the region's chip designers would prototype on Singapore's wafer fabs and packaging lines, tied to stakes for Singaporean investors. He also proposed a Malaysia–Singapore business entity, recognised in law by both countries, with a minimum stake held on each side and closer-to-local treatment in grants, financing and procurement. Minister of State for Trade and Industry Alvin Tan replied that integration with Malaysia had to be "additive and not substitutive", and said of the proposed deals with Malaysia that "it is within their jurisdiction".

===== Economy motion =====
On 5 August 2026, Tiong moved a Workers' Party motion, "An Economy of the Future that Works for All", seconded by Jamus Lim. As filed, it stated that the House, "notwithstanding" the suggestions in the Economic Strategy Review, believed in "a more equal and inclusive economy". Tiong argued for "an economy where a fair distribution is produced by the growth itself, rather than repaired afterwards out of the proceeds", and proposed a university-centred zone around Nanyang Technological University in which state land would be priced at development cost rather than scarcity value, with housing affordable on a starting salary. After more than eight hours of debate, the House adopted four amendments proposed by People's Action Party MP Edward Chia, the first replacing "notwithstanding" with "in line with". The Workers' Party rejected the first amendment and its 12 MPs recorded their dissent as the amended motion passed.

== Personal life ==
Tiong is married with two children.

== Notes ==
Parliament of Singapore
Preceded by Pritam Singh; Sylvia Lim; Faisal Manap; Gerald Giam; Leon Perera	Member of Parliament for Aljunied GRC; 2025–present Served alongside: Pritam Singh, Sylvia Lim, Gerald Giam, Fadli Fawzi	Incumbent
