= Faisal Manap =

Singaporean politician

- فيصل مناف
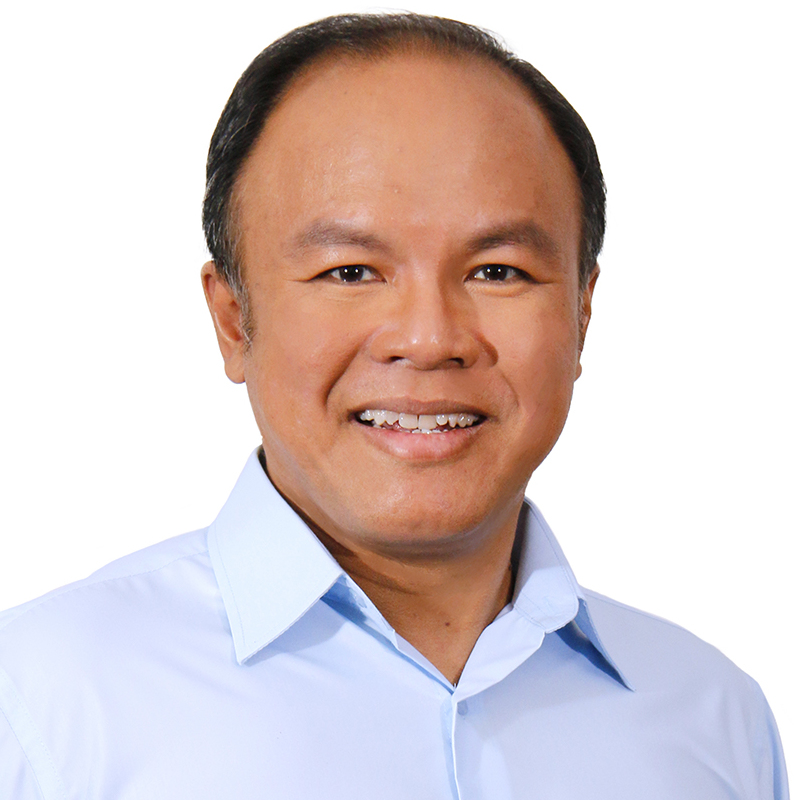
- Official portrait, 2021

Vice-chairperson of the Workers' Party
- Incumbent
- Assumed office 29 May 2016
- Chairperson: Sylvia Lim
- Secretary-general: Low Thia Khiang; Pritam Singh

Member of Parliament for Aljunied GRC
- In office 7 May 2011 – 15 April 2025
- Preceded by: PAP held
- Succeeded by: WP held
- Majority: 2011: 12,460 (9.44%); 2015: 2,626 (1.92%); 2020: 28,485 (19.90%)

Personal details
- Born: 6 June 1975 (age 51) Singapore
- Party: Workers' Party
- Education: Monash University (BS)
- Occupation: Politician; Real Estate Agent

Muhamad Faisal bin Abdul Manap (Jawi: محمد فيصل بن عبد المناف; born 6 June 1975) is a Singaporean politician who has been the vice-chairperson of the Workers' Party (WP) since 2016. He was the Member of Parliament (MP) for the Kaki Bukit division of Aljunied Group Representation Constituency (GRC) between 2011 and 2025.

== Education ==
Faisal attended Eunos Primary School and Telok Kurau Secondary School before graduating from Singapore Polytechnic in 1995 with a diploma in civil and structural engineering.

He went on to complete a Bachelor of Science degree in psychology at Monash University in 2005.

== Career ==
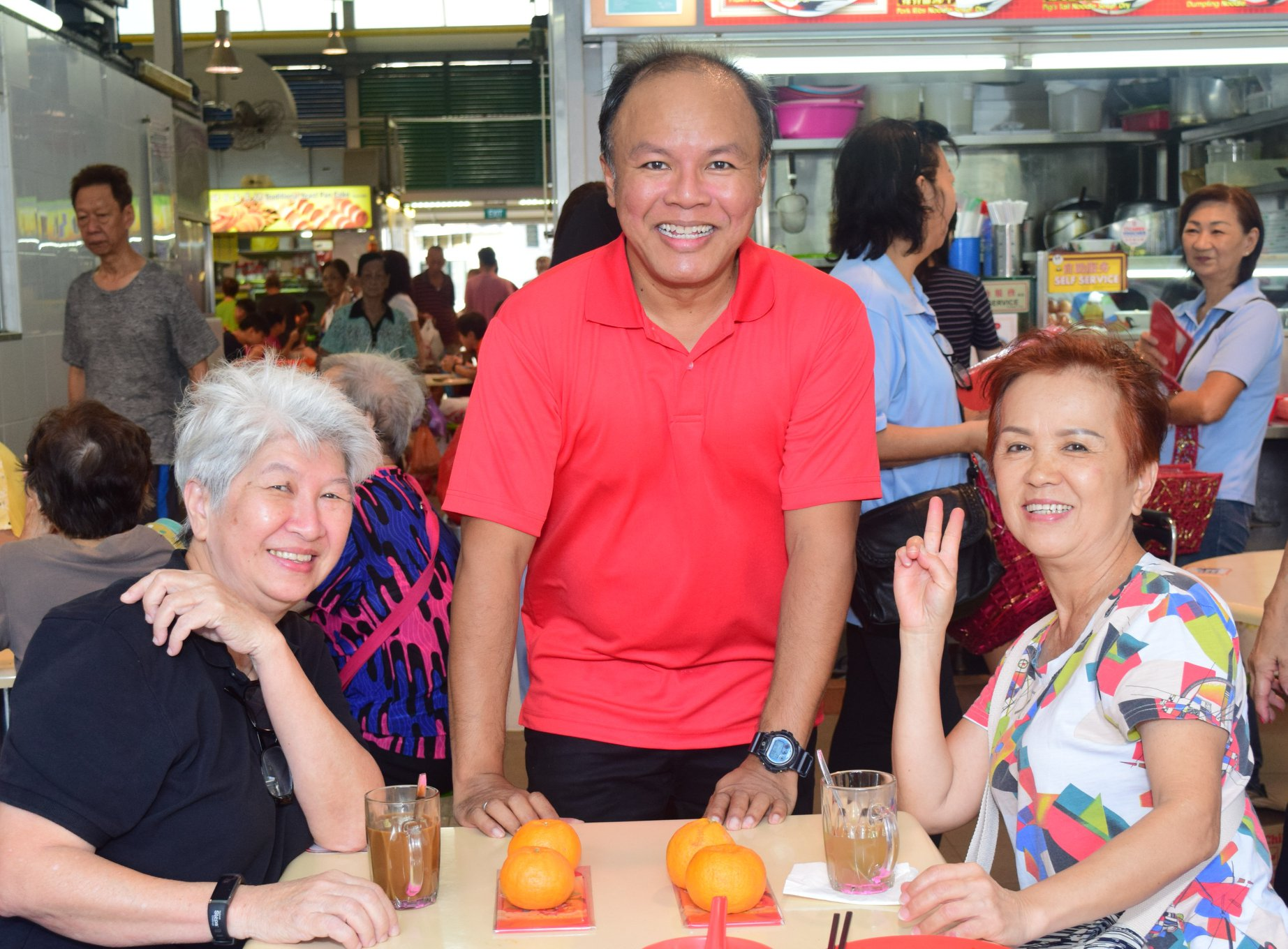
Faisal on a walkabout

Between 1998 and 2002, Faisal worked as a technical officer in the Housing and Development Board (HDB). Between 2006 and 2010, he worked as a marriage and divorce counsellor for couples. As of 9 July 2010, his occupation was listed as a freelance counsellor, having "recently" resigned from his prior social work agency.

Faisal joined the WP sometime in February 2006, and made his electoral debut in the 2011 general election as part of a five-member WP team contesting Aljunied GRC. Their team defeated the governing People's Action Party (PAP) with the 54.72% of the vote, making history as the first opposition team to capture a GRC since its creation in 1988, and Faisal become the first Malay-ethnic opposition MP-elect in post-independence Singapore. He then served as a full-time MP overseeing the Kaki Bukit division, a division being included from the neigbouring Marine Parade GRC in the recent electoral drawings.

Faisal was re-elected for two more terms in the 2015 and 2020 polls. In the 2015 polls, an election recount revealed that he and two other divisions for the GRC (the other being Low Thia Khiang's Bedok Reservoir-Punggol and Pritam Singh's Eunos divisions) narrowly won the vote by thousands of votes while the other two were lost to PAP by hundreds of votes; the resulting margin was only 1.92%, which accounted for around 2,600 votes. Faisal was elected into the Central Executive Committee (CEC) of the WP as the party's vice-chairperson on 29 May 2016, replacing Mohammed Rahizan Yaacob. He has since retained the position in subsequent CEC elections.

Within the Aljunied–Hougang Town Council (AHTC), he served as chairperson of the Estate and Liaison Committee (2013–2018), chairperson of AHTC (2018–2021), and vice-chairperson of AHTC (2021–2022). At the time until 2023, AHTC was a subject of public scrutiny where the town council had allegedly involved in mismanagement over a breach of duties where the councilors were found guilty for breaching their duties, but a successful appeal overturned the court's decision in favour to them and WP won the lawsuit.

Prior to the nomination day for the 2025 election, Faisal told on media that he had intention to lead his team in the neighbouring Tampines GRC, a ward where WP will contest there for the first time since its ward was created in 1988. (Note: Prior to the 2025 election, Tampines GRC has always been contested by the National Solidarity Party (NSP) since its creation (and in the 2001 and 2006 elections, NSP under the Singapore Democratic Alliance (SDA) banner), except in 1997 where Tampines GRC saw a walkover on nomination day following NSP's disqualification.) Faisal and his five-member team was eventually nominated in the Tampines GRC, resulting in a four-cornered contest between them, the incumbent PAP, the NSP, and the People's Power Party. Faisal and the PAP-leader Masagos Zulkifli, who's also the Social and Family Development minister and Minister-in-charge of Muslim Affairs at the time, tackled issues relating to multiracial issues and religion which was one of the central topics mentioned during the election's hustings.

Ultimately, the PAP team won with a vote of 52.02%, defeating Faisal's team who garnered 47.37%. Despite their team was offered a seat for the Non-constituency Member of Parliament because of the best-losing scores, their team chose Eileen Chong, thus Faisal did not return to Parliament. His Kaki Bukit division has since taken over by Fadli Fawzi, who his team from Aljunied GRC won that ensuing election.

=== Investigation for conduct before the Committee of Privileges ===
In November 2021, Raeesah Khan, then-MP for the Compassvale division of Sengkang GRC, resigned from the WP and Parliament after admitting that she had fabricated an account, which she later presented to Parliament as fact, of accompanying a victim of sexual assault to a police station. Her division was divided into three parts, each to be managed by one of the remaining three MPs for Sengkang GRC, while Faisal became an interim advisor to the team of three. Party leader Pritam Singh claimed that the appointment of Faisal as an advisor addressed concerns on the lack of a minority MP for the GRC. (Note: Every team in a GRC is legally required to contain at least one minority (i.e. non-Chinese) candidate, either Malay or Indian/other (other being not Chinese, Malay or Indian). The mandatory minority category in a GRC is determined by the President. The number of GRCs requiring Malay candidates at a general election must be three-fifths of the total number of GRCs, or, if that is fractional, the next highest whole number.)

In February 2022, in relation to Khan's resignation, the Committee of Privileges (COP), on account of Faisal and Singh's conduct before it, recommended that the two be referred to the Public Prosecutor for review to determine whether criminal proceedings should be brought against them.

On 19 March 2024, the Singapore Police Force and Attorney-General's Chambers announced that Faisal would not receive charges for his refusal to answer questions asked by the COP, unlike Singh, who pleaded not guilty to the two charges levied against him of lying to a parliamentary committee. However, the previous day, the police had formally issued an advisory to Faisal after consultation with the Public Prosecutor, advising him to "familiarise himself with the conduct expected of Members of Parliament" and "to refrain from any act that may be in breach of [the Parliament (Privileges, Immunities and Powers) Act 1962]".

House leader Indranee Rajah announced on a Parliament meeting on 7 July 2026 on the acquittal of both him and Sylvia Lim. Rajah cited that the case was initiated during the previous parliament term and since the case was closed after the end of the term, the Parliament could not punish them retroactively under the Constitution under the Parliament (Privileges, Immunities and Powers) Act 1962.

=== Parliamentary representation ===
==== Maintenance of Religious Harmony Act ====
During the debate over a parliamentary bill to amend the Maintenance of Religious Harmony Act, Faisal argued with K. Shanmugam, Minister for Law and Home Affairs, over the separation of religion from politics; during the argument, Faisal stated that he disagreed with the total separation of religion from politics. While saying that people "[should not] use religion for the benefit of politics", he argued that the intertwining of religion and politics in the formulation of policies was inevitable.

==== Allowing uniformed Muslim women to wear tudungs at work ====
During his parliamentary career, Faisal persistently proposed to allow Muslim nurses and women in uniformed services to don the tudung, an Islamic headscarf, while working. In 2017, he was rebuked by Masagos Zulkifli, Minister-in-charge of Muslim Affairs, for "subtly and frequently needling" the Malay–Muslim community with the proposal. Masagos said that such topics should be discussed behind closed doors instead of in Parliament, as their publicity was capable of disrupting racial and religious harmony in Singapore. In 2021, Prime Minister Lee Hsien Loong announced that Muslim nurses in Singaporean public healthcare would be allowed to wear the tudung with their uniforms.

==== Repeal of Section 377A ====
In November 2022, Parliament voted on a repeal of Section 377A of the Penal Code, a law that criminalised sex between consenting adult males. Faisal was absent due to a COVID-19 infection, but conveyed through Singh, on the first day of the parliamentary debate, that he opposed the motion as "a matter of religion and conscience".

=== Wear White campaign ===
In June 2014, Faisal was seen alongside campaign organisers and supporters for the Wear White campaign, a Muslim anti-LGBTQ movement in Singapore that specifically opposed homosexuality and Pink Dot SG. He stated that he backed the movement in his personal capacity "as a Muslim individual", saying, "it has nothing to do with the party stand."

== Personal life ==
Faisal is married and has two sons and a daughter. He enjoys fishing, bowling, and meals with his family.

On 24 July 2023, Faisal was admitted to the intensive care unit of a hospital due to a cardiac condition. The WP stated on Facebook that he was conscious, stable and being monitored in intensive care, and that the remaining MPs for Aljunied GRC would take over his constituency duties temporarily.

== Notes ==
Parliament of Singapore
Preceded by Lim Hwee Hua; Zainul Abidin; Yeo Guat Kwang; George Yeo; Cynthia Phua	Member of Parliament for Aljunied GRC; 2011 – 2025; Served alongside: (2011 – 2015; 2015 – 2020): Low Thia Khiang, Pritam Singh, Chen Show Mao, Sylvia Lim (2020 – 2025): Gerald Giam, Pritam Singh, Sylvia Lim, Leon Perera (resigned in 2023)	Succeeded by Gerald Giam; Pritam Singh; Fadli Fawzi; Sylvia Lim; Kenneth Tiong
