= Chin Harn Tong =

Singaporean politician

- 钱翰琮

Member of the Singapore Parliament for Aljunied GRC
- In office 3 September 1988 – 16 December 1996
- Preceded by: Constituency established
- Succeeded by: PAP held
- Majority: 1988: 7,645 (12.67%); 1991: N/A (walkover)

Member of the Singapore Parliament for Aljunied Constituency
- In office 2 September 1972 – 17 August 1988
- Preceded by: Mohamad Ghazali Ismail
- Succeeded by: Constituency abolished
- Majority: 1972: 8,501 (47.26%); 1976: 8,127 (49.76%); 1980: 10,888 (69.18%); 1984: N/A (walkover)

Personal details
- Born: Chin Harn Tong; 8 September 1937 (age 89) Singapore, Straits Settlements
- Party: People's Action Party
- Occupation: Politician, labour leader, teacher

Chin Harn Tong (Note: Chinese: 钱翰琮; Bǽh-oe-tu: Cî Hán-tông; pinyin: Qián Hàncóng) (born 8 September 1937; also known as Chee Han Tong) is a former Singaporean politician. A member of the People's Action Party, Chin was a Member of Parliament for Aljunied Constituency between 1972 and 1988 and of Aljunied Group Representation Constituency (GRC) between 1988 and 1996.

== Early life ==
Chin Harn Tong was born into a Hainanese family. He was a teacher at now-defunct Kiau Nam School between 1957 and 1961, and briefly taught at Chung Hwa Girls' High School in 1964. He was awarded the Public Administration Medal (Bronze) and the Friend of Labour Award by NTUC in 1971.

== Career ==
After leaving his teaching career, Chin joined the labour movement in Singapore. He was Assistant Director at NTUC Research Unit between 1970 and 1978 and subsequently Executive Director and Advisor of NTUC COMFORT from 1978 to 1986.

In 1972, Chin ran for parliament as a PAP candidate in Aljunied Constituency. He defeated candidates from the Workers' Party (WP) and the United National Front by winning 71.5% of the votes. In 1976, Chin ran for re-election in the same constituency, this time competing against Lim Kang Chew of the WP. Chin was re-elected with 74.9% of the votes won. In 1980, Chin faced United Front's Sim Peng Kim and won 84.6% of the votes. The Aljunied Constituency seat was uncontested in the 1984 General Election and Chin returned to parliament.

During the 1988 Singaporean general election, following the establishment of GRC and Single Member Constituency (SMC), Aljunied Constituency was merged into Aljunied GRC. Chin contested the three man GRC with Wan Hussin Zoohri, and George Yeo. They faced a challenge from the SDP team of Mohamed Jufrie, Christopher Neo, and Ashleigh Seow. The PAP team defeated the SDP team by winning 56.33% of the votes. In the 1991 General Election, Aljunied GRC was uncontested and Chin returned to parliament; this would be his last election before retiring. Chin chaired the Aljunied Town Council from 1989 to 1993.

Chin became Political Secretary and later Parliamentary Secretary for Home Affairs between 1977 and 1981. He rose to become Senior Parliamentary Secretary for Home Affairs between 1981 and 1988.

After his retirement from politics, Chin was appointed a Justice of the Peace in 1998.

== Notes ==
Parliament of Singapore
Preceded by Mohamad Ghazali Ismail	Member of Parliament for Aljunied Constituency; 1972 – 1988	Constituency abolished
New constituency	Member of Parliament for Aljunied GRC; 1988 – 1996; Served alongside: (1988 - 1991): George Yeo, Wan Hussin Zoohri (1991 - 1996): George Yeo, Maidin Packer, Ker Sin Tze	Succeeded by Toh See Kiat; David Lim; Sidek Saniff; George Yeo; Ker Sin Tze
