= Low Thia Khiang =

Singaporean politician (born 1956)

- 刘程强
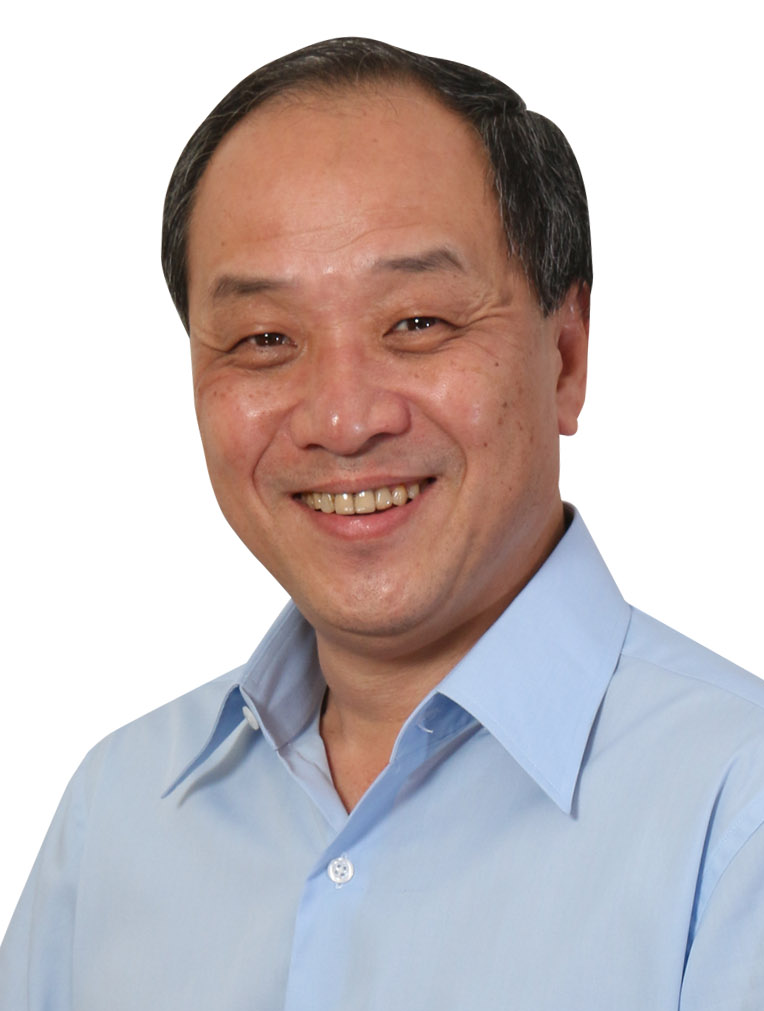
- Official portrait, 2015

8th Leader of the Opposition (Note: De facto, not an official position in parliamentary proceedings.)
- In office 2 November 2006 – 8 April 2018
- Prime Minister: Lee Hsien Loong
- Preceded by: Chiam See Tong
- Succeeded by: Pritam Singh

7th Secretary-General of the Workers' Party
- In office 27 May 2001 – 8 April 2018
- Chairperson: Tan Bin Seng; Sylvia Lim
- Vice-chairperson: Faisal Manap
- Preceded by: J. B. Jeyaretnam
- Succeeded by: Pritam Singh

Member of the Singapore Parliament for Aljunied GRC
- In office 7 May 2011 – 23 June 2020
- Preceded by: PAP held
- Succeeded by: WP held
- Majority: 2011: 12,460 (9.44%); 2015: 2,626 (1.92%)

Member of the Singapore Parliament for Hougang SMC
- In office 31 August 1991 – 6 May 2011
- Preceded by: Tang Guan Seng (PAP)
- Succeeded by: Yaw Shin Leong
- Majority: 1991: 1,134 (5.67%); 1997: 3,722 (16.04%); 2001: 2,188 (9.96%); 2006: 5,681 (25.48%)

Personal details
- Born: Low Thia Khiang; 5 September 1956 (age 70) Colony of Singapore
- Party: Workers' Party
- Spouse: Han Mui Keow (m. 1982)
- Children: 3
- Education: Nanyang University; National University of Singapore (BA)
- Profession: Politician; Businessman; Teacher

Low Thia Khiang (Note: Chinese: 刘程强; Pe̍h-ūe-jī: Lâu Thiâⁿ-khiâng; pinyin: Liú Chéngqiáng) (born 5 September 1956) is a Singaporean former politician who has served as the secretary-general of the Workers' Party (WP) between 2001 and 2018 and the de facto leader of the opposition between 2006 and 2018. He was the Member of Parliament (MP) for Hougang Single Member Constituency (SMC) from 1991 to 2011 and the Bedok Reservoir–Punggol division of Aljunied Group Representation Constituency (GRC) from 2011 to 2020.

Throughout his political career, Low was widely recognised for his tenacity and measured pragmatism. As one of only two opposition MPs in Parliament between 1997 and 2011, he played a pivotal role in maintaining parliamentary opposition representation during a period dominated by the governing People's Action Party (PAP). His leadership style, often characterised by consensus-building and party discipline, was credited with transforming the WP into a cohesive and electorally credible force.

In 2011, he led a landmark victory that saw the WP secure the first GRC won by an opposition party, representing the Bedok Reservoir–Punggol division of Aljunied GRC until his retirement. His tenure in Parliament, spanning 29 years, remains the longest of any opposition MP in Singapore's post-independence history.

In 2018, as part of a leadership renewal strategy, Low stepped down as secretary-general and was succeeded by Pritam Singh. He did not seek re-election in the 2020 general election but remained an influential presence within the party, continuing to serve on its Central Executive Committee (CEC) from 2022.

== Early life ==
Born and raised in Singapore during British colonial rule, Low was Chinese-educated and attended Lik Teck Primary School followed by Chung Cheng High School. He later enrolled at Nanyang University, where he majored in Chinese language and literature as well as government and public administration. In 1981, he graduated with a Bachelor of Arts (Honours) in Chinese studies from the National University of Singapore. The following year, in 1982, he obtained a diploma in education. Low worked as a teacher for several years before venturing into business.

== Political career ==
=== 1982–1991: Early political career ===
Low joined the WP in 1982, and was subsequently appointed as its Organising Secretary. At the 1984 general election, he was the election agent for the party's secretary-general, J. B. Jeyaretnam, in his successful campaign to retain Anson Constituency. Low was well known for giving speeches in Teochew, which won him much support from a large number of Teochew-speaking residents in Hougang SMC.

In 1988, Low represented the WP in a televised debate with the PAP government on proposals to create an elected presidency for Singapore, during which he engaged Ong Teng Cheong and Lee Hsien Loong, who later became the President and Prime Minister of Singapore respectively. In the general election later that year, Low, together with Gopalan Nair and Lim Lye Soon, contested Tiong Bahru GRC against the PAP and lost with 47.63% of the vote to the PAP's 52.37%.

=== 1991–2000: Parliamentary debut ===
When it came to the 1991 general election, I told JBJ that I want to go to [sic] a SMC, so he agreed. Actually, my first choice was Changi constituency (Changi SMC). I knew a bit of the background there and also the problems over there. But my then-party chairman (Tan Bin Seng) wanted to go to Changi because he stayed nearer to the constituency. So I said, OK, if that's the case, since the party chairman wanted to go, then I look for another SMC. Then I looked around, then OK, I think we- the Workers' Party participated in Hougang constituency in the 1988 election. The result, OK, I think it was just like a normal opposition ward, that's the percentage you get. So I decided, and OK, pack, let's go to Hougang SMC. That's how we started.

— Low Thia Khiang in his personal interview on Hougang documentary in 2024

In 1991, Low, as the Workers' Party's assistant secretary-general, won the Hougang SMC in the 1991 general election and entered Parliament for the first time. In Low's interview about Hougang in 2024, Low said he chose the Hougang division due to familiarities, and he would pave his way for then-chairman Tan Bin Seng to contest in his original choice of Changi. In 1992, Low was appointed by Prime Minister Goh Chok Tong as a member of the Cost Review Committee.

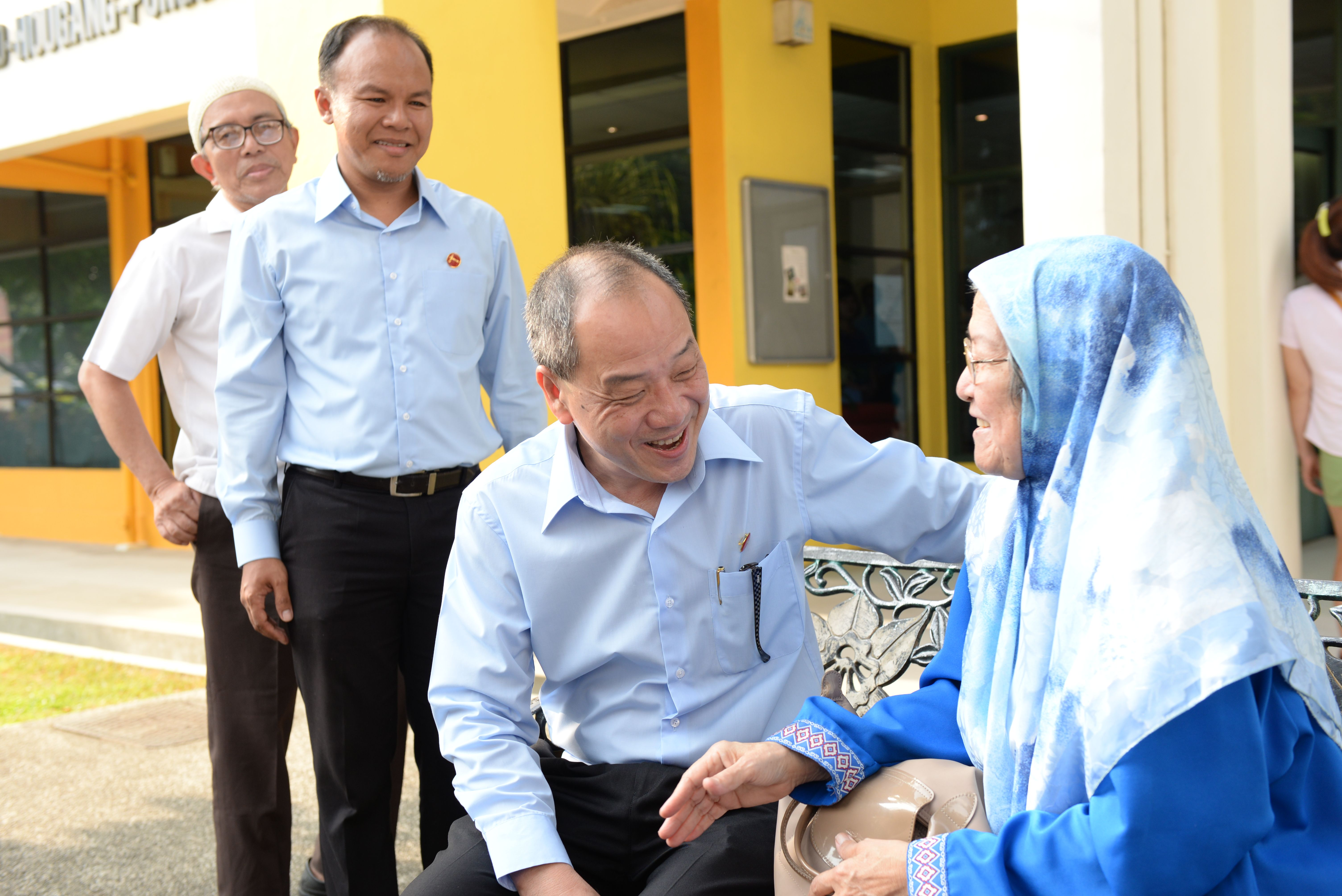
Low with a constituent in Hougang. (Faisal Manap, a fellow Aljunied GRC MP, pictured in background)

Low was re-elected as the MP for Hougang SMC with increased votes at the 1997 general election, his second election victory in Hougang.

=== 2001–2011: Early years of leadership of WP ===
Between 1997 and 2011, Low and Chiam See Tong from the Singapore People's Party (SPP) were the only elected opposition Members of Parliament (MP) in Parliament. Chiam later founded the Singapore Democratic Alliance (SDA) in 2001.

On 27 May 2001, Low became the secretary-general of the Workers' Party, replacing J. B. Jeyaretnam. Jeyaretnam handed over the position citing about the difficulties of paying damages and undischarged bankruptcy and seek to renew the party's mandate, as well as Jeyaretnam being stripped of his Non-constituency Member of Parliament two months after handing over.

In the 2001 general election, his party suffered a blunder where their proposed five-member team contesting Aljunied GRC ended up being disqualified for incomplete applications, which he called it as an "oversight" and an April Fools' joke, and took full responsibility for that blunder to happen. The WP ended up contesting only two seats, in Hougang and Nee Soon East; he was re-elected again as the MP for Hougang.

Ahead of the 2006 general elections, Low published his party's manifesto for the first time in 12 years, criticizing the government's manifesto as "time-bombs", which the government openly refuted. In that election, both he and Chiam each fielded 20 candidates for their parties to contest in that election. Low won his fourth consecutive election in his Hougang constituency with a positive 7.74% swing. His party vote share outperformed that of Chiam and winning one more Non-constituency Member of Parliament (which was given to his party chairwoman Sylvia Lim), making WP the largest opposition party (which had been the case since then) and Low becoming the new de facto Opposition Leader.

=== 2011–2016: Success with GRC and AHTC lawsuits ===
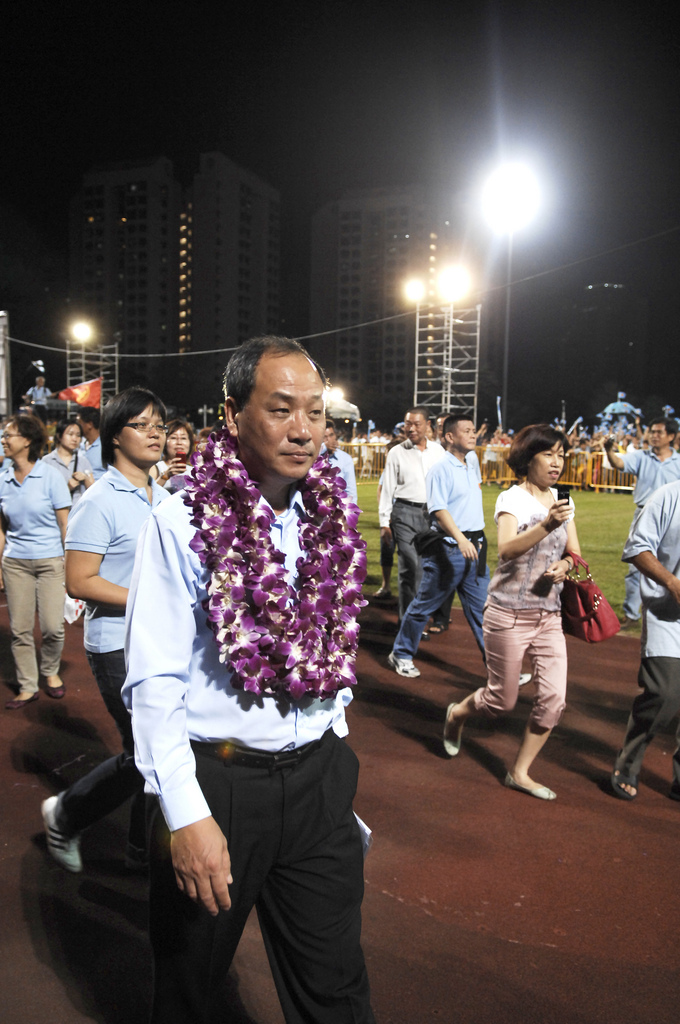
Low Thia Khiang at a Workers' Party general election rally at Bedok Stadium during the 2011 election campaign.

During the 2011 general election, Low announced that he had vacated his Hougang seat to challenge the neighbouring Aljunied GRC and gave his spot to Yaw Shin Leong, citing that he would take a risk of losing safe seats and his seat in Parliament by contesting a Group Representation Constituency. His team also include Lim and three new candidates making their debut, Chen Show Mao, Faisal Manap and Pritam Singh.

While Chiam, after his Singapore People's Party (SPP) departed from SDA, also did the same as Low as he challenged Bishan-Toa Payoh GRC while leaving his Potong Pasir SMC seat to his successor and wife Lina Loh, (Note: SPP's Loh would later became the Non-constituency Member of Parliament alongside two WP NCMPs in that election, as Loh had the closest result among the non-elected opposition candidates. As of the 2025 Singaporean general election, Potong Pasir was still won by the PAP.) neither of them were elected. However, the WP was able to retain Hougang and won Aljunied GRC, making the first instance an opposition party had captured a GRC. At the time, the percentage of the overall contested vote share was 46.60%, which was the highest for the party and the second biggest score for any contested opposition, only behind the SDP's score of 48.56% in 1991. (Note: As of the recent 2025 Singaporean general election, the highest score attained for Hougang was 64.80%; Chiam's score of 69.64% in 1991 remains unbeaten.) As a result, WP had won a total of eight represented seats, including two NCMPs, though the WP representation has since been increased. The election was also noted for the introductions of his future WP MPs Gerald Giam, Lee Li Lian and Png Eng Huat in 2011; He Ting Ru, Leon Perera and Dennis Tan in 2015. (Note: Png was elected in the 2012 Hougang by-election, and Lee in the 2013 Punggol East by-election, while the rest would eventually be elected as actual MPs in the 2020 election.)

Between the two elections, Low and his Aljunied GRC team faced public scrutiny for the Aljunied-Hougang Town Council management which becomes the subject of the Parliamentary debate, in which he, and then-AHTC chairmen Lim and Singh, were involved. The saga at the time was the flashpoint topic during the subsequent election in 2015. In 2019, their team were found guilty for breaching their duties and were liable for damages. Low launched a fundraiser in 2017 to fund an appeal. Eventually, in 2023, the Court of Appeal ruled a successful appeal, resulting in their team awarded costs from the AHTC town councilors.

In 2015, media speculations surfaced that whether if Low would defend the seat of Aljunied GRC or have some changes in the lineup; however, Low and his WP later confirmed that his Aljunied GRC team would remain intact. Amidst a backdrop of a national swing to the PAP, Low and his team was re-elected in Aljunied GRC but with a drop of 3.76% to 50.96%, a narrow margin of 1.92% (2,626 votes). As the margin was within the 2% range, there was an election recount (which was called by the PAP team); the Elections Department confirmed that he was among the three divisions out of five that won the WP vote by thousands of votes (the other being Manap's Kaki Bukit and Singh's Eunos divisions), while the other two divisions (Lim's Paya Lebar (Note: The Paya Lebar division's PAP representative at the time of the election was Murali Pillai, who was later elected in the May 2016's by-election for Bukit Batok SMC (now under Jurong East-Bukit Batok GRC).) and Chen's Serangoon) lost by hundreds of votes to PAP. As a result, Low tied with Chiam for being elected the most number of times (six) as an opposition candidate, and would set to become the longest serving opposition candidate with 29 years, displacing Chiam's previous record of 26 years. In a post-election interview, Low told that the party had ran a good campaign, and had "withstand" the national swing and acknowledged the defeats of other constituencies, including Punggol East SMC in which Lee Li Lian had captured it in 2013. (Note: The Punggol East SMC was dissolved in 2020 and become part of the Sengkang GRC, which the WP later won and returned the Punggol East division back to WP's control.)

In the 2016 Central Executive Committee (CEC) elections for the WP, Low's position of secretary-general was contended by fellow Aljunied MP Chen Show Mao. This was the first time Low was challenged for the post since his premiership. Low retained his seat with 61 votes, to Chen's 45.

=== 2017–present: Handover and retirement ===
In 2017, Low announced at WP's 60th anniversary dinner at HarbourFront Centre that he would not be contesting for the post of secretary-general for the 2018 party elections and would step down to renew leadership in the WP after being at its helm for 17 years. On 8 April 2018, he handed over that role to Singh.

Minister for Trade and Industry Chan Chun Sing subsequently praised Low during the Parliament sitting on 15 May 2018 for the role he played in Parliament, acknowledging him as "a fellow Singaporean and very much part of Team Singapore", and saying that the PAP appreciated his "efforts to work together to build a better Singapore" despite disagreements on perspective and methods.

Low has remained politically active despite retiring from Parliament prior to the 2020 general election. On 20 April 2020, Low suffered a head injury and was hospitalized at the Khoo Teck Puat Hospital, though he had since been discharged. While during his rehabilitation, WP would announce that he, Chen and Hougang SMC Png Eng Huat would not run in that election, with his seat of Bedok Reservoir-Punggol being assumed by former NCMP Gerald Giam. WP stated that the move was to "broaden its leadership base and also remain in touch with the ground" due to the evolving electorate. In interviews following his decision, he hinted that he was unlikely to make a political comeback in the future, but he felt that his win in 2011 and his leadership were something he felt proud of, citing that "I felt my work was done". Despite his retirement, Low remained as the member of the party's CEC member.

Low initially insisted that he would want to participate in the 2025 election to mark his return, but on 7 December 2024, he announced his political retirement and endorsed Singh's leadership. In both of the elections that Singh's leaded, the WP won the overall contested vote to PAP for the first time with both seats being retained, and WP also captured a second GRC of Sengkang GRC. His successor Singh was also made as a de jure (Note: De jure, an official position in parliamentary proceedings.) opposition leader for the first time in Singapore's history, a post he held until 15 January 2026.

== Personal life ==
Low first met Han Mui Keow while they were students at Chung Cheng High School in 1973. They were married in 1982 and had two sons and a daughter. He is a Buddhist.

On 30 April 2020, Low sustained a head injury after a fall at his home and was subsequently hospitalised in the intensive care unit (ICU) at Khoo Teck Puat Hospital. He remained in the ICU for five days before being transferred to the general ward on 4 May. He continued his recovery in the general ward until he was discharged from hospital on 21 May. The injury reportedly affected his olfactory nerve centre, resulting in a loss of his sense of smell.

== See also ==
- List of Singapore opposition party MPs elected

== Notes ==
Parliament of Singapore
| Preceded by Chiam See Tong | Unofficial Leader of the Opposition; 2006–2018 | Succeeded by Pritam Singh |
| Preceded by Tang Guan Seng | Member of Parliament for Hougang; 1991–2011 | Succeeded by Yaw Shin Leong |
| Preceded by Lim Hwee Hua; Zainul Abidin; Yeo Guat Kwang; George Yeo; Cynthia Phua | Member of Parliament for Aljunied GRC; 2011 –2020; Served alongside: (2011-2015): Pritam Singh, Faisal Manap, Chen Show Mao, Sylvia Lim (2015-2020): Pritam Singh, Faisal Manap, Chen Show Mao, Sylvia Lim | Succeeded by Gerald Giam; Pritam Singh; Faisal Manap; Sylvia Lim; Leon Perera |
Party political offices
| Preceded by J.B. Jeyaretnam | Secretary-General of the Workers' Party; 2001–2018 | Succeeded by Pritam Singh |
