= Zainul Abidin (politician) =

Singaporean politician

- زین العابدین

Singapore Ambassador to the State of Kuwait
- In office 27 October 2011 – 18 February 2025
- President: Tony Tan; Halimah Yacob; Tharman Shanmugaratnam
- Prime Minister: Lee Hsien Loong
- Preceded by: Wong Kwok Pun
- Succeeded by: Abu Bakar Mohd Nor

Senior Minister of State for Foreign Affairs
- In office 30 May 2006 – 20 May 2011
- Prime Minister: Lee Hsien Loong
- Preceded by: Position established
- Succeeded by: Masagos Zulkifli

Mayor of North East District
- In office 24 November 2001 – 30 May 2009
- Prime Minister: Goh Chok Tong; Lee Hsien Loong
- Preceded by: Position established
- Succeeded by: Teo Ser Luck

Member of the Singapore Parliament for Aljunied GRC
- In office 25 October 2001 – 18 April 2011
- Preceded by: PAP held
- Succeeded by: WP gain
- Majority: 16,225 (56.10%)

Member of the Singapore Parliament for Cheng San GRC
- In office 2 January 1997 – 18 October 2001
- Preceded by: Constituency established
- Succeeded by: Constituency abolished
- Majority: 9,421 (54.80%)

Personal details
- Born: Zainul Abidin bin Mohamed Rasheed; 17 March 1948 (age 78) Colony of Singapore
- Other political affiliations: People's Action Party (1997—2011)
- Children: 4
- Education: National University of Singapore
- Occupation: Diplomat; politician; journalist

Zainul Abidin bin Mohamed Rasheed (Note: Jawi: زین العابدین بن محمد رشيد) (born 17 March 1948) is a Singaporean diplomat, former politician and journalist. A member of the People's Action Party (PAP), Zainul was the Member of Parliament (MP) of Cheng San Group Representation Constituency (GRC) from 1997 to 2001 and of Aljunied GRC between 2001 and 2011. Zainul was the Mayor of North East District from 2001 to 2009

Zainul also served as Senior Minister of State for Foreign Affairs between 2006 and 2011 and the Singapore Ambassador to the State of Kuwait and Special Envoy to the Middle East from 2011 to 2025.

== Education ==
Zainul attended Jalan Daud Primary School and Raffles Institution before graduating from the National University of Singapore where he majored in economics. He was also awarded the Gold Outstanding Young Singaporean Award in 1974.

== Career ==
=== Journalistic career ===
Zainul worked as a journalist with Singapore Press Holdings between 1976 and 1996, working as an editor for the Asia News Bulletin, Berita Harian and The Sunday Times, and then Associate Editor of The Straits Times, before being seconded to the government sector.

=== Political career ===
Zainul first stood for the 1997 Singapore general elections under the People's Action Party (PAP) under Cheng San Group Representation Constituency (GRC), against the Workers' Party (WP), whose notable candidates were J. B. Jeyaratnam and Tang Liang Hong. The PAP won the constituency.

Zainul was appointed Senior Parliamentary Secretary for the Ministry of Foreign Affairs from 1998 – 2001.

Zainul later moved to Aljunied GRC for the 2001 general elections where there is a walkover. He was then appointed Minister of State for the Ministry of Foreign Affairs in 2004.

He remained in Aljunied GRC for the 2006 general elections where the WP also contested in the ward. The PAP team won the elections with 56.09% of the votes. He was subsequently given a Senior Minister of State role in 2006 to 2011.

He also held the post of Mayor of the Northeast Community Development Council from 2001 to 2008.

In the 2011 general elections, Zainul was part of the PAP team which lost Aljunied GRC to the WP consists of Low Thia Khiang, Pritam Singh, Sylvia Lim, Muhamad Faisal Manap and Chen Show Mao. In a post-election interview, he suggested that Lee Kuan Yew's remarks on Malays, Muslims and integration in his book, Hard Truths to Keep Singapore Going, may have had some influence over the Malay votes, and "many were hurt by those remarks and remain so." During the campaign, Prime Minister Lee Hsien Loong intended to nominate Zainul as Speaker of Parliament in the event the PAP Aljunied team were re-elected on election day but it did not happen as the PAP team in Aljunied GRC lost to the WP led by Low Thia Khiang and Lee eventually nominated Michael Palmer as speaker.

Prior to the 2011 presidential election, Zainul declined to announce a candidacy on 29 May, but did not categorically rule out a run, declaring that he wished to take a break before making any decisions. He did not make any further statements on a possible campaign afterwards.

=== Corporate and public service appointments ===
Zainul was a member of the Majlis Ugama Islam Singapura (MUIS) from 1986 to 1988. He then served in Mendaki from 1990 to 1993.

He has held various appointments, among them being:

- Member of the National University of Singapore Council,
- Member of the board of trustees, NTUC Healthcare Co-operative Ltd
- Member of the Board of directors of Mendaki Holdings
- Member of the RI Board of Governors
- Advisor of the Singapore Port Workers Union
- Ex-deputy Chairman of the Malay Heritage Foundation
- Member of the National Medical Ethics Committee

In September 2011, after the general elections, Zainul was appointed as the chairman SPH UnionWorks, owned by the Singapore Press Holdings, which operates two Singapore radio stations 91.3FM and 100.3FM. He was also named as the consultant of the book publishing arm SPH's book publishing arm, Straits Times Press (STP).

Zainul also serves on the boards of various local and international companies including Chairman of Diamond Electric Pte Ltd, deputy chairman, lead independent director of Australian-listed OM Holdings, Member of Board of Directors of Mediacorp, Board Member of National Volunteer Philanthropy Centre and Director of Temasek Cares. He also serves as a corporate adviser to Temasek International.

=== Diplomatic career ===
On 27 October 2011, Zainul was appointed non-resident Ambassador to Kuwait and a special envoy of the Minister for Foreign Affairs to the Middle East.

== Personal life ==
Zainul is married and has 3 sons and a daughter.

== Notes ==
Parliament of Singapore
| New constituency | Member of Parliament for Cheng San GRC; 1997–2001 | Constituency abolished |
| Preceded by Sidek Saniff | Member of Parliament for Aljunied GRC; 2001–2011 | Succeeded by Pritam Singh |
Diplomatic posts
| Unknown Last known title holder: Wong Kwok Pun | Singapore Ambassador to the State of Kuwait; 27 October 2011 – 18 February 2025 (Non-resident) | Succeeded by Abu Bakar Mohd Nor |
Government offices
| New office | Mayor of North East District; 2001–2009 | Succeeded by Teo Ser Luck |
