= Aljunied Group Representation Constituency =

Electoral division in Singapore

Aljunied
- Group representation constituency for the Parliament of Singapore
- Region: North-East and East Regions, Singapore
- Electorate: 144,032

Current constituency
- Created: 1988; 38 years ago
- Seats: 5
- Party: Workers' Party
- Members: Fadli Fawzi; Gerald Giam; Sylvia Lim; Pritam Singh; Kenneth Tiong
- Town Council: Aljunied–Hougang
- Created from: Aljunied Constituency; Kampong Kembangan Constituency; Kampong Ubi Constituency

The Aljunied Group Representation Constituency is a five-member group representation constituency (GRC) in north-eastern and eastern Singapore. It has five divisions: Bedok Reservoir–Punggol, Eunos, Kaki Bukit, Paya Lebar and Serangoon, managed by Aljunied–Hougang Town Council. The current Members of Parliament (MPs) for the constituency are Fadli Fawzi, Gerald Giam, Sylvia Lim, Pritam Singh, and Kenneth Tiong from the Workers' Party (WP).

== History ==
=== 1988–2000: Creation and SDP contests ===
Aljunied GRC was formed in 1988 and was won by the governing People's Action Party (PAP) against the Singapore Democratic Party (SDP) with 56.33% of the vote. It was uncontested in 1991. The SDP returned to the GRC in 1997, but with a much poorer result compared to 1988, garnering 32.98% of the vote compared to the 43.67% they had previously garnered.

=== 2001–2010: Entry of WP and 2006 general election ===
Aljunied GRC was uncontested again in 2001; the WP had attempted to nominate a team for the GRC, however, it was disqualified. In 2006, the WP successfully nominated a team for the GRC, which lost with 43.91% of the vote. By virtue of the WP team's performance, the sole non-constituency MP (NCMP) seat at the election was offered to one of their members; Sylvia Lim accepted it.

=== 2011–present: WP representation ===
In 2011, party leader Low Thia Khiang, who had left his seat at Hougang Single Member Constituency (SMC), led a WP team in Aljunied GRC against the PAP team led by George Yeo and Lim Hwee Hua. With 54.72% of the vote, they won the first GRC for the opposition since the creation of GRCs in 1988. Yeo and Lim were the first two cabinet ministers since Singaporean independence, as well as the 1963 election, to be defeated for reelection. During the campaign, then-Minister Mentor Lee Kuan Yew threatened that voters in Aljunied GRC would "repent" for the following five years if they voted for the WP, leading to post-election speculation that the threat had backfired for the PAP.

==== 2015: Vote recount and near-loss ====
In 2015, a PAP team led by Yeo Guat Kwang, then-MP for Ang Mo Kio GRC and former MP for Aljunied GRC, contested Aljunied GRC. After the vote count was completed, said team requested a recount as the initial difference in votes between the PAP and WP teams was under 2% of the vote. Following the recount, Aljunied GRC's electoral result was declared last at around 3.10am the morning after Election Day; the unchanged WP team retained it by 1.9% of the vote, or 2,612 votes. (Note: 1.92% or 2,626 votes after counting of overseas votes.) It was later revealed that the PAP had won in the divisions of Serangoon and Paya Lebar, which Yeo and Murali Pillai would respectively have represented, by around 300 votes each.

==== 2020: WP entrenchment ====
In 2020, Low and Chen Show Mao declined to run for re-election. Led by new party leader Pritam Singh, the WP retained the GRC with 59.95% of the vote, a positive swing of 9% from the previous election.

==== Resignation of Leon Perera ====
In July 2023, a video surfaced that allegedly showed Leon Perera holding hands "intimately" with fellow WP member Nicole Seah. On 19 July, Singh revealed that the two had begun an affair some time after the 2020 general election, which had ended before the video surfaced. Perera resigned from Parliament and the WP on the same day while Seah had already done so the previous day. After Perera's resignation, the workload for Serangoon was distributed among the other MPs for Aljunied GRC.

==== 2025 general election ====
In August 2024, the PAP appointed Jagathishwaran Rajo and Kenny Sim to replace Chua Eng Leong and Alex Yeo respectively as the chairpersons of the Eunos and Paya Lebar PAP branches. The PAP again replaced three of its five branch chairpersons (Note: Another name for a "grassroots advisor", an individual appointed for "grassroots engagement and outreach" in a GRC division or SMC who, according to the People's Association (PA), has to be aligned with the "Government of the day". They do not need to be the elected MP for the area.) for Aljunied GRC in February 2025, appointing Faisal Abdul Aziz, Daniel Liu and Adrian Ang to replace Kenny Sim, Shamsul Kamar and Victor Lye.

On 11 March 2025, the Elections Department (ELD) updated the electoral divisions for the general election later in the same year. Polling districts in Aljunied GRC to the east of Bedok Reservoir were absorbed by Tampines GRC; the number of MPs for Aljunied GRC remained at five. This was the first time an opposition-held constituency had its boundaries redrawn.

Prior to the same election, the WP announced 2 new candidates for the GRC: Fadli Fawzi and Kenneth Tiong. They were to contest alongside the incumbent MPs, Pritam Singh, Sylvia Lim and Gerald Giam except Faisal Manap, who chose to contest in Tampines GRC, a decision Singh later described as fulfilling a long-standing wish for Faisal. Despite a national swing towards the PAP, the WP retained the GRC with 59.71% of the vote, a vote share similar to that of 2020.

== Members of Parliament ==
Divisions or wards of Aljunied GRC as of the 2025 general election:
1 Bedok Reservoir–Punggol
2 Eunos
3 Kaki Bukit
4 Paya Lebar
5 Serangoon

Election	Division	Members of Parliament	Party
Formation
1988	Aljunied; Kampong Kembangan; Kampong Ubi	Chin Harn Tong; George Yeo; Wan Hussin B H Zoohri	PAP
1991	Aljunied; Kampong Kembangan; Kampong Ubi; Paya Lebar	Chin Harn Tong; George Yeo; Mohamad Maidin Packer; Ker Sin Tze	PAP
1997	Aljunied; Changi–Simei; Eunos; Kampong Kembangan; Paya Lebar	Toh See Kiat; David Lim; Sidek Saniff; George Yeo; Ker Sin Tze	PAP
2001	Aljunied–Kembangan; Aljunied–Hougang; Eunos; Kembangan–Punggol; Paya Lebar	Ong Seh Hong; Yeo Guat Kwang; Zainul Abidin; George Yeo; Cynthia Phua	PAP
2006	Aljunied–Hougang; Bedok Reservoir–Punggol; Eunos; Paya Lebar; Serangoon	Yeo Guat Kwang; George Yeo; Zainul Abidin; Cynthia Phua; Lim Hwee Hua	PAP
2011	Bedok Reservoir–Punggol; Eunos; Kaki Bukit; Paya Lebar; Serangoon	Low Thia Khiang; Pritam Singh; Faisal Manap; Chen Show Mao; Sylvia Lim	WP
2015	Bedok Reservoir–Punggol; Eunos; Kaki Bukit; Paya Lebar; Serangoon	Low Thia Khiang; Pritam Singh; Faisal Manap; Chen Show Mao; Sylvia Lim	WP
2020	Bedok Reservoir–Punggol; Eunos; Kaki Bukit; Paya Lebar; Serangoon	Gerald Giam; Pritam Singh; Faisal Manap; Sylvia Lim; Leon Perera (2020-2023) (Note: Perera resigned in 2023 after his affair was exposed.)	WP
2025	Bedok Reservoir–Punggol; Eunos; Kaki Bukit; Paya Lebar; Serangoon	Gerald Giam; Pritam Singh; Fadli Fawzi; Sylvia Lim; Kenneth Tiong	WP

== Electoral results ==
Note: The Elections Department does not include rejected votes when calculating the vote shares of candidates. Hence, all candidates' vote shares will total to 100% at any given election (may not appear so in multi-way contests due to rounding).

=== Elections in 1980s ===
General Election 1988
Party	Candidate	Votes	%
PAP	Chin Harn Tong George Yeo Wan Hussin Zoohri	34,020	56.33
SDP	Jufrie Mahmood Ashleigh Seow Neo Choon Aik	26,375	43.67
Majority		7,645	12.67
Total valid votes		98.06	60,395
Rejected ballots		1,197	1.94
Turnout		61,592	94.24
Registered electors		65,351	
PAP win (new seat)			

=== Elections in 1990s ===
General Election 1991
Party	Candidate	Votes	%	±%
PAP	Chin Harn Tong; George Yeo; Mohamad Maidin bin Packer; Ker Sin Tze	Unopposed		
Registered electors		94,490		▲44.59
PAP hold				

General Election 1997
Party	Candidate	Votes	%	±%
PAP	Toh See Kiat David Lim Sidek Saniff George Yeo Ker Sin Tze	64,299	67.02	N/A
SDP	Aziz Ibrahim Kwan Yue Keng S. Kunalen Tay Hoon Wong Hong Toy	31,645	32.98	N/A
Majority		32,954	34.04	N/A
Total valid votes		95,944	97.00	N/A
Rejected ballots		2,971	3.00	N/A
Turnout		98,915	95.60	N/A
Registered electors		103,466		▲9.50
PAP hold				

=== Elections in 2000s ===
General Election 2001
Party	Candidate	Votes	%	±%
PAP	Ong Seh Hong; Yeo Guat Kwang; George Yeo; Zainul Abidin; Cynthia Phua	Unopposed		
Registered electors		125,115		▲20.92
PAP hold				

General Election 2006
Party	Candidate	Votes	%	±%
PAP	Yeo Guat Kwang George Yeo Zainul Abidin Cynthia Phua Lim Hwee Hua	74,843	56.09	N/A
WP	Goh Meng Seng James Gomez Sylvia Lim Mohammed Rahizan Bin Yaacob Tan Wui-Hua	58,593	43.91	N/A
Majority		16,250	12.18	N/A
Total valid votes		133,436	98.25	N/A
Rejected ballots		2,381	1.75	N/A
Turnout		135,817	93.58	N/A
Registered electors		145,141		▲16.00
PAP hold				

=== Elections in 2010s ===
General Election 2011
Party	Candidate	Votes	%	±%
WP	Low Thia Khiang Sylvia Lim Faisal Manap Chen Show Mao Pritam Singh	72,289	54.72	▲10.81
PAP	George Yeo Lim Hwee Hua Zainul Abidin Cynthia Phua Ong Ye Kung	59,829	45.28	▼10.81
Majority		12,460	9.44	▼2.74
Total valid votes		132,118	98.66	▲0.41
Rejected ballots		1,788	1.34	▼0.41
Turnout		133,906	93.54	▼0.04
Registered electors		143,148		▼1.37
WP gain from PAP		Swing	▲10.81	

General Election 2015
Party	Candidate	Votes	%	±%
WP	Low Thia Khiang Sylvia Lim Faisal Manap Chen Show Mao Pritam Singh	70,050	50.96	▼3.76
PAP	Yeo Guat Kwang Victor Lye Chua Eng Leong Shamsul Kamar Murali Pillai	67,424	49.04	▲3.76
Majority		2,626	1.92	▼7.52
Total valid votes		137,474	98.82	▲0.16
Rejected ballots		1,638	1.18	▼0.16
Turnout		139,112	93.90	▲0.36
Registered electors		148,142		▲3.48
WP hold		Swing	▼3.76	

=== Elections in 2020s ===
General Election 2020
Party	Candidate	Votes	%	±%
WP	Gerald Giam Sylvia Lim Faisal Manap Leon Perera Pritam Singh	85,815	59.95	▲8.99
PAP	Victor Lye Chua Eng Leong Shamsul Kamar Chan Hui Yuh Alex Yeo	57,330	40.05	▼8.99
Majority		28,485	19.90	▲17.98
Total valid votes		143,145	98.91	▲0.09
Rejected ballots		1,582	1.09	▼0.09
Turnout		144,727	95.96	▲2.06
Registered electors		150,821		▲1.81
WP hold		Swing	▲8.99	

General Election 2025
Party	Candidate	Votes	%	±%
WP	Fadli Fawzi Gerald Giam Sylvia Lim Pritam Singh Kenneth Tiong	79,254	59.71	▼0.24
PAP	Chan Hui Yuh Adrian Ang Daniel Liu Faisal Abdul Aziz Jagathiswaran Rajo	53,471	40.29	▲0.24
Majority		25,783	19.42	▼0.48
Total valid votes		132,725	99.00	▲0.09
Rejected ballots		1,342	1.00	▼0.09
Turnout		134,067	92.91	▼3.05
Registered electors		144,298		▼4.32
WP hold		Swing	▼0.24	
