= Chen Show Mao =

Singaporean politician

- 陈硕茂
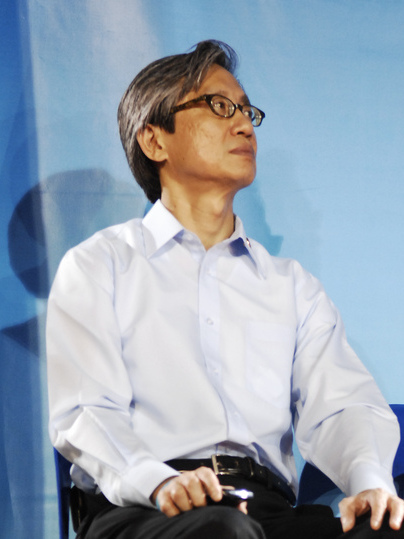
- Chen in 2011

Member of the Singapore Parliament for Aljunied GRC
- In office 7 May 2011 – 23 June 2020
- Preceded by: PAP held
- Succeeded by: WP held
- Majority: 2011: 12,460 (9.44%); 2015: 2,626 (1.92%)

Personal details
- Born: 6 February 1961 (age 65) Linbian, Pingtung, Taiwan
- Party: Workers' Party
- Children: 3
- Education: Harvard University; University of Oxford; Stanford University
- Occupation: politician, lawyer

Chen Show Mao (Chinese: 陈硕茂; pinyin: Chén Shuòmào; born 6 February 1961) is a Taiwanese-born Singaporean former politician. A member of the Workers' Party (WP), he was the Member of Parliament for the Paya Lebar division of Aljunied Group Representation Constituency (GRC) between 2011 and 2020.

Prior to politics, Chen was a corporate lawyer at Davis Polk from 1992 to 2011 and scaled back in active practice after his political debut. Chen made his political debut in the 2011 general election when he joined a five-member WP team for Aljunied GRC, which defeated the governing People's Action Party (PAP) with 54.72% of the vote. This was the first opposition victory in a GRC. He stepped down in 2020.

== Background ==
Chen was born in Pingtung County, Taiwan. His father was a trader while his mother was an elementary school teacher. He moved to Singapore when he was 11, and studied at Nanyang Primary School, Catholic High School, Anglo-Chinese School and National Junior College. He was the president of the students' council in National Junior College and was the top student for the Singapore-Cambridge GCE Advanced Level examinations in 1979, outperforming his batchmates Vivian Balakrishnan and Lui Tuck Yew. After he failed to gain admission into the medical school at the National University of Singapore, he applied to study economics at Harvard University and was accepted.

Between 1980 and 1983, Chen, then a Singapore permanent resident, performed National Service and served as an infantry platoon commander at the 5th Singapore Infantry Regiment and as a brigade adjutant (DYS1) at the headquarters of the 3rd Singapore Infantry Brigade. He became a Singapore citizen in 1986.

Chen graduated with a Bachelor of Arts from Harvard University in 1986 and subsequently completed a Master of Arts in 1988 under a Rhodes Scholarship at Corpus Christi College of the University of Oxford. He completed a Juris Doctor at Stanford Law School in 1992 and attained the rank of Master of Arts at Corpus Christi College in 2005.

== Legal career ==
Chen is a partner in the corporate department of Davis Polk & Wardwell and a managing partner of the Beijing office. An experienced lawyer, he has practised in the New York office since 1992, the Hong Kong office since 1999 and the Beijing office since 2007.

On 1 July 2011, Chen announced on his Facebook page that he had retired from active practice as a partner of his law firm given his new responsibilities as an MP. The decision was made so that he can spend more time with his family, to better serve his constituency and country, and that he would be exploring alternative work arrangements.

== Political career ==
During his time abroad, Chen regularly returned home to Singapore to visit his parents, his sister, and her family.

Chen stated that he joined the WP because he believed that "the best way to ensure good governance for Singapore is through the growth of a competitive opposition that offers a credible alternative to the party in government". During an interview, Chen frankly explained why he decided to join the WP:

Certainly, my friends in the PAP are in a better position to formulate policy and implement policy in the short term, and therefore, have a greater impact on people's life, people's livelihood over the short term. But I think what I am doing is just as important. Perhaps more important over the long term and that is to help build up a credible opposition that in time is capable to form an alternative government.

— Chen Show Mao

On 27 April 2011, Chen submitted his candidacy for the five-member Aljunied Group Representation Constituency (Aljunied GRC) with the WP's Secretary-General Low Thia Khiang, Chairman Sylvia Lim, Pritam Singh, a postgraduate law student, and Muhamad Faisal Abdul Manap, a freelance counsellor. The incumbent team included two cabinet ministers and one Senior Minister of State, and was helmed by the prominent Minister for Foreign Affairs, George Yeo.

During the intense nine-day campaign period that followed, Chen was singled out by leaders of the ruling People's Action Party (PAP) for criticism. The PAP's Organising Secretary and Minister for Education, Ng Eng Hen, questioned Chen's motives for entering politics in a letter to The Straits Times. Ng also questioned whether Chen would be able to relate to the aspirations of Singaporeans after having spent most of his career in the United States and China. The PAP's co-founder and former Prime Minister Lee Kuan Yew also suggested that Chen could return to China after losing in the election.

Throughout the campaign, Chen kept a low profile when the WP was faced with tough questions, instead allowing frontman Low Thia Khiang to take the heat. He displayed his affinity with regular Singaporean culture and Singaporeans by addressing crowds at rallies with smatterings of Malay and Hokkien to dispel the notion that he was a "foreigner", as he had spent many years abroad. He also highlighted at a WP rally that he came to Singapore at a young age with his parents and sister, that he served National Service, and that he owns an apartment in Bishan and frequently commutes by train.

On 7 May 2011, Chen and his WP team won the Aljunied GRC with 54.71% of the total votes cast, with Yeo's PAP team obtaining 45.29% of the votes. The victory was considered historic because it was the first time that GRC seats had been captured by an opposition party, and the first time that two cabinet ministers had lost their parliamentary seats in a general election. Chen became the first foreign-born opposition MP in the history of Singapore, while his teammates Sylvia Lim and Muhamad Faisal Manap became the first female opposition MP and the first Malay opposition MP respectively. Also, together with Pritam Singh and Muhamad Faisal bin Abdul Manap, he became one of the first three opposition MPs to be elected into parliament at the first attempt.

In the Singapore General Election 2015, the WP candidates successfully defended Aljunied GRC against a PAP team with little political experience. Their vote share was reduced to 50.95%. He served as the Member of Parliament (MP) of Aljunied GRC for Paya Lebar from 7 May 2011 to his retirement as MP on 23 June 2020 and was succeeded by Sylvia Lim.

In May 2016, Chen challenged the incumbent Secretary-General and leader of the Workers' Party Low Thia Khiang for the position and lost. In September of the same year, it was reported by the press that Chen quit as Treasurer but still remained on the Exco as a council member. Chen however later clarified that his tenure ended.

Chen has remained politically active despite retiring from Parliament prior to the 2020 general election.

=== Committee of Selection ===
On 15 October 2011, it was announced that Chen was nominated to sit on the Committee of Selection, making him the first non-People's Action Party MP to be named to this committee.

== Political positions ==
In his maiden speech in Parliament, Chen stated how he saw himself as an opposition MP, saying that "I may challenge government policy ... perform my role to voice alternative and opposing views ... but it does not mean I do not support the government in its work". Chen further added that "I am not the enemy of the government. I am a Singaporean, a patriot." During the Ministerial Salary Review debate in January 2012, Chen further expressed his opinion that political office is a calling and should neither be treated as a discount factor, nor be monetised.

Together with his fellow WP opposition MPs, Chen questioned the 2013 Population White Paper. In his speech on 5 February 2014, Chen proposed instead to increase the resident workforce growth of Singapore citizens and permanent residents by up to 1% per year till 2030. He also proposed that the foreign workforce size be held constant except when growth targets for the resident labour force are not met. Previously, Chen had suggested redefining industry segments when considering the issue of foreign worker dependency.

Within parliament and at WP election rallies, Chen has called for more recognition and support for older Singaporeans, including the promotion of industries catering to the older population. He has also called for welfare and government support for older Singaporeans and their caregivers to be more accessible. Chen and his fellow WP colleagues have called for acknowledging the contributions of matured Singaporean workers.

In addition to older Singaporeans, Chen also advocated for investing in the poorer, disabled segments of society, terming this as an "unlocking social value". Other subjects Chen has spoken on in parliament include angel funding for the arts, data protection, casino control, and scholarships for regional studies.

== Personal life ==
Chen is married and has three children, one of whom is deceased. His wife, a homemaker, was born in Taiwan and grew up in Indonesia, then emigrated to the United States with her family.

Parliament of Singapore
Preceded by George Yeo, Cynthia Phua, Zainul Abidin bin Mohamed Rasheed, Lim Hwee Hua, Faishal Ibrahim	Member of Parliament for Aljunied Group Representation Constituency; 21 May 2011 – 23 June 2020; Served alongside: Low Thia Khiang, Sylvia Lim, Pritam Singh, Muhamad Faisal Abdul Manap	Succeeded by Pritam Singh, Sylvia Lim, Muhamad Faisal Manap, Gerald Giam, Leon Perera
