= Sylvia Lim =

Singaporean politician and lawyer (born 1965)

The Honourable Sylvia Lim
- 林瑞莲
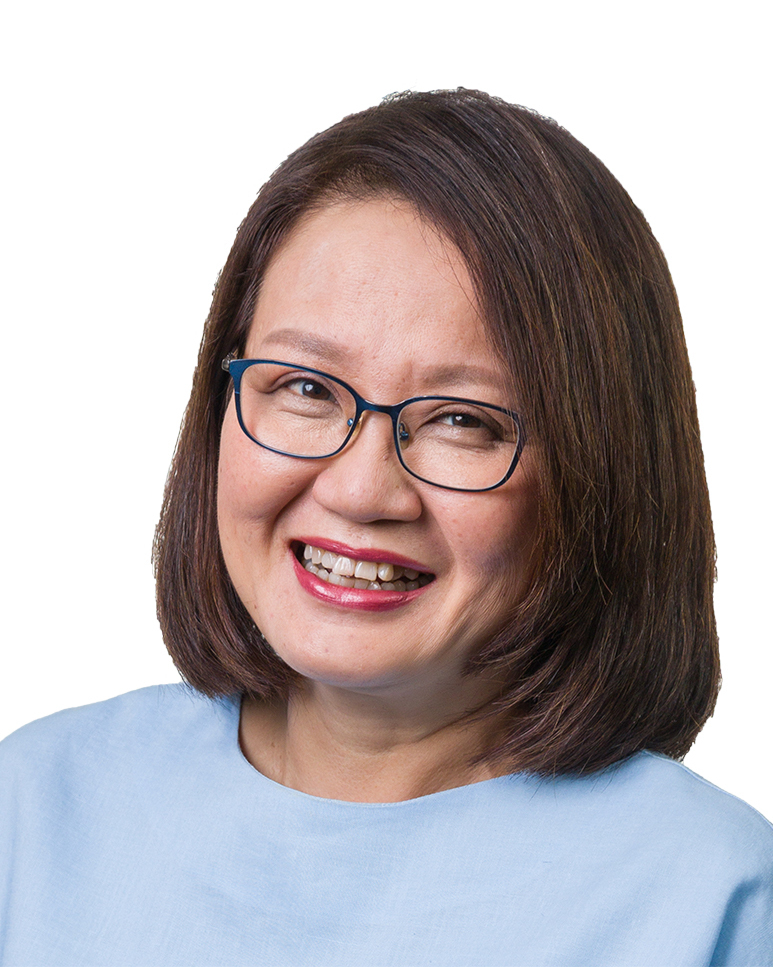
- Official portrait, 2021

10th Chair of the Workers' Party
- Incumbent
- Assumed office 2 June 2003
- Vice-Chairman: Faisal Manap
- Secretary-General: Low Thia Khiang; Pritam Singh
- Preceded by: Tan Bin Seng

Member of Parliament for Aljunied GRC
- Incumbent
- Assumed office 7 May 2011
- Preceded by: PAP held
- Majority: 2011: 12,460 (9.44%); 2015: 2,626 (1.92%); 2020: 28,485 (19.90%); 2025: 25,783 (19.42%)

Non-Constituency Member of the 11th Parliament of Singapore
- In office 11 May 2006 – 18 April 2011
- Preceded by: Steve Chia
- Succeeded by: Lina Chiam; Yee Jenn Jong; Gerald Giam

Personal details
- Born: Sylvia Lim Swee Lian; 28 March 1965 (age 61) State of Singapore, Malaysia
- Party: Workers' Party
- Spouse: Quah Kim Song (m. 2025)
- Education: National University of Singapore (LLB); University College London (LLM); Michigan State University (MS)
- Occupation: Politician; lawyer; lecturer

Sylvia Lim Swee Lian (Note: Chinese: 林瑞莲; Pe̍h-ōe-jī: Lîm Sūi-liân; pinyin: Lín Ruìlián) (born 28 March 1965) is a Singaporean politician and lawyer who has served as the chairperson of the Workers' Party since 2003. Lim has been the Non-Constituency Member of Parliament (NCMP) between 2006 and 2011. She has been the Member of Parliament (MP) for the Paya Lebar division of Aljunied Group Representation Constituency (GRC) since 2020.

Before entering politics, Lim had served in the Singapore Police Force (SPF) and worked as a law lecturer. One week after the 2011 general election, she announced that she would be resigning from her job after 12 years on account of what she anticipated to be an increased workload after her election to Parliament. During the same year, Lim also re-entered the legal sector. She is currently serving as counsel at Peter Low Chambers LLC.

== Early life ==
Lim attended CHIJ Our Lady of Good Counsel, CHIJ St. Joseph's Convent and National Junior College before graduating from the National University of Singapore in 1988 with a Bachelor of Laws degree with honours. She went on to complete a Master of Laws at the University College London in 1989, and was called to the bar in Singapore in 1991. She later completed an online master's degree in criminal justice from the Michigan State University in 2014.

During her undergraduate and postgraduate studies, Lim did volunteer work with the Spastic Children's Association, Salvation Army Home for the Aged and University College Hospital. She later did voluntary editorial work for the Criminal Legal Aid Scheme of the Law Society of Singapore.

== Career ==
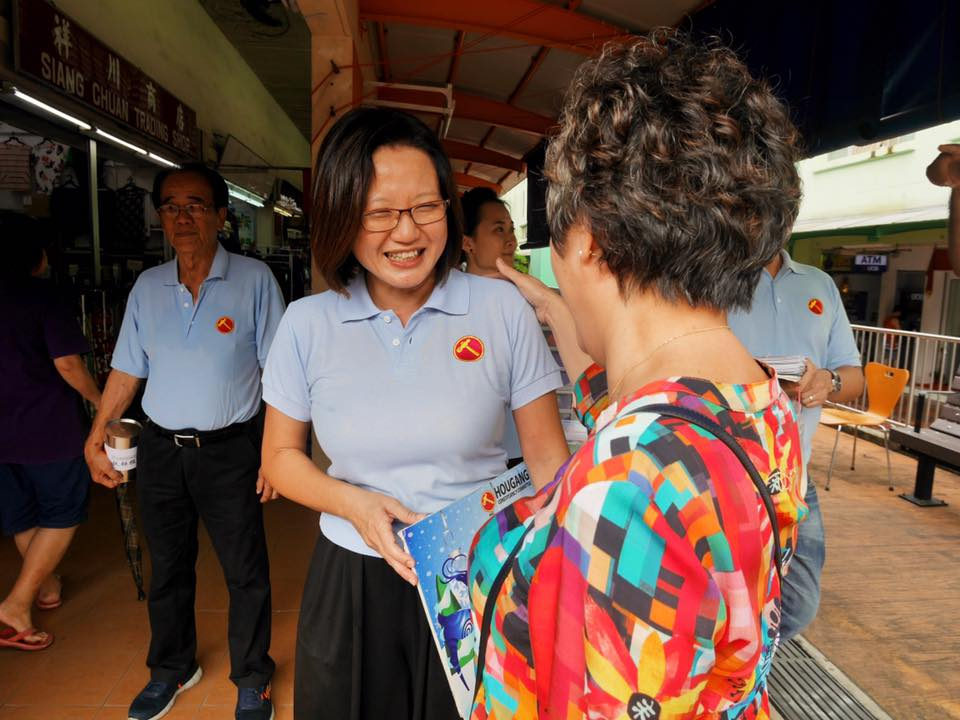
Lim on a walkabout

In 1991, Lim joined the Singapore Police Force for three years as a police inspector. She initially did investigation work at the Central Police Division Headquarters, and then became a staff officer under the Director of the Criminal Investigation Department.

Lim joined the law firm M/s Lim & Lim in 1994. She handled litigation work both civil and criminal cases in the High Court, Subordinate Courts and Juvenile Court between 1994 and 1998.

Lim joined Temasek Polytechnic in 1998 as a law lecturer. She was also the Manager of Professional Development and Manager of Continuing Education and Training at the polytechnic's School of Business. Her main areas of teaching and research were in civil and criminal procedure, criminal justice and private security. During her time at Temasek Polytechnic, Lim contributed to the volume on Criminal Procedure for Halsbury's Laws of Singapore (2003), a legal practitioners' reference series, and has also collected and published primary research on private security in Singapore.

In March 2006, Temasek Polytechnic modified its staffing policies to enable Lim to run as a candidate in the general election without having to resign her teaching position at the institution.

== Political career ==
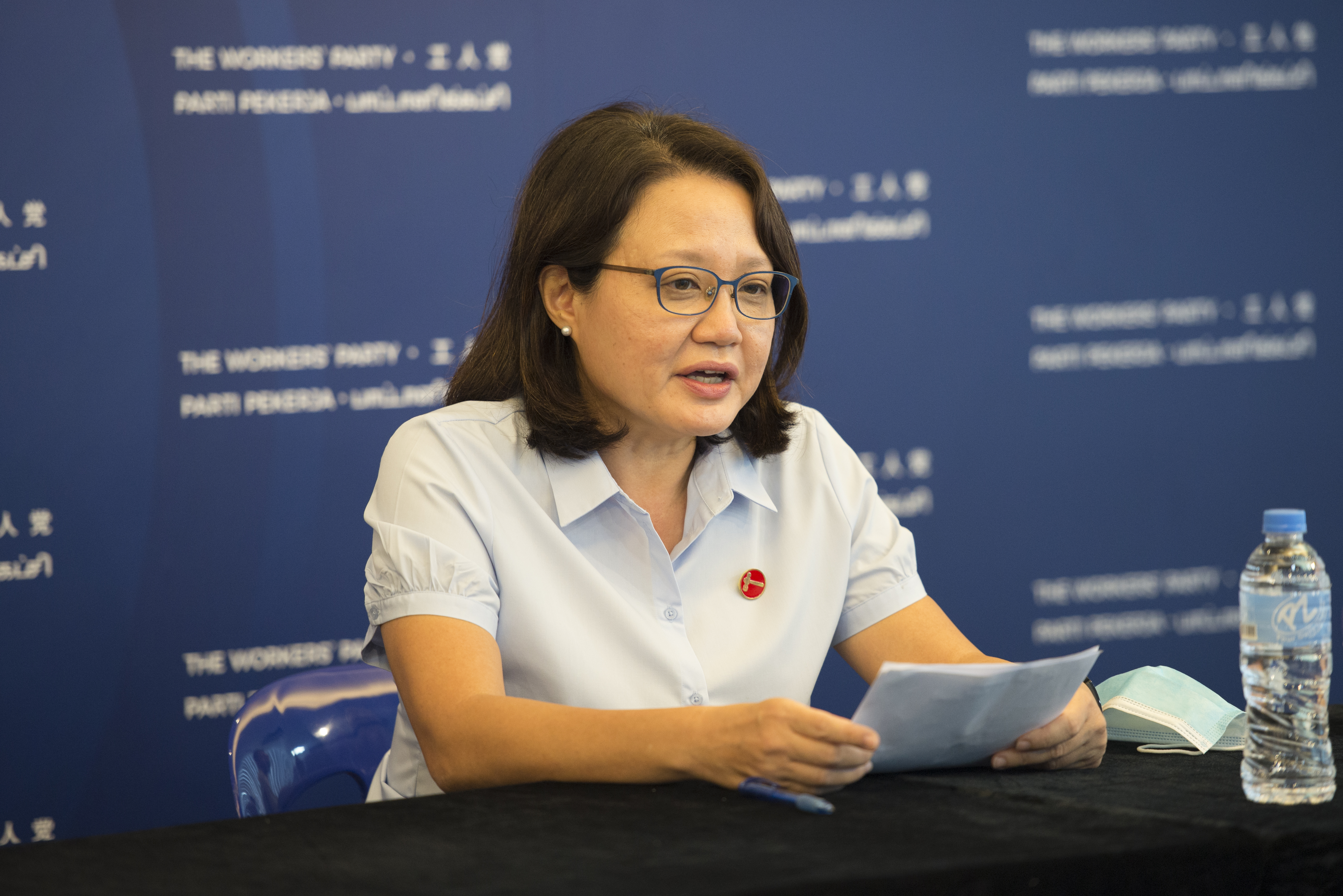
Lim at a press conference in 2020

=== 2006-11: First term as NCMP ===
Lim was cited as feeling "distressed" that opposition parties could contest only one-third of the parliamentary seats during the 2001 general election, especially when WP only contested two seats instead of seven after their proposed team to contest Aljunied GRC was disqualified during nomination day. Ten days after the election, she joined the Workers' Party (WP) and became the chairwoman of the party within 18 months in 2003, succeeding Tan Bin Seng. Lim made her debut in the 2006 general election where she led her WP team to contest Aljunied GRC, but lost to the incumbent PAP with 43.91% of the votes, which was the best-performing non-elected score in that election. After which, Lim became the Non-constituency Member of Parliament (NCMP).

During her term in Parliament, Lim spoke out against ministers' salaries, and also against means testing in hospitals, which resulted in the PAP deferring a decision on this for a period of two years from 2006 to 2008. In addition, she also called for a reduction in the Goods and Services Tax, arguing that it was a regressive tax, and urged the government to do more to help retrenched workers.

In 2009, Parliament debated the Human Organ Transplant (Amendment) Bill which would permit an organ donor to receive a reasonable amount of payment as a reimbursement for medical checks, insurance and other medical expenses, and loss of income. Lim spoke of her worry that the bill might lead to a backdoor organ trading and profiteering.

In 2010, Lim mooted the idea that the proportion of each Primary 1 cohort that would be seeking a university education should be increased beyond the 30% by 2015 that the Government was planning. She noted that in Organisation for Economic Co-operation and Development countries in 2006 about 37% of each age cohort received a degree-level education, and that a sizeable number of Singaporean students who failed to gain entry into local universities had done well in reputable universities overseas. She also suggested giving concessionary fares to disabled individuals who make up 2% of the adult population under 60 years.

Lim expressed concerns about a proposed constitutional amendment introduced in April 2010 that would allow magistrates to hear what are called "first mentions" through video conferencing. A first mention is a hearing that must be held within 48 hours of a person's arrest. She felt it failed to adequately assure accused people that they were allowed to complain to magistrates about injuries they had sustained or acts of misfeasance against them by the authorities. In response, Deputy Prime Minister and Minister for Home Affairs Wong Kan Seng assured MPs that processes would be in place to ensure that accused people are treated fairly. For example, during a video conference, an accused person would be alone in a room without police officers and able to see what was happening in the entire courtroom. Secondly, the screen used by the judge would be large enough to enable them to clearly see whether the accused was under duress. Finally, mistreated accused people could either complain to the police or to the judge when they were later present in court.

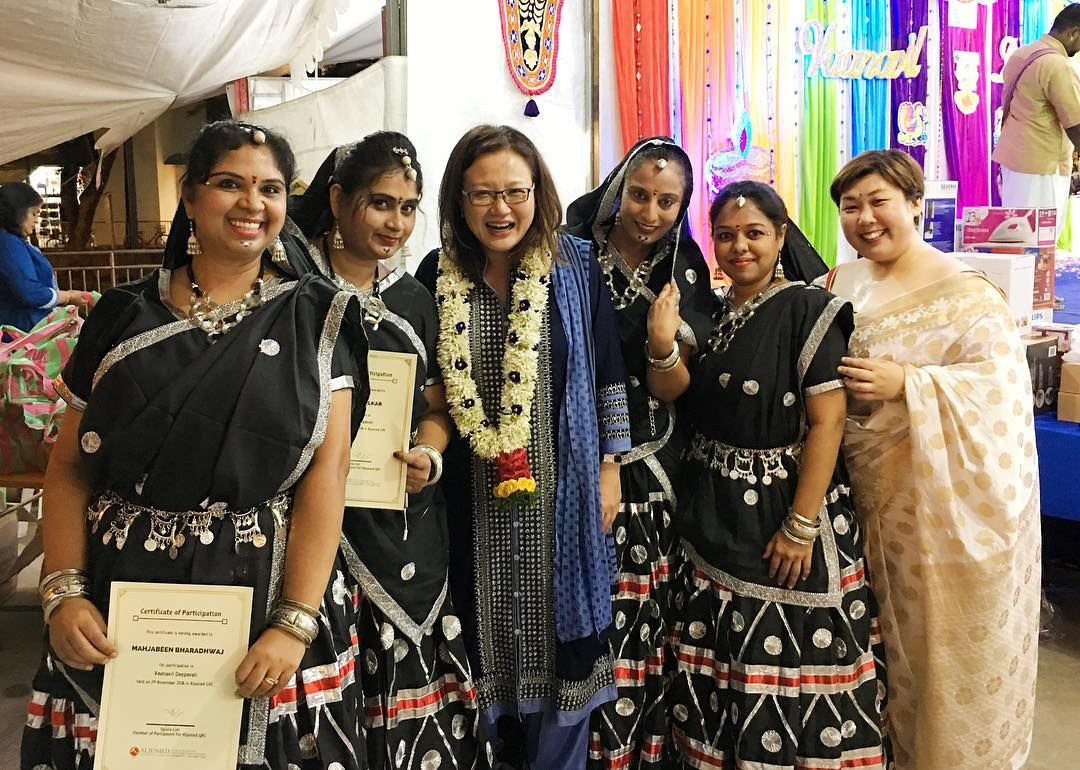
Lim at a cultural event

The following month, during parliamentary debates on major revisions to the Criminal Procedure Code, Lim suggested there was a need to improve pre-trial disclosure procedures and to ensure that victims of crimes received redress. Further, she expressed concerns over the leniency of community-based sentencing. The bill eventually incorporated several of her suggestions.

In 2011, Lim noted that the Compulsory Education Act ensures that all children have the opportunity to receive an education. However, she expressed concern that processes for entry to schools for children with special needs were cumbersome. Furthermore, education for children with special needs was not subject to the same subsidies that students in mainstream schools had. She thus brought to the House's attention the fact that special needs children might have been unintentionally marginalized. These concerns were supported by Penny Low, MP for Pasir Ris–Punggol GRC.

=== 2011 general election: first term as MP ===
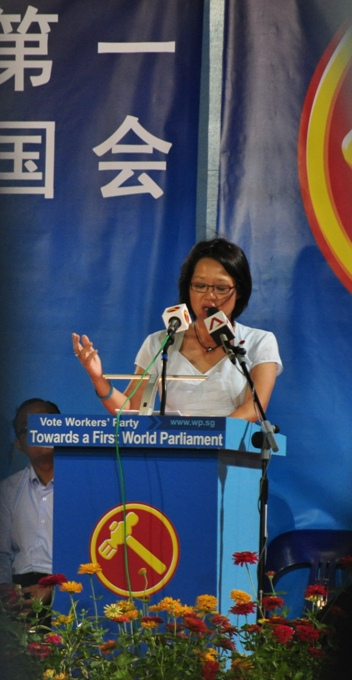
Sylvia Lim speaking at Bedok Stadium during the 2011 Singaporean general election campaign.

We are doing this because we believe that your lives will improve if the PAP government faces a strong Workers' Party (WP) presence in Parliament. We promise to serve you to the best of our abilities. We trust your judgement; you are our secret weapon.

— Sylvia Lim, on her nomination day acceptance speech.

In the 2011 general election, Lim again contested in Aljunied GRC along with his leader Low Thia Khiang and three new candidates including Low's successor Pritam Singh. Her party campaigned on the slogan "Towards a First World Parliament", which entailed maintaining checks and balances in Parliament to keep the ruling party accountable to the public, and for opposition parties to gain experience in policy formulation and constituency work; Lim also told during her nomination day acceptance speech that the party will trust Aljunied GRC's judgement as a "secret weapon". In her final election rally speech, Lim emphasized that contrary to the public's perception, there was "no glamour" in being an opposition MP, and that she was only "fighting to serve". In a televised political broadcast on cooling-off day, Lim warned the public that "there is a very real danger of an 87 to nil score ... and if that happens, Singapore's political landscape will suffer a tremendous setback from which we may never recover."

The ensuing polling day on 7 May was noted for being historic as Lim was returned to Parliament when their Aljunied GRC team won with 54.72% of the votes cast, marking the first instance where an opposition party claimed a group representation constituency, and Lim becoming the first female opposition MP-elect as well as the first former NCMP to do so. After the election, she was assigned to look after the Paya Lebar ward and appointed chairperson of the combined Aljunied–Hougang Town Council.

==== Gross National Happiness ====
In her maiden speech as an opposition MP in October 2011, Lim urged the government to adopt a more holistic approach in assessing the well-being of Singaporeans, which included using Gross National Happiness (GNH) as an indicator apart from conventional indicators such as the Gross Domestic Product (GDP). Lim further noted in her speech that Singapore was a co-sponsor of Bhutan's resolution in the United Nations entitled Happiness: Towards a holistic approach to development. Lim's speech drew swift rebuttals from MPs of the ruling People's Action Party, including Prime Minister Lee Hsien Loong who suggested later in 2014 that it was impractical "to switch to a different metric – from GDP to GNH". Lim replied that "the search for alternative indicators other than GDP is highly relevant ... GNH is not merely about measuring an emotion. It is about measuring societal progress in a holistic way".

==== Woffles Wu case ====
In 2012, Lim engaged in a heated debate with Law Minister K Shanmugam where she questioned if the judgement published by the Attorney-General's Chambers (AGC) with regards to the Woffles Wu speeding case had addressed public concerns on the equitability of Singapore's legal system. Wu was fined S$1,000 in June 2012 under section 81(3) of the Road Traffic Act. Lim questioned why a custodial sentence was not imposed, noting that "aggravating factors" such as Wu abetting someone to provide false information to the police, and that he had committed more than one offence over a prolonged period would have warranted a harsher sentence. Shanmugam insisted that the treatment of the law applied in Wu's case was in line with prior cases of a similar nature, and challenged Lim repeatedly to name "a single case" in which a custodial sentence was imposed on cases with such a nature.

The sharp exchange between Lim and the Minister led to WP chief Low Thia Khiang intervening to question if Shanmugam was trying to "impose some sort of intimidation" on Lim. The debate also led to Lim requesting the Minister to "confirm whether he's questioning my motive in filing the question? ... Is he alleging bad faith on my part to cast aspersions on the legal system?", to which Shanmugam replied, "MPs should leave politics aside and look at the facts if we want to be honest and fair. It's got nothing to do with intimidation."

==== Population White Paper ====
Lim also spoke out against the Population White Paper, contending that the government's strategy of using immigration to "top up" for the shortfall in Singapore's total fertility rate (TFR) would "further dilute national identity" and place Singapore on course in requiring "even more population injections in the future". She added that the government's attempts to encourage childbirths had been "half-hearted". Lim and her party proposed a greater tradeoff between GDP growth and population numbers, as well as new initiatives to encourage TFR recovery.

==== Action Information Management (AIM) saga ====
The AIM saga, which involved the termination of town council IT software owned by the PAP in the event of a "material change" in the leadership of a town, became a much talked about issue in the lead up to the Punggol East by-election in 2013. Lim contended that a "material change" was taken to mean a "change in political leadership" as in Aljunied GRC, and questioned how the public interest was served with the presence of such a termination clause. This led to Lim filing an adjournment motion in Parliament titled Safeguarding the Public Interest in Town Council Management, which she withdrew after the government announced that it would conduct a review on the issue. Minister for National Development Khaw Boon Wan accused Lim of being "self-righteous" and "arrogant", to which Lim replied, "I definitely do not accept his ascription of those motives to me personally". Outside the saga, she also campaigned in that by-election for feminism to vote for Lee Li Lian, the eventual MP-elect.

==== Little India riot ====
Lim opposed the Public Order (Additional Temporary Measures) Bill in the aftermath of the 2013 Little India riot, characterising the "hasty introduction" of the bill as a "knee-jerk reaction" by the government. She noted that the bill would in effect "stigmatise Little India as a special zone requiring special legislation" and that "there are already sufficient powers under our laws" with the Committee of Inquiry (COI) set to release its recommendations soon. Lim further expressed concerns with regards to newly imposed liquor control regulations, as well as policing resources and manpower required to handle such occurrences.

==== Promoting social mobility ====
Lim also advocated for a more progressive tax system and strengthening of social safety nets to mitigate inequality, which included tweaking the income tax tiers for high income earners and fixing loopholes in the property tax measures.

Lim expressed support for the Pioneer Generation Package rolled out by the government in 2014, but raised concerns with regards to the MediShield Life scheme, particularly for Singaporeans who are already on private medical insurance or those living abroad.

=== Second term: 2015 general election ===
Less than a month before election day on 12 August 2015, Lim set up her Instagram account with the first post showing a photo of herself eating oyster omelette at Fengshan Hawker Centre. The accompanying caption read "The taste of Fengshan – heavenly!" and a cryptic hashtag "#ReasonsToWin". A media frenzy and large public reaction ensued, with rumours circulating that Lim was considering a move to contest the election in Fengshan SMC. Alluding to the financial problems of the WP-run Aljunied–Hougang-Punggol East Town Council, Deputy Prime Minister Teo Chee Hean entered the reaction, criticising Lim for wanting to "swallow up Fengshan" and "help the town council with the deficit". Lim later replied that it was "unfortunate" that Teo "does not seem to have a sense of humour".

In the 2015 Singaporean general election, Lim defended her Aljunied GRC ward against a new PAP team led by Yeo Guat Kwang. Campaigning on the platform "Empower Your Future", the vote-counting became tight and a recount had to be conducted as the margin was less than 2%. Despite Lim (alongside Chen Show Mao's Serangoon division) lost to the PAP by hundreds of votes, the WP however won the other three divisions by thousands of the votes, resulting in WP returning Aljunied by a narrow 1.92% margin, or 2,626 votes.

Speaking to the media hours after the election results on the sidelines of a thank you parade, Lim questioned if "voters don't want too much opposition in Parliament". She added that the fact that all 89 seats were contested by the opposition might also have resulted in some pushback, where voters were worried "sooner or later the PAP might be dislodged as a government". The feel-good factor of the SG50 golden jubilee celebrations, memory of the late Lee Kuan Yew who died in the same year and the unstable economic environment were also some other factors Lim cited for the results swinging in favour of the ruling party.

Singapore's 13th Parliament opened on 25 January 2016 following the elections in 2015. In her Parliamentary speech to President Tony Tan Keng Yam's addenda, Lim called for fundamental changes to Singapore's education system and how students are assessed, as well as scaling back the government's presence in non-core government functions such as in the boards of sports groups so as to allow such organisations to "manage their own affairs". Lim further noted that "an exceptional nation should have a people whose DNA is being unafraid to fail".

==== Administration of Justice (Protection) Bill ====
In a sharp exchange with Law Minister K Shanmugam which lasted seven hours, Lim and her party colleagues voiced strong objections to the Administration of Justice (Protection) Bill which deals with the law of contempt of court. Lim argued that the bill was "being bulldozed through Parliament" and "unnecessarily lower[s] the threshold to what amounts to scandalising the courts". She added that the bill provides "draconian enforcement muscle" to the government, with the Minister using "a sledgehammer to kill an ant ... we are one step closer to being a police state". Lim ended her speech as such,

By all means, uphold respect for the administration of justice. But laws which protect the ruling elites at the expense of ordinary Singaporeans have no place in this House.

— Sylvia Lim

==== Government Proceedings Act ====
While Lim supported the Government Proceedings Act, she argued against one of the act's clauses which removes the limit to the amount of legal fees the government can be awarded if and when it goes to court. Lim expressed "grave concerns" about the bill, saying that the bill will give the public the impression that the government is "using legal costs as a deterrent or prohibitive factor when it comes to litigation with the government".

==== Oxley Road dispute ====
Speaking during the 2-day special Parliamentary session on the 38 Oxley Road dispute, Lim noted that allegations of abuse of power mounted on PM Lee Hsien Loong by his siblings Lee Hsien Yang and Dr Lee Wei Ling were "serious charges" and "deeply troubling". Focusing her speech on potential conflicts of interest, Lim revealed that Singapore's current Attorney-General (AG) Lucien Wong represented the PM as his personal lawyer in the dispute involving the house. The Deputy AG, Hri Kumar, was also an ex-PAP MP. Lim questioned if the leadership of the Attorney-General's Chambers had "recused themselves in advising the Government on any decision it wishes to take on 38 Oxley Road", and "whether these appointments instill public confidence that the AGC will act independently in matters where the Government or Prime Minister has an interest in the outcomes". In an ensuing debate with Senior Minister of State for Law Indranee Rajah, Lim further questioned if the Cabinet agrees that there should be "distance between the Government and the AGC leadership", to which Rajah disagreed and replied that "independence of mind" was the crucial factor.

==== Debate on Presidential Elections Act (Amendment) Bill 2017 ====
Lim has opposed the elected presidency, advocating for the president to be an appointed one instead. Lim argued that a president "elected under a PAP government might be pro-PAP and could potentially cripple a non-PAP government in its first term". In a debate with Law Minister K Shanmugam in November 2016, Lim also disagreed on the "dual role" expected of the elected president – being a custodian of reserves as well as being a head of state – as this might lead to the president being faced with a confrontational situation with the government.

Lim has suggested since 2006 that a reversion back to the system where the president is appointed by Parliament would "naturally take care of any concerns of minority representation and would not be regressive". Lim further called for a national referendum for Singaporeans to decide whether the public preferred an elected or appointed president. Lim therefore voted against the constitutional amendments on the Presidential Elections Act in February 2017, which would provide for a reserved election if and when an individual from a minority race has not been president for five consecutive terms. She took issue with the government's decision to use Wee Kim Wee's presidential term as the basis of starting the count for the hiatus triggered mechanism, arguing that Wee was never elected by the people.

I have been reflecting on the decision to use President Wee as the reference point. I realised that this decision to count from President Wee was not a matter of getting legal advice to interpret any existing laws. If one looks at this Bill and the Schedule, the government is asking Parliament to simply make it the law that President Wee is the first one to be counted.

Why not count from the first elected President, Mr Ong Teng Cheong? Is it because if President Ong was the first one to be counted, we would have to go through this year’s elections as an open election, and risk a contest by Chinese or Indian candidates who may not be to the government’s liking? Isn’t the decision to count from President Wee an arbitrary and deliberate decision of the government, to achieve a desired outcome?

— Sylvia Lim

Alluding to Lim's accusations, Minister Chan Chun Sing charged that Lim was "casting aspersions on the integrity of the Prime Minister", while DPM Teo Chee Hean said the decision was "based on AGC's advice" and asked Lim to mount a judicial challenge in the courts if she disagreed. This subsequently led to former presidential candidate and ex-PAP MP Tan Cheng Bock filing a suit in the High Court on whether the government's decision to start the count from President Wee was correct and in accordance with the constitution. Tan's case was dismissed and thrown out by the High Court and Court of Appeal, with the court ruling that it was entirely up to the government to decide when to start the count for the hiatus triggered mechanism. Lim was present in the Court of Appeal to hear the judgement.

The writ of election for Presidential Elections 2017 was issued soon after on 28 August 2017. On the same day, Lim filed an adjournment motion titled "Counting from President Wee Kim Wee or President Ong Teng Cheong – policy decision or legal question?" for the parliamentary sitting on 11 September 2017. Her adjournment motion was subsequently balloted out twice as other PAP MPs had also filed adjournment motions, rendering her unable to speak on the issue.

Lim delivered her speech on the adjournment motion on 3 October 2017, after two unsuccessful attempts. In a strongly-worded 18-minute speech, Lim stated on the outset that the "public was very divided" on the implementation of reserved presidential elections. She accused the government — particularly PM Lee, DPM Teo, and Minister Chan — of attempting to "confuse and distract", and misleading Parliament by "merely using the AGC's advice as a cover to avoid full Parliamentary debate on why the count was not starting from President Ong Teng Cheong". In his reply, Law Minister Shanmugam rejected Lim's assertions that the government was attempting to mislead, saying that the "government has always been clear that when it comes to the counting, it is a policy matter for Parliament to decide". He also took a swipe at Lim and berated, "Ms Lim protests far too much."

==== Criminal Law (Temporary Provisions) Act ====
In opposing the renewal of the Criminal Law (Temporary Provisions) Act (CLTPA) on 6 February 2018, Lim questioned the premature renewal of the bill and said that the government had "gone too far" with the additional provisions, charging that the addition of a finality clause in the act to make the Minister's decision on whether to detain someone without trial final was an “attempt to make the Minister (for Home Affairs) all-powerful”. Lim added that she found the addition of the finality clause "very troubling" and "a position too arrogant for the House to adopt".

Lim also took issue with the amendments to the fourth schedule, which now defines the scope of criminal activities in which one may be detained under the CLTPA. Lim branded the bill "untenable" and accused the Minister of attempting to be "a global policeman with no equal in the world" after it was revealed that individuals who commit criminal activities outside Singapore may now be detained under the CLTPA as well, as in the case of Dan Tan.

A highly charged exchange between Lim and Minister Shanmugam broke out thereafter, with the Minister rebutting to say he was "prepared to stand up here and say as the Law and Home Affairs Minister that there is no intention to oust judicial review". Shanmugam described Lim's use of the phrase "global policeman" as "rhetorical flourish", and further accused Lim of making speeches that "made for a good reading on her website" but were purely "theatrics with no substance, calculated to mislead".

If what the Minister is saying is correct – that the clause is not meant to change anything – then why introduce it at all? Why not leave it at status quo, instead of causing confusion and possible problems down the road about what this (finality) clause is meant to cover?

— Sylvia Lim

Lim rose to ask that a division be recorded at the second and third readings of the Bill. The bill to amend the act was ultimately passed with 77 ayes, 10 noes and 2 abstentions after a 4-hour debate. Eight of the WP elected MPs and NCMPs, as well as NMPs Kok Heng Leun and Azmoon Ahmad voted against the renewal of the CLTPA.

==== Budget 2018 ====
Addressing Parliament on the second day of the Financial Budget debate on 28 February 2018, Lim focused her speech on addressing social and economic inequality and how it posed a threat to Singapore's solidarity. Lim also questioned if the Government had commissioned independent studies on social mobility using longitudinal data.

Many of our lower-income residents work hard and even (hold) two jobs, but may still be unable to pay their bills ... Does our education system penalise those who did not have a leg up in pre-school? Do housing policies unjustly discriminate against those whose marriages failed? How have children been impacted by their parents' circumstances and were they supported or facilitated to break out of the poverty trap?

— Sylvia Lim

On 1 March 2018, Lim also pointed out that the Government had earlier floated "test balloons" on a possible GST hike but the public noted a contradiction with Deputy Prime Minister Tharman Shanmugaratnam's earlier statements that the Government already had enough money for the decade. This was, in Lim's view, a possible factor that led to the tax hike of two percentage points to 9% taking place only sometime between 2021 and 2025 instead of immediately. She said, "I rather suspect myself that the Government is stuck with that announcement otherwise... perhaps we would be debating a GST hike today."

Law Minister K Shanmugam and Finance Minister Heng Swee Keat rejected Lim's suspicion and demanded that Lim withdraw her statements. In particular, Shanmugam said that Lim had implied that the government was being dishonest by backing down on its plans, which was a "thoroughly hypocritical and dishonest statement typical of the statements she makes in this House".

In a fiery exchange which saw Shanmugam and Lim responding and talk over each other, Lim refused to retract her statements and defended her views as her "honest suspicion". Lim fired back, "The Government can rebut our speeches robustly, that's fine, but I don't think I'm disentitled to come to Parliament to advance honestly held beliefs or suspicions". The debate got so heated that Speaker Tan Chuan-Jin had to interject and remind MPs to respond only when their names were called.

Many online commentators on Channel NewsAsia's Facebook page, citing the presence of parliamentary privilege and the fact that it was an elected MP's duty to voice out the concerns of the public, were largely unconvinced by Shanmugam's accusations and saw no issue with Lim's statement. They also pointed out that Shanmugam seemed to have a personal discontent with Lim, judging from the numerous occasions in which both had clashed in Parliament. Lim highlighted this in Parliament in a statement during clarification time, “I can understand why he wants to accuse me of various things because he probably was not happy about past debates where I had disagreed with some of his legislative changes and in typical fashion, he always accuses me of dishonesty when as far as I am concerned I’ve acted honestly.”

The debate continued into the following day, with Heng demanding that Lim apologise to the House "as an honourable MP should" for her statements, and Shanmugam posting on Facebook with an edited video charging that Lim had "made serious, baseless insinuations".

Speaking at the start of the Parliamentary sitting on 6 March 2018, Leader of the House and Minister for Culture, Community and Youth Grace Fu demanded that Lim apologise to the House by 8 March 2018 and to withdraw her "allegation" that the Government had floated “test balloons” on the need to raise the GST. Fu had said Lim "cannot contend that her suspicion remains reasonable and honestly held" when clarification has been given to her by ministers in Parliament and elsewhere. Lim was not present in the chamber when Fu made her statement.

Lim responded to the issue in Parliament on 8 March 2018. In her 6-minute statement, Lim said she could accept her suspicion “may not have been correct”, but strongly rejected the government's accusation that her suspicion on the timing of the GST hike had no basis, and set out in detail a chronology of events including news reports and data published by economists which led to her to believe the GST might be raised in 2018. According to States Times Review, over 20 news reports of impending GST hike have been published by government-owned news media companies during the period of three months prior to Budget 2018 while the government ministries themselves maintained totally silent on the issue, thereby forming the basis of test balloons used in Lim's analogy. Lim reiterated that the public was worried about the impending GST hike, and she was not accusing the government of dishonesty.

Lim therefore stated that she was not going to offer any apology or retract any of her statements as she believed she was doing her “constitutional role” as an elected MP to “convey ground concerns, reactions and confusion".

In an ensuing robust exchange, Fu expressed “disappointment” and condemned Lim for her “low standards, lack of integrity … dishonourable and deplorable conduct” and threatened to refer the matter to the Committee of Privileges should Lim repeat statements of such a nature. Lim rose again to respond strongly against Fu's charges by quoting a part of Prime Minister Lee's closing speech during the 38 Oxley Road saga, "If MPs believe that something is wrong, it's MPs' job to pursue the facts and make these allegations in their own name, decide whether something seems to be wrong. And if you think something is wrong, even if you're not fully sure, then come to this House, confront the Government, ask for explanations and answers." Lim requested Fu to clarify if there was a “difference in standard here – One standard when the PM’s name needs to be cleared, and another standard when we are talking about raising taxes on the people?”

Finance Minister Heng pressed Lim for the “basis for her suspicions”. Lim responded by taking a dig at Heng, "I don’t think the Finance Minister was listening to my speech."

After the parliamentary debate having ended, various members of the PAP leadership continued to criticised Lim. Indranee Rajah took to Facebook to describe Lim's conduct as "not honourable", while Chee Hong Tat wrote in a letter on PAP's website alleging that Lim would use the GST hike issue to attack the ruling party in the next general election. The continued attacks on Lim, however, were met with much public criticism and cynicism on the "small-mindedness" of Singapore's leaders. It was also revealed that the PAP government had sought the AGC's advice on whether Lim had breached parliamentary privilege after failing to get her to retract her statement and apologise.

Former PAP MP Tan Cheng Bock also weighed in on the issue, voicing out on how the ministers were "brow-beating" Lim to extract an apology from her. He said, "Instead of getting upset, the Ministers should be thankful Sylvia Lim gave them an opportunity to explain. If the government’s position is ‘no’ then just say no and let's just stop at that. No need to get defensive." The debate led to numerous Singaporeans creating satire and coming up with various ridiculous reasons for one’s demand of an apology.

==== Appeal to High Court of Singapore ====
On 3 October 2018, a S$33.7 million trial was initiated between AHTC and the defendants of Low, Lim, Singh, and two other town councillors. The trial went on until 25 October; running out of funds due to the payments to the lawyers prior to the trial, Low launched a fundraiser to fund their appeal.

On 11 October 2019, the High Court of Singapore found WP members and their AHTC town councillors, and FMSS, guilty for breaching their duties and were liable for damages, citing that their leaders had "put political interests above that" of AHTC and residents. On 5 November, WP began its appeal into the case; in 2023, the court of appeal reversed the high court's judgement in favour of the WP team and awarded them the costs.

=== 2020-present: Aljunied entrenched as safe seat general election; closure of AHTC saga ===
Lim and her Aljunied GRC team which consist of Pritam Singh, Faisal Manap, Gerald Giam and Leon Perera won the ensuing re-elections in the 2020 Singaporean general election around 59% of the votes.

Lim and her Aljunied GRC team which consist of Pritam Singh, Gerald Giam, Kenneth Tiong and Fadli Fawzi won the ensuing re-elections in the 2025 Singaporean general election with around 59% of the votes from the PAP.

== Current appointments ==
Lim's current appointments are as follows:

- Chairman, Workers' Party (Singapore)
- Co-Chairman, Aljunied Constituency Committee (AJCC)

== Personal life ==
Lim's father, Lim Choon Mong, worked in the police force before quitting to study law in London and qualified as a practicing lawyer at age 39. In an interview with The Straits Times in 2013, Lim said much of her early political education were received in large part from her father. Her father died in August 2017. Lim's mother was a nurse.

Lim is a Catholic. While speaking at the CANA Catholic Centre Talk of the Town event in 2014, Lim said she tries "to read the Bible everyday" but prefers to keep her faith private, adding that it was "not my nature to evangelise" as others could already have had their own religion which they took comfort in.

Lim has been in a relationship with former national football player Quah Kim Song since 2013. The couple married on 4 January 2025.

== Notes ==
Parliament of Singapore
Preceded by Steve Chia	Non-Constituency Member of Parliament; 2006–2011	Succeeded by Lina Chiam; Yee Jenn Jong; Gerald Giam
Preceded by Yeo Guat Kwang; George Yeo; Zainul Abidin; Cynthia Phua; Lim Hwee Hua	Member of Parliament for Aljunied GRC; 2011–present Served alongside: (2011 - 2015): Low Thia Khiang, Pritam Singh, Faisal Manap, Chen Show Mao (2015 - 2020): Low Thia Khiang, Pritam Singh, Faisal Manap, Chen Show Mao (2020 - 2025): Gerald Giam, Pritam Singh, Faisal Manap, Leon Perera (2025 - present): Gerald Giam, Pritam Singh, Kenneth Tiong, Fadli Fawzi	Incumbent
Party political offices
Preceded by Tan Bin Seng	Chair of the Workers' Party; 2003–present	Incumbent
