= Pritam Singh =

Singaporean politician

The Honourable Pritam Singh
- ਪ੍ਰੀਤਮ ਸਿੰਘ
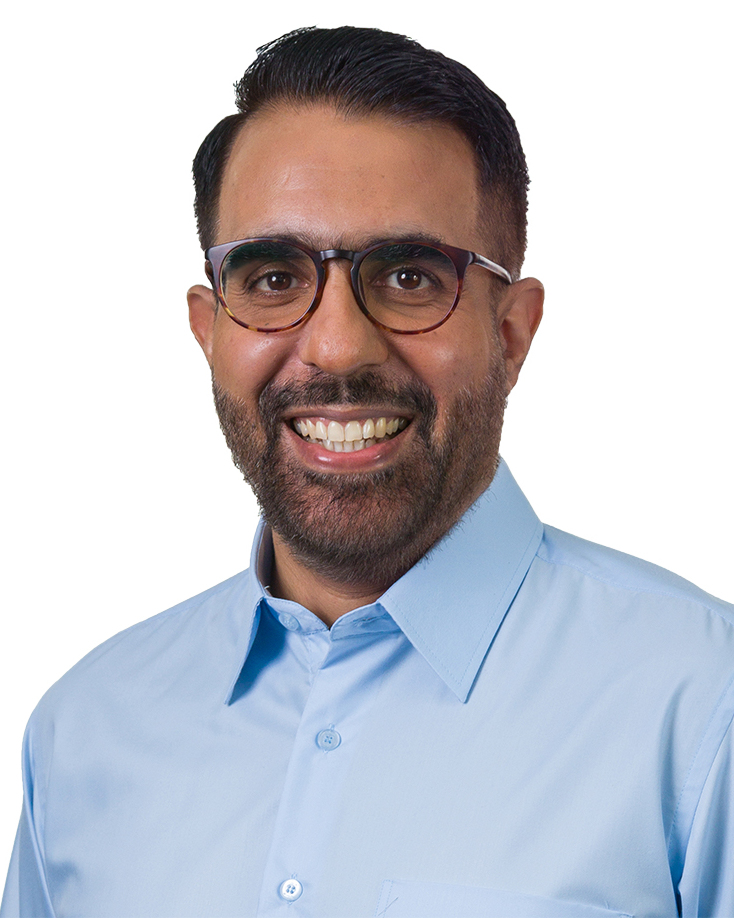
- Official portrait, 2021

9th Leader of the Opposition (Note: De jure: 24 August 2020 – 15 January 2026. The office was formally established in 2020; previous designations were unofficial and did not carry parliamentary privileges. Removed on 15 January 2026 as de jure Leader of Opposition but remained as de facto Leader of Opposition like predecessors.)
- Incumbent
- Assumed office 8 April 2018
- Prime Minister: Lee Hsien Loong; Lawrence Wong
- Preceded by: Low Thia Khiang

8th Secretary-General of the Workers' Party
- Incumbent
- Assumed office 8 April 2018
- Chairwoman: Sylvia Lim
- Vice-Chairman: Faisal Manap
- Preceded by: Low Thia Khiang

Member of Parliament for Aljunied GRC
- Incumbent
- Assumed office 7 May 2011
- Preceded by: PAP held
- Majority: 2011: 12,460 (9.44%); 2015: 2,626 (1.92%); 2020: 28,485 (19.90%); 2025: 25,783 (19.42%)

Personal details
- Born: 2 August 1976 (age 50) Singapore
- Party: Workers' Party
- Spouse: Lovleen Kaur Walia (m. 2012)
- Children: 2
- Education: National University of Singapore (BA); King's College London (MA); Singapore Management University (JD)
- Occupation: Politician; author

Military service
- Branch/service: Singapore Army
- Years of service: 1994–2002
- Rank: Major

Pritam Singh (Note: Punjabi: ਪ੍ਰੀਤਮ ਸਿੰਘ, romanised: Prītam Siṅgh) (born 2 August 1976) is a Singaporean politician, author and former lawyer who was the leader of the opposition from 2020 to 2026. He has been the secretary-general of the Workers' Party (WP) since 2018 and the Member of Parliament (MP) for the Eunos division of Aljunied Group Representation Constituency (GRC) since 2011. Singh was the first de jure leader of the opposition in post-independence Singapore.

Singh won the Straits Steamship Prize in 1999 for being the top undergraduate student in history and political science and graduated from the National University of Singapore in 2000 with a Bachelor of Arts degree in history. He went on to pursue postgraduate studies at King's College London on a Chevening Scholarship, earning a Master of Arts degree in war studies in 2004. Singh subsequently returned to Singapore and enrolled in the Juris Doctor programme at the Singapore Management University, completing his legal studies and being called to the bar in 2011. In 2013, he joined the litigation and dispute resolution department of Donaldson & Burkinshaw, Singapore’s oldest law firm.

Singh joined the WP in 2010. He made his political debut, and won, in Aljunied GRC at the 2011 general election, defeating the governing People's Action Party (PAP) in the first GRC victory by the opposition. He succeeded Low Thia Khiang as secretary-general of the WP on 8 April 2018 as part of a leadership transition. Between then and 2020, Singh functioned as the de facto leader of the opposition. Following the party’s performance in the 2020 general election, where it won the newly created Sengkang GRC while retaining Hougang Single Member Constituency (SMC) and Aljunied GRC, Singh was formally appointed by prime minister Lee Hsien Loong as the first de jure leader of the opposition and thus granted additional parliamentary responsibilities and resources. In January 2026, Prime Minister Lawrence Wong removed Singh as Leader of the Opposition following a parliamentary motion after his two counts of perjury of giving false testimony to a parliamentary committee. Singh remained secretary-general of the Workers' Party and was retained by party cadres in a supermajority vote in June 2026. In August 2026, he was disbarred by the Court of Three Judges for lying to Parliament.

== Early life and education ==
Singh was born on 2 August 1976 in Singapore. He is the younger of two children. His father served as a district judge and had earlier held a commission as a military officer. Singh attended Woodsville Primary School, Belvedere Primary School and Saint Thomas Secondary School (all now-defunct), where he studied in the Normal (Academic) stream. He subsequently enrolled at Jurong Junior College (current Jurong Pioneer Junior College) before being awarded the Singapore Armed Forces's Local Study Award to pursue undergraduate studies. He graduated from the National University of Singapore in 2000 with a Bachelor of Arts degree in history.

Following his undergraduate education, Singh pursued postgraduate studies at King's College London, where he obtained a Master of Arts degree in war studies in 2004 under the Chevening Scholarship. He later completed a diploma in Islamic studies from the International Islamic University Malaysia in 2005. The Straits Times reported that he pursued the diploma to better understand and discuss religious issues. In 2007, Singh co-founded Opinion Asia, an online syndicate that focused on analysis and commentary about Asian affairs and communities. He returned to Singapore to read law at the Singapore Management University, where he graduated with a Juris Doctor degree in 2011.

== Career ==
=== Military career ===
Singh enlisted in the Singapore Armed Forces in 1994 and served as a commissioned officer between 1996 and 2002. During his service, he was a combat engineer. At present, he is a reservist commander with the rank of Major.

=== Legal career ===
In 2013, Singh joined the litigation and dispute resolution practice at Donaldson & Burkinshaw, Singapore's oldest law firm.

In March 2026, the Law Society of Singapore initiated disciplinary proceedings against Singh after he was convicted of lying to Parliament. On 31 July of the same year, a notice from the High Court stated that the Society was seeking to disbar him over the conviction. On 13 August, Singh was struck off rolls over the conviction by the Court of Three Judges.

== Political career ==
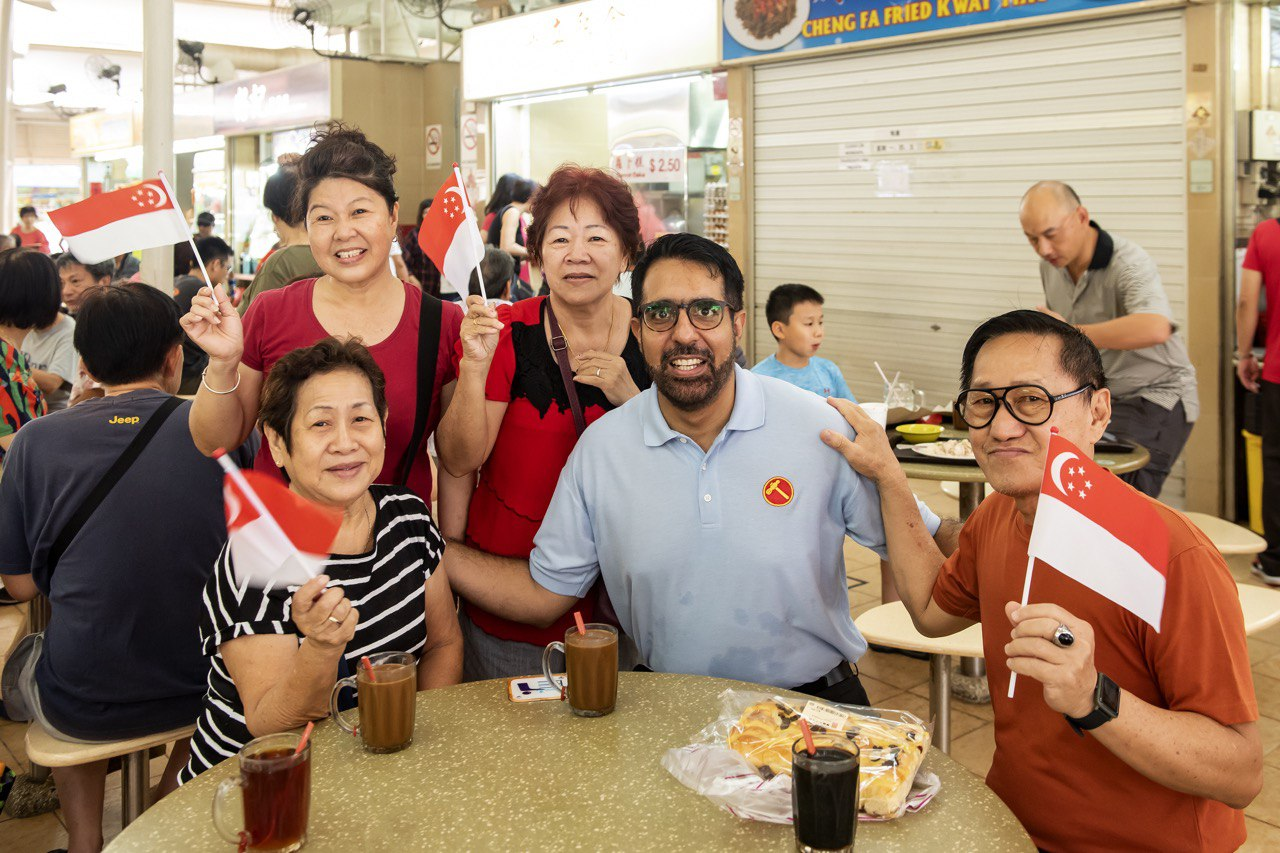
Singh posing with a family at a hawker centre in 2021

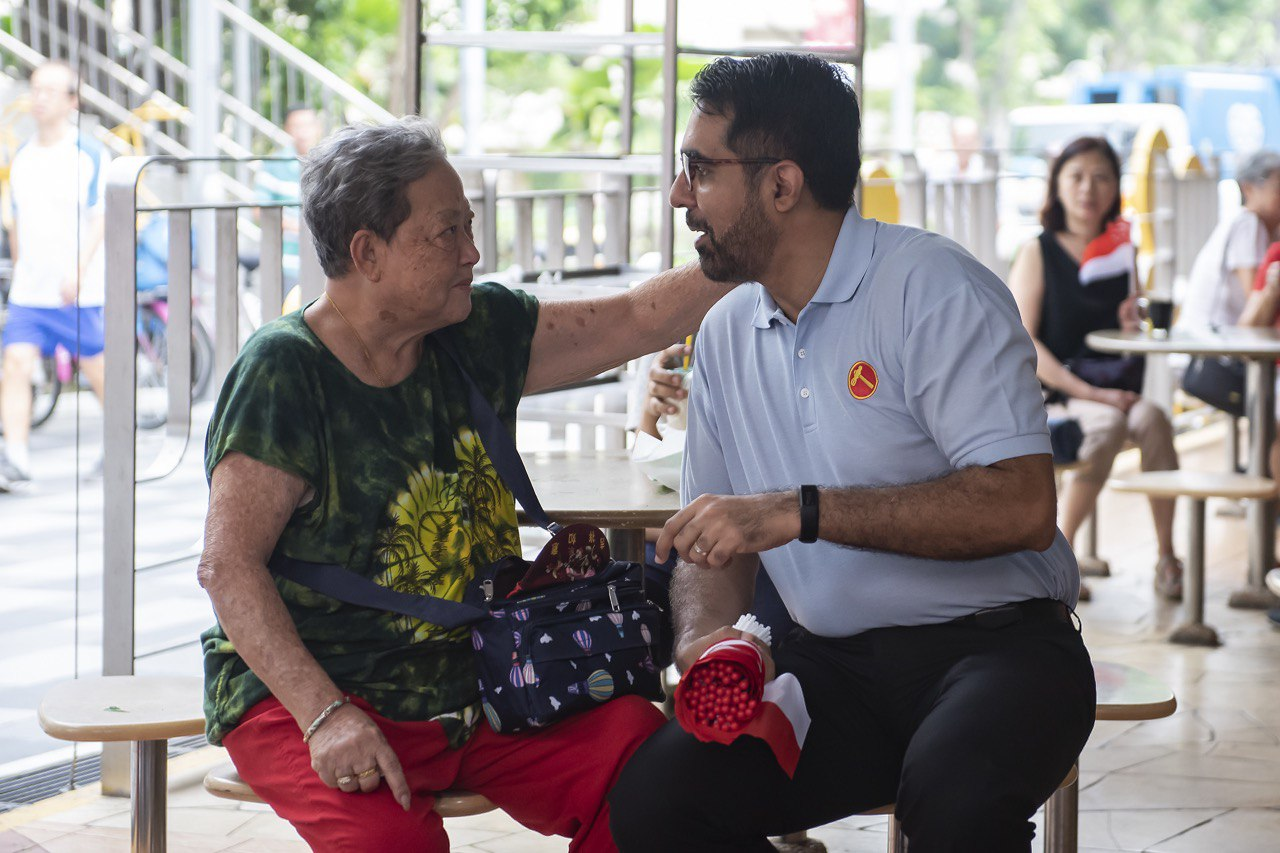
Singh with an elderly constituent in 2021

Singh joined the WP around 2010 while completing a juris doctor degree at the Singapore Management University, citing its "level-headedness and leadership" as his primary motivator.

=== Parliamentary Debut ===
During the 2011 general election, Singh was part of the five-member WP team for Aljunied GRC, led by then secretary-general Low Thia Khiang, who earlier left his safe seat of Hougang SMC. The Aljunied GRC team at the time was led by Minister for Foreign Affairs George Yeo, and then-Eunos division MP Zainul Abidin, a Senior Minister of State. The WP team won 54.72% of the vote, marking the first opposition victory in GRCs since their creation in 1988. The party then held on to the constituency with a narrow margin of 2% in the subsequent election, with an election recount revealing that his division was one of three divisions that won the WP vote.

=== Leadership of the Workers' Party ===
In 2016, Singh was appointed as the assistant secretary general on the party's executive council. Singh was also previously the chairman of the Aljunied–Hougang Town Council (AHTC) from 2016 to 2020.

In 2017, after Low Thia Khiang announced that he was contemplating retirement as well as wanting to rejuvenate the party for "younger blood"; Singh was widely regarded to be the next chief of the Workers' Party before the next election. On 8 April 2018, Singh was succeeded by Low as the new WP's secretary-general.

=== 2020 general election ===
The 2020 general election was the first election under Singh's leadership, and also the first time his Aljunied GRC team does not include his predecessor Low, as he was under rehabilitation at the time, having being injured and hospitalized months prior.

Singh and his team which consist of Sylvia Lim, Faisal Manap, Gerald Giam and Leon Perera was re-elected with 59.95% of the votes. In addition of retaining their safe seat Hougang, WP also won the brand-new Sengkang GRC; this marked the first time that any opposition party claimed multiple GRCs at once, and also the first time an opposition won the overall popular contested vote, scoring 50.49%.

=== Committee of Privileges (COP) conviction ===
Following Raeesah Khan's admission in Parliament on 1 November 2021 that she had lied about a sexual assault case, the Committee of Privileges (COP) initiated an inquiry into the conduct of several WP leaders. On 10 February 2022, the COP recommended that Singh and Faisal Manap be referred to the Public Prosecutor to assess whether criminal proceedings were warranted for potentially providing false statements to the committee. Parliament voted on 15 February 2022 to endorse this recommendation. Two years later, on 19 March 2024, Singh was charged with two counts of giving false evidence to a parliamentary committee under Section 31(q) of the Parliament (Privileges, Immunities and Powers) Act 1962. He pleaded not guilty and opted to claim trial. Despite being charged, Singh retained his seat in Parliament, as the legal proceedings did not meet the constitutional thresholds for disqualification.

The trial at the District Court began on 14 October 2024. On 17 February 2025, Singh was found guilty on both charges and fined $7,000 for each count. After his conviction, he filed an appeal to the High Court. The conviction does not disqualify him from contesting elections or serving as an MP, as each fine falls below the disqualification threshold of $10,000 on a single charge stipulated under Article 45 of the Constitution (which was last revised on May 2022, where the threshold amount was previously set at $2,000). His appeal was heard by the High Court on 4 November 2025. The court dismissed his appeal on 4 December 2025. Later that month, 25 WP cadres requested a special conference to review Singh's leadership. In March 2026, the Law Society of Singapore initiated disciplinary proceedings against Singh in relation to the conviction. In April 2026, the Workers' Party Central Executive Committee issued Singh a formal letter of reprimand following an internal disciplinary process. At the special conference on 28 June 2026, party cadres voted to retain him as secretary-general with about 80% support.

=== 2025 general election ===
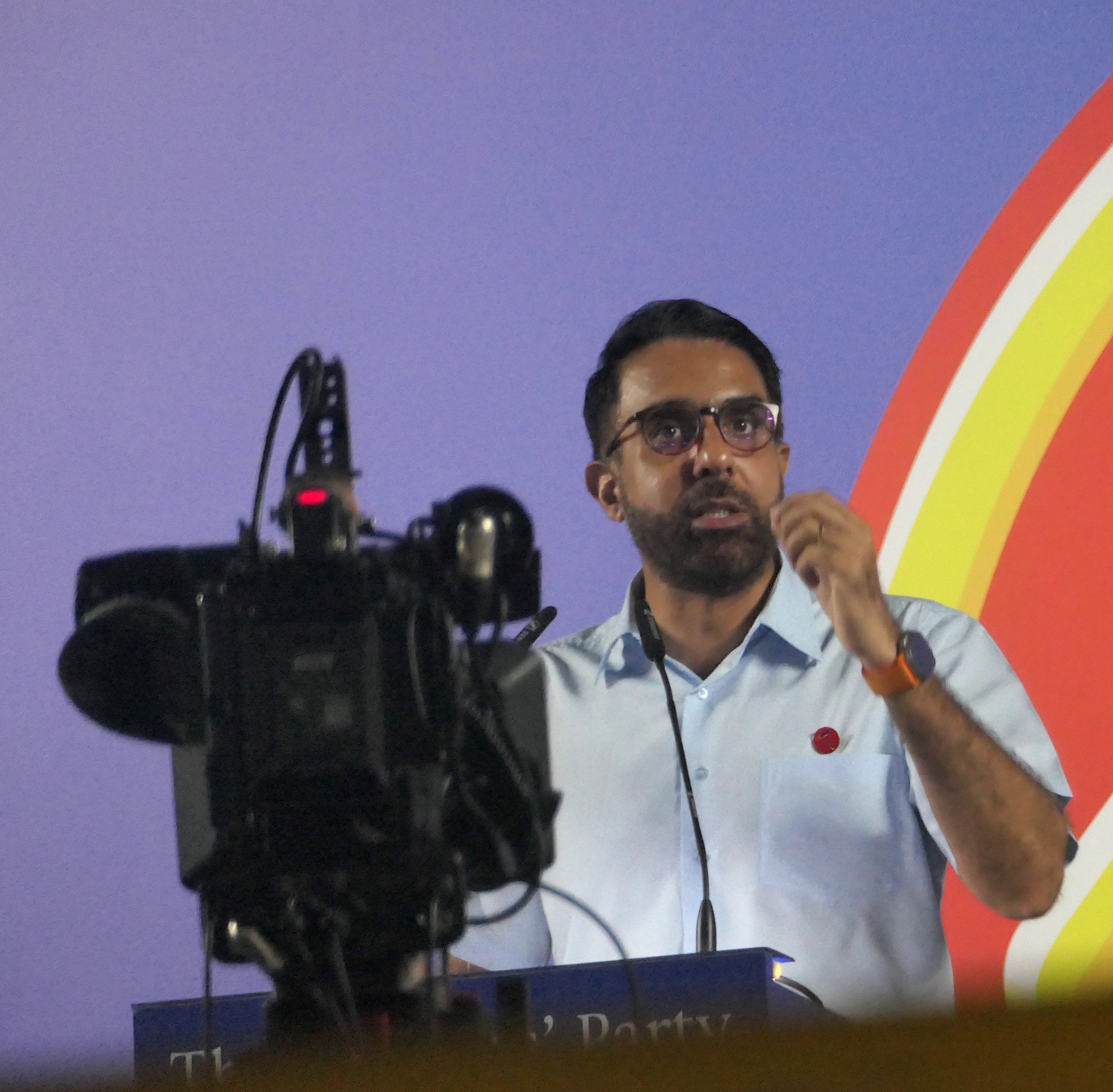
Singh campaigning in 2025

Despite the ongoing lawsuits, Singh was retained of the eligibility, allowing him to run in the 2025 election. Their Aljunied team consists of Sylvia Lim, Gerald Giam, Kenneth Tiong and Fadli Fawzi was re-elected for a fourth term with 59.71%, and managed to successful hold on to their current seats of Hougang SMC and Sengkang GRC.

During the campaigning period, Singh was criticized by most of the opposition parties, notably the People's Power Party leader Goh Meng Seng, for the walkover of Marine Parade-Braddell Heights GRC and the decision to contest Tampines GRC for a four-cornered contest, a first for the party. Singh rebutted the criticisms properly, citing logistics and planning reasons.

== Leader of the opposition (2020–2026) ==
Following the 2020 general election, in which the WP won ten seats in Parliament, Prime Minister Lee Hsien Loong announced Singh's formal designation as Leader of the Opposition. This was the first formal establishment of the office in Singapore, and the designation included additional staff and parliamentary resources.

The office carried an annual salary of S$385,000, twice that of an ordinary Member of Parliament. Singh said that he would donate half of the salary increase to party activities, charitable causes and constituency needs.

As leader of the opposition, Singh also began to take on a more pronounced policy advocacy role within Parliament. In October 2020, he called for the introduction of a universal monthly minimum wage of S$1,300 to replace the existing progressive wage model, arguing that a uniform wage floor would better uphold the dignity of low-income workers and address income inequality more effectively. In February 2023, Singh further proposed that an English language proficiency requirement be introduced for applicants seeking Singaporean citizenship or permanent residency, contending that it would aid integration and align with the country's linguistic and civic norms.

During the 2025 Budget debate, Singh criticised the government's decision to proceed with increases in the Goods and Services Tax during a period of inflation and renewed his call for an independent parliamentary budget office.

=== Media appearance ===
In 2025, during his first podcast appearance on Keluar Sekejap with Malaysian politicians Khairy Jamaluddin and Shahril Hamdan, Singh said that the WP aimed to be ready to govern should the PAP suffer a "serious failure", calling it a form of "political insurance" for Singapore. He stressed that he did not aspire to be Prime Minister, but instead sought to "normalise the idea of an opposition" and grow the party in line with the "pragmatic outlook of Singaporean voters", additionally saying that the WP aimed to stay "relatable and effective" within the incumbent political context of Singapore.

Several days after the podcast was released, the PAP criticised Singh for discussing Singaporean politics on a foreign platform, questioning his choice to speak "on foreign soil to a foreign audience". In response, the WP called the interview "well received by Singaporeans" and of "no negative impact on Singapore's national interests". It stated that the Leader of the Opposition did not belong to the executive and was hence not subject to any known restriction on such engagements, while noting that PAP leaders regularly gave interviews to foreign media.

In a response, the PAP acknowledged that ministers often spoke to foreign outlets on a range of topics, but called it "unusual" that the Leader of the Opposition had given his first detailed interview after the election, centred on Singaporean domestic affairs, to Malaysian hosts. The PAP also criticised the WP for downplaying concerns over its links to Noor Deros, an Islamist preacher based in Kuala Lumpur who endorsed WP vice-chairperson Faisal Manap and his contest in Tampines GRC as well as public endorsements by politicians from the Malaysian Islamic Party (PAS). (Note: Malay: Parti Islam Se-Malaysia) It argued that these issues "raise[d] serious questions" about foreign influence in Singaporean politics and defence from it.

On 4 November 2025, Singh also appeared in a televised program The Assembly, hosted by CNA, making it the first time where an opposition MP make a televised presence. However, that episode was pulled out from rotation on 13 December as their episode was in contempt of court per the AGC, and both him and Mediacorp were issued warning letters and an apology.

=== Removal as Leader of the Opposition ===
On 14 January 2026, Parliament approved a motion introduced by Leader of the House Indranee Rajah stating that Singh was unsuitable to continue as leader of the opposition. The motion followed his conviction on two counts of giving false evidence to the COP and the dismissal of his appeal by the High Court. Singh maintained his innocence. The motion passed along party lines, with PAP and Nominated MPs in attendance voting in favour and WP MPs in attendance voting against. During the debate, Indranee said that the authority to appoint or remove the leader of the opposition rested with the Prime Minister. On 15 January 2026, Prime Minister Lawrence Wong removed Singh as leader of the opposition and invited the WP to nominate another elected opposition MP. The WP declined on 21 January, stating that the leader of the largest opposition party in Parliament was the leader of the opposition. The Prime Minister's Office subsequently said that the office would remain vacant until the WP nominated another MP.

== Personal life ==
Singh is of Indian ancestry and is a practising Sikh. He married Loveleen Kaur Walia, a Singaporean theatre practitioner, in 2012. The couple have two daughters.

Parliament of Singapore
Preceded by Low Thia Khiang	Leader of the Opposition; 2018–2026 (de jure: 2020–2026)	Vacant
Preceded by Yeo Guat Kwang; George Yeo; Zainul Abidin; Cynthia Phua; Lim Hwee Hua	Member of Parliament for Aljunied GRC; 2011–present Served alongside: (2011 - 2015): Low Thia Khiang, Sylvia Lim, Faisal Manap, Chen Show Mao (2015 - 2020): Low Thia Khiang, Sylvia Lim, Faisal Manap, Chen Show Mao (2020 - 2025): Gerald Giam, Sylvia Lim, Faisal Manap, Leon Perera (2025 - present): Gerald Giam, Sylvia Lim, Kenneth Tiong, Fadli Fawzi	Incumbent
Party political offices
Preceded by Low Thia Khiang	Secretary-General of the Workers' Party; 2018–present	Incumbent
