= Cynthia Phua =

Singaporean politician (born 1958)

- 潘惜玉

Member of Parliament for Aljunied GRC
- In office 25 October 2001 – 18 April 2011
- Preceded by: PAP held
- Succeeded by: WP gain

Personal details
- Born: Cynthia Phua Siok Gek; 19 August 1958 (age 68) Singapore
- Other political affiliations: People's Action Party (2001-2011)
- Education: National University of Singapore (BSc)
- Occupation: Politician

Cynthia Phua Siok Gek (Note: Chinese: 潘惜玉; Pe̍h-ōe-jī: Phoaⁿ Sioh-ge̍k; pinyin: Pān Xīyù) (born 19 August 1958) is a Singaporean business executive and former politician. A former member of the People's Action Party (PAP), Phua was a Member of Parliament (MP) of the Aljunied Group Representation Constituency (GRC) from 2001 to 2011.

== Career ==
Phua was the general manager of NTUC Fairprice Co-operative's real estate business unit and the managing director of estate management company SLF Management Services. She was also the Chief Executive Officer of Bishan–Toa Payoh Town Council and Chairperson of Aljunied Town Council.

After her election defeat, Phua joined real estate consultancy Knight Frank Singapore in 2013 as its executive director of retail services, and Viking Offshore And Marine in 2015 as a director.

=== Political career ===
Phua made her political debut in the 2001 general election in Aljunied GRC as part of a five-member PAP team, winning in a walkover. She was then assigned to the Paya Lebar ward.

In the 2011 general election, Phua stood for reelection in Aljunied GRC, but lost to a Workers' Party (WP) team consisting of Low Thia Khiang, Pritam Singh, Sylvia Lim, Faisal Manap and Chen Show Mao. It was the first time an opposition party had won a GRC since the GRC system was introduced in 1988. The PAP received 45.28% of the vote compared to the WP's 54.72%.

Phua retired from politics after her electoral loss.
