= Northwest (disambiguation) =

Northwest is a compass point.

Northwest, North-West or North West may also refer to:

- Northwest (direction), an intercardinal direction

== Geography ==
=== Africa ===
- North West (Nigeria)
- North West Tunisia
- North-West District (Botswana)
- Northwest Region (Cameroon)
- North West (South African province)

=== Asia and Oceania ===
- North West Australia, an unofficial geographical region
- North West Delhi, India
- Northwest Province (IMCRA region), an Australian marine biogeographic province
- North West District, Singapore
- North-West Frontier Province, former name of the Pakistani province Khyber Pakhtunkhwa
- Tay Bac, literally Northwest Vietnam

=== Europe ===
- North West England, region
- Northern and Western Region, region in the Republic of Ireland
- North-West (European Parliament constituency), in the Republic of Ireland (2004 to 2014)
- Copenhagen North West, Denmark
- Northwestern Krai or Northwestern Land in the historical Russian Empire

=== Americas ===
- Northwestern United States
- Pacific Northwest, unofficial region in the United States and Canada
- Northwest Territories, federal territory of Canada
- Northwest Territories (electoral district), Canadian federal electoral district
- North-Western Territory, former territory in British North America administered by the Hudson's Bay Company
- Northwest Passage, sea route traversing Canada's Arctic archipelago
- Northwest Territory, former incorporated territory of the United States in the Great Lakes region
- Northwest Washington, D.C., in the United States
- Northwest District, Portland, Oregon, in the United States
- Argentine Northwest

== Schools ==
- Northwest High School (disambiguation), several high schools
- Northwest School, Seattle, Washington
- Northwest University (disambiguation), several schools

== People and characters ==
- Northwest Smith, a character in science fiction stories by C. L. Moore
- Pacifica Northwest, a character in the 2012 animated series Gravity Falls
- North West (musician) (born 2013), American musician, daughter of Kanye West and Kim Kardashian

== Other uses ==
- Northwest Airlines, a former major airline purchased by Delta Air Lines that ceased operating in 2009
- Northwest Ordinance, a U.S. ordinance outlining the provisions of accepting a new state
- Northwest Stadium, sports stadium in Landover, Maryland
- North West Stadium, sports stadium in Welkom, South Africa
- North West, a vessel operated by the Hudson's Bay Company (HBC) from 1882 to 1897; see Hudson's Bay Company vessels

== See also ==
- Norwest (disambiguation)
- Northwestern (disambiguation)
- Northwestern Province (disambiguation)
- Northwest Passage (disambiguation)
- Nord-Ouest (disambiguation)
- Nord-Vest (development region), a region in Romania
