= Northwestern =

Northwestern or North-western or North western may refer to:

- Northwest, a direction
- Northwestern University, a private research university in Evanston, Illinois
  - The Northwestern Wildcats, this school's intercollegiate athletic program
  - Northwestern Medicine, an academic medical system comprising:
    - Northwestern University Feinberg School of Medicine
    - Northwestern Memorial Hospital.

== Other colleges and universities ==
- Northwestern College (Iowa), a small Christian college in Iowa
- University of Northwestern – St. Paul (formerly Northwestern College), a small Christian college, located in Roseville, Minnesota
- The former Northwestern College in Watertown, Wisconsin, which was incorporated into Martin Luther College in New Ulm, Minnesota in 1995
- Northwestern Michigan College, a small college located in Traverse City, Michigan
- Northwestern Oklahoma State University in Alva, Oklahoma
- Northwestern State University, in Natchitoches, Louisiana
- Northwestern California University School of Law, an online based law school in Sacramento, California
- Northwestern Polytechnic University in Fremont, California

== Other schools ==
- Northwestern High School (disambiguation), a number of high schools in the United States

== Geographic areas ==
- Northwestern United States, a region of the United States of America
- North Western Oklahoma City, a district of Oklahoma City around Western Avenue
- North West Province, South Africa, a province of South Africa
- North Western Province, Sri Lanka, a province of Sri Lanka
- North-Western Province, Zambia, one of Zambia's ten provinces
- Northwestern Federal District, Russia
- Northwestern Krai, a subdivision of Imperial Russia
- North-Western Territory, a Hudson's Bay Company region, precursor to today's Northwest Territories though including what is now Yukon Territory
- North-Western Provinces, an administrative region in British India

== Other ==
- Northwestern Memorial Hospital, a nationally ranked academic medical center in Chicago, Illinois
- Northwestern Station in Chicago, Illinois
- The Chicago and North Western Railway
- The Oshkosh Northwestern, a daily newspaper based in Oshkosh, Wisconsin
- FV Northwestern crab fishing vessel featured on Deadliest Catch
- The Northwestern (band), a British rock band
- Northwestern (genre), a genre of literature and film depicting Westerns set in Canada and Alaska
- North Western Road Car Company (1923), the historic 1923-1974 bus company based in Stockport, England
- North Western Road Car Company (1986), the historic 1986-1997 bus company based in Liverpool, England
- North Western Railway (disambiguation)

== See also ==
- Northwest (disambiguation)
