= List of Singaporean Community Development Councils (2001–2006) =

The following is a list of Singaporean Community Development Councils from 2001 to 2006.

On 24 November 2001, the nine Community Development Councils that were created in 1997 were reduced to five. The five CDCs have remained unchanged since then except for their constituencies which change following a general election.

Community Development Council	Constituencies	Electorate (2001)	
Community Development Council	Constituencies	Constituency	CDC
Central Singapore	Ang Mo Kio GRC	166,644	522,683
Central Singapore	Bishan–Toa Payoh GRC	114,621	522,683
Central Singapore	Jalan Besar GRC	100,268	522,683
Central Singapore	Tanjong Pagar GRC	141,150	522,683
North East	Aljunied GRC	125,115	408,018
North East	Pasir Ris–Punggol GRC	134,151	408,018
North East	Tampines GRC	125,432	408,018
North East	Hougang SMC	23,320	408,018
North West	Holland–Bukit Panjang GRC	118,834	336,411
North West	Sembawang GRC	166,137	336,411
North West	Nee Soon Central SMC	22,975	336,411
North West	Nee Soon East SMC	28,465	336,411
South East	East Coast GRC	144,012	344,557
South East	Marine Parade GRC	140,174	344,557
South East	Joo Chiat SMC	21,745	344,557
South East	MacPherson SMC	22,010	344,557
South East	Potong Pasir SMC	16,616	344,557
South West	Hong Kah GRC	129,073	425,254
South West	Jurong GRC	115,113	425,254
South West	West Coast GRC	110,779	425,254
South West	Ayer Rajah SMC	18,475	425,254
South West	Bukit Timah SMC	26,951	425,254
South West	Chua Chu Kang SMC	24,863	425,254
