= 2020 Singaporean general election =

- 10 July 2020

All 93 directly elected seats in Parliament (and up to 12 NCMPs)
- Registered: 2,651,435
- Turnout: 95.81% (▲2.11pp)
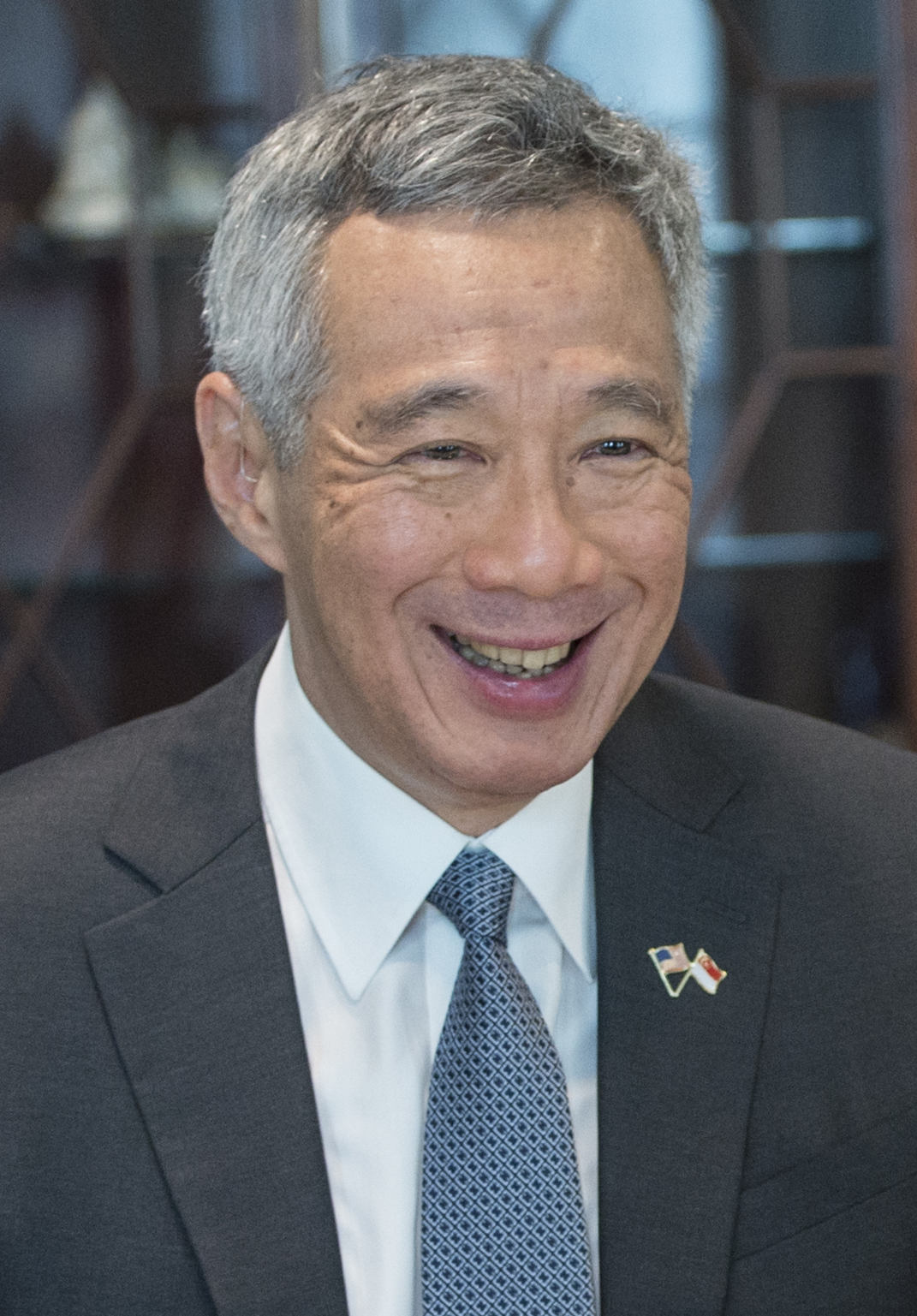

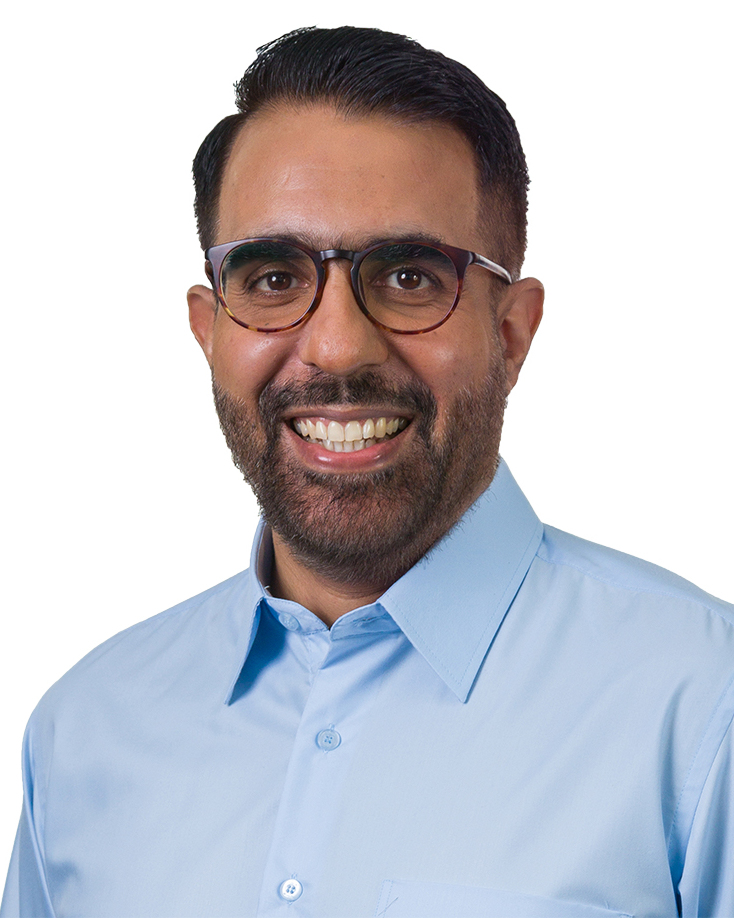

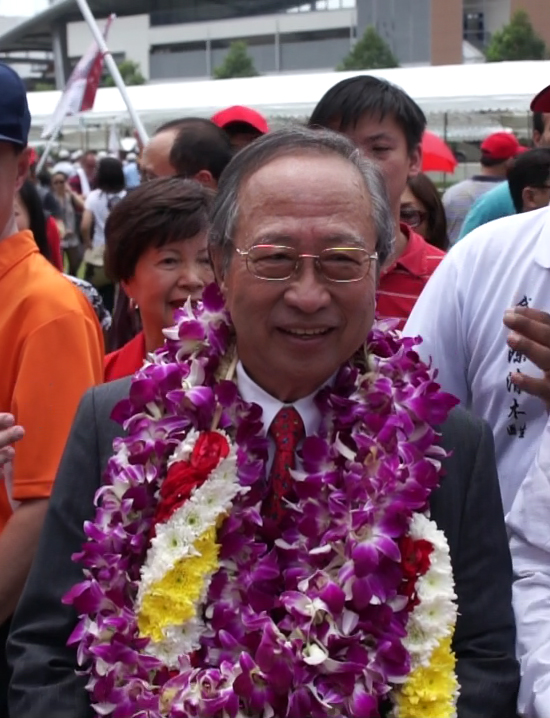
	First party	Second party	Third party
Leader	Lee Hsien Loong	Pritam Singh	Tan Cheng Bock
Party	PAP	WP	PSP
Leader's seat	Ang Mo Kio GRC	Aljunied GRC	None (contested West Coast GRC, lost)
Last election	69.86%, 83 seats	12.48%, 9 seats	Did not exist
Seats won	83	10	2
Seat change	Steady	▲1	New
Popular vote	1,527,491	279,922	253,996
Percentage	61.23%	11.22%	10.18%
Swing	▼8.63pp	▼1.26pp	New
Prime Minister before election
Lee Hsien Loong
PAP
Prime Minister after election
Lee Hsien Loong
PAP

General elections were held in Singapore on 10 July 2020 to elect members of Parliament. They were the fifteenth general elections since the introduction of self-government in 1959 and the thirteenth since independence in 1965. Parliament was dissolved and the general election called by President Halimah Yacob on 23 June, on the advice of Prime Minister Lee Hsien Loong. The number of elected seats was increased to 93 from the 89 in the previous election. The 2020 election was the last general election under Lee's tenure as Prime Minister prior to the handover of his successor, Lawrence Wong, in May 2024.

The election was significantly influenced by the COVID-19 pandemic, which became a central issue in the campaign. The governing People's Action Party (PAP) emphasised its management of the crisis, including securing supplies of face masks and increasing tests. In contrast, opposition parties criticised the government's handling of the pandemic, particularly the high number of COVID-19 cases in foreign worker dormitories and the Ministry of Health's reversal of its guidance on mask usage. Beyond the pandemic, other key issues that emerged during the election included the cost of living, housing affordability, population growth and immigration policies. The election also featured constituency political broadcasts, a televised programme hosted by Mediacorp, which replaced physical rallies that were suspended as part of social distancing measures.

For only the second consecutive election since independence, no seats were elected via a walkover on nomination day. On polling day, the ruling PAP secured its 15th consecutive term in government since 1959, winning 83 of the 93 elected seats and retaining its supermajority. The Workers' Party (WP) captured the remaining 10 with a record-best 50.49% of the contested vote across the six constituencies it contested against the PAP, making it the first time in a general election where the PAP lost the combined popular vote in constituencies contested by an opposition party. Despite the challenges posed by the pandemic, the election also recorded the highest voter turnout since 1997, and it was the first election in which more than 1 million votes were not cast for the PAP (invalid or otherwise for the opposition). (Note: There were 1,527,491 total votes cast for the PAP out of 2,540,359 total votes cast, leaving 1,012,868 votes that were not for the PAP.)

== Background ==
According to Article 65(4) of the Constitution, the maximum term of any given Parliament is five years from the date of its first sitting following a general election, after which it is dissolved by operation of law. However, the prime minister may advise the President to dissolve Parliament at any time during the five-year period. A general election must be held within three months after every dissolution of Parliament. Elections are conducted by the Elections Department (ELD), which is under the Prime Minister's Office.

There are 93 elected seats in Parliament organised into 14 single-member constituencies (SMCs) and 17 group representation constituencies (GRCs). Each SMC returns one Member of Parliament using the first-past-the-post (FPTP) voting system, while each GRC returns four or five MPs through party block voting (the general ticket). At least one candidate in each GRC team must be from the Malay, Indian or other minority communities. A group of candidates wishing to stand for election in a GRC must all be members of the same political party, or a group of independent candidates, resulting in a situation where the victorious party obtains 100% of the seats in a given GRC. The voting age in Singapore is 21 years, with eligibility to voters who were born before 1 March 1999.

On 23 June 2020 at 16:00 Prime Minister Lee Hsien Loong announced during a live televised announcement that President Halimah Yacob had dissolved the 13th Parliament of Singapore on the same day and had issued a writ of election with nominations to be held a week later on 30 June 2020.

The returning officer was Tan Meng Dui, a former deputy secretary at the Ministry of National Development and CEO of the National Environment Agency.

=== Political parties ===
The governing People's Action Party, having been in power since 1959, was led by Lee Hsien Loong throughout the election period. The leading opposition party is the Workers' Party led by Pritam Singh, with six elected seats and three NCMP seats before the election. A total of ten opposition parties challenged the ruling party in this election.

Party	Leader	Slogan	Votes in GE2015	Seats won	Remarks
People's Action Party	Lee Hsien Loong	"Our Lives, Our Jobs, Our Future"	69.86%	83 / 89	82 seats at time of dissolution.
Workers' Party	Pritam Singh	"Make Your Vote Count"	12.48%	6 / 89	Including three Non-constituency MPs.
Singapore Democratic Party	Chee Soon Juan	"4 Yes 1 No"	3.76%	0 / 89	
National Solidarity Party	Spencer Ng	"Your Future, Our Priority"	3.53%	0 / 89	
Reform Party	Kenneth Jeyaretnam	"Build Back Better, Fairer"	2.63%	0 / 89	
Singapore People's Party	Steve Chia	"A Better Tomorrow"	2.17%	0 / 89	
Singapore Democratic Alliance	Desmond Lim Bak Chuan	"A Heart for the People"	2.06%	0 / 89	Alliance with Singapore Justice Party and Singapore Malay National Organisation parties.
People's Power Party	Goh Meng Seng	"A Strong Parliament"	1.13%	0 / 89	
Peoples Voice	Lim Tean	"Make Singapore Our Home Again"	Did not exist		
Progress Singapore Party	Tan Cheng Bock	"You Deserve Better"	Did not exist		
Red Dot United	Ravi Philemon	"Explore New Directions Together"	Did not exist		

=== Changes in election process ===
The Elections Department introduced several new features for this election to help ease the election process for voters, candidates and election volunteers. Registration of voters on polling day will be done electronically and election officials need not manually strike out a voter's particulars from a hardcopy register of electors. Voters will be able to mark their candidate(s) choices more clearly using self-inking pens and enjoy shorter queuing time with the introduction of the e-registration system. Candidates are able to fill in most of the necessary documents online while election volunteers are able to count the number of votes within a shorter duration with the help of counting machines, enabling election results to be released at least 50 minutes earlier. In addition, there will be more polling stations, reducing the average number of voters per polling station from 3,000 to about 2,400. Senior citizens above the age of 65 will be given priority to vote between 8 am and 12 pm on Polling Day.

Election recount can occur if the margin of results for a constituency are within a 2% range. Unlike the previous elections, the recount is now triggered automatically rather than being called out manually from the candidates or counting agents, and that only one application for a recount may be called; additionally, a standby counting machine would be used for recount instead of being manually counted. Similar to past elections, overseas votes is disregarded during a recount of votes as it does not cause any impact from the eventual results, unless if the total overseas electorate is greater than the difference of votes.

=== Non-constituency Member of Parliament ===
On 27 January 2016, an amendment to the Constitution was passed, increasing the minimum number of opposition Members of Parliament by three to 12 members. This is the first increase for the number of opposition MPs allocated since the 2011 Singaporean general election, when it was increased from three members to nine. As in the case for previous elections, NCMP seats are offered to the best-performing non-elected opposition candidates, with the number determined by the total number of opposition candidates elected; if there are at least 12 opposition candidates elected, then NCMP seats will not be offered, as previously seen in the 1991 election. The names of the eligible candidates are announced a few days after the polling day. Candidates may decline the post if offered, as previously seen in the 1984 and 2015 elections.

=== Electoral divisions ===
	2015	2020
Seats	89	93
Electoral divisions	29	31
Group representation constituencies	16	17
Four-Member GRCs	6	6
Five-Member GRCs	8	11
Six-Member GRCs	2	0
Single member constituencies	13	14
Average GRC size	4.75	4.65
Voters	2,458,058	2,647,372
Voters (overseas votes inclusive)	2,462,926	2,653,942
Average electorate per seat	27,673	28,510

Electoral boundaries

The Electoral Boundaries Review Committee is made up of senior civil servants and charged with adjusting the boundaries of electoral divisions prior to an election. The government officially claims this as necessary to ensure minority participation in Parliament amidst demographic changes while ensuring an equitable number of voters represented per MP, though critics have raised allegations of gerrymandering to disadvantage the opposition. As of 2015, there were 16 GRCs and 13 SMCs. Prime Minister Lee convened the committee on 1 August 2019 with instructions to reduce the size of GRCs and increase the number of SMCs. The exact date of formation was revealed only when Pritam Singh asked Trade and Industry Minister Chan Chun Sing in a written reply in Parliament.

The Committee released its report on 13 March 2020 with the formation of 17 GRCs and 14 SMCs, increasing its seats from 89 to 93. For the first time since 1991, there are no six-member GRCs as its only two GRCs were both reduced by one seat to five. A new Sengkang GRC was formed from portions of the former Punggol East and Sengkang West SMCs and the boundaries of Tampines GRC were altered for the first time since 2001, due to the increase in population in the northeastern area of Singapore. Four new SMCs were also carved out (Kebun Baru, Yio Chu Kang, Marymount and Punggol West), three former SMCs were absorbed into neighbouring GRCs (Fengshan, Punggol East and Sengkang West), while two SMCs (Hong Kah North and Potong Pasir) had their boundaries modified. The remaining eight SMCs and four GRCs, namely Aljunied, Holland–Bukit Timah, Jurong and Tanjong Pagar, were left untouched. The changes saw about 13% of voters being allocated to a new constituency.

=== Disruptions from COVID-19 pandemic ===
During a Straits Times forum on 11 March, Deputy Prime Minister Heng Swee Keat said that the timing of the elections could be affected in view of the worsening pandemic. On 25 March, Senior Minister Teo Chee Hean told Parliament that he believed it would be unconstitutional for the President to form a caretaker government unless a state of emergency had been recommended by the Cabinet to the President.

On 28 March, Tan Cheng Bock responded to Teo's comments by saying that the unconstitutional nature of a caretaker government as a result of a postponing a general election would be far more preferred than having a health emergency by exposing millions of Singaporeans to potential COVID-19 infection.

On 7 April, Minister for Trade and Industry Chan Chun Sing introduced the Parliamentary Elections (COVID-19 Special Arrangements) Bill to Parliament which would allow voters under Stay-Home Notices or Quarantine Orders related to COVID-19 to vote outside of their normal electoral divisions in the upcoming General Election. The Bill was passed by Parliament on 4 May and assented to by the President on 15 May. The Parliamentary Elections (COVID-19 Special Arrangements) Act 2020 came into operation on 26 May.

On 1 July, the Parliamentary Elections (COVID-19 Special Arrangements) Regulations 2020 was made to provide for mobile polling teams at special polling stations and to allow voters who have fever or on COVID-19 stay orders to vote from 7 pm to 8 pm on polling day.

==== Restrictions on election campaigning ====
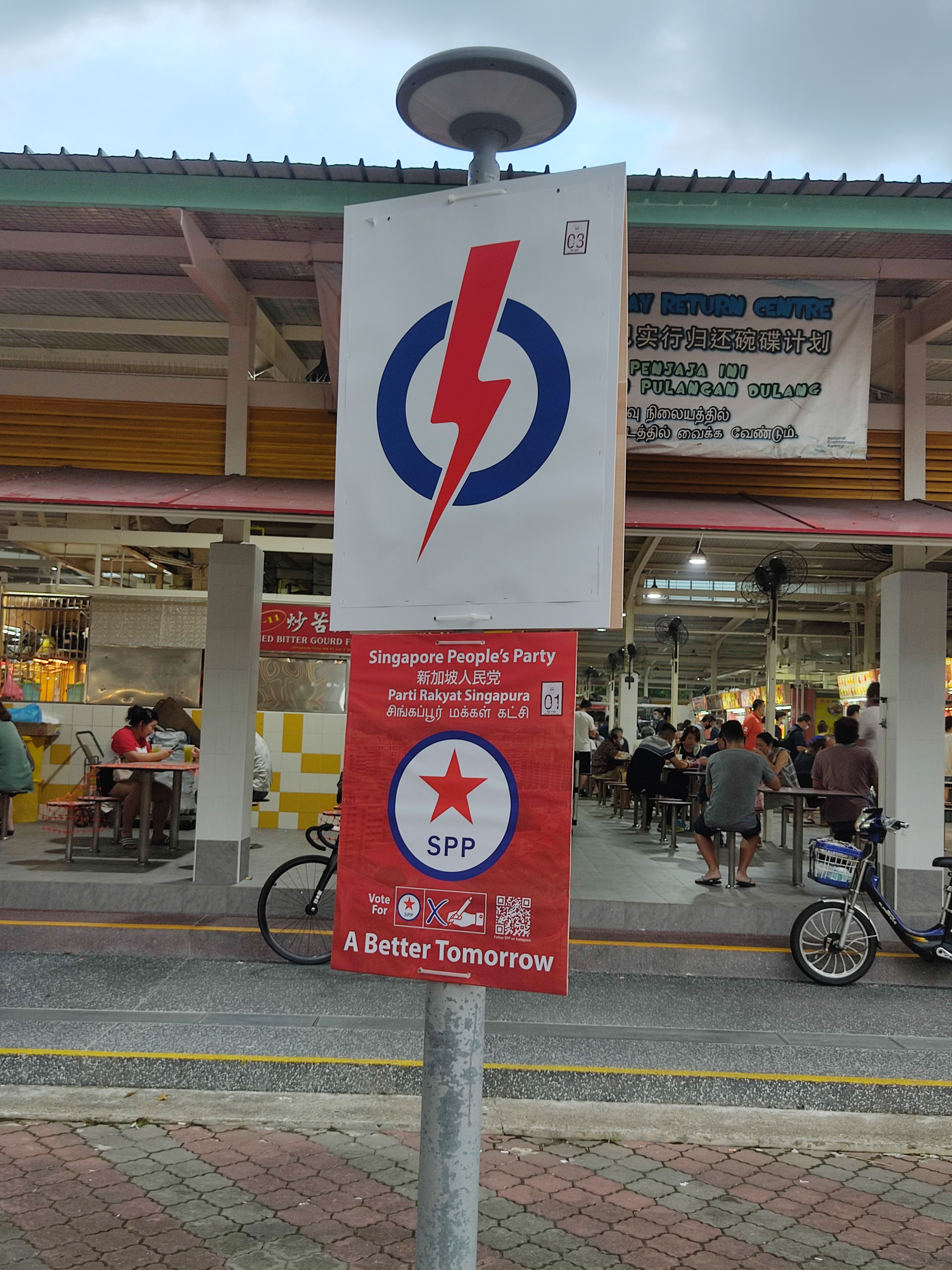
PAP and SPP campaign posters during the GE2020.

On 18 June, the ELD introduced temporary measures to reduce the risk of transmission of COVID-19, such as no rallies and TV screenings pertaining to the election are to be held, instead replacing with e-rallies and a new "Constituency Political Broadcast", and nomination centres will no longer admit members of the public or supporters during nomination day. Walkabouts and campaigning vehicles are still allowed, though safe distancing and minimal physical contact still applies, and candidates are also not allowed to make speeches or physical rallies, including during the campaigning from campaigning vehicles, meaning that there will be no parades held by the candidates after the election, though it can still broadcast any pre-recorded messages.

==== Restrictions during polling day ====
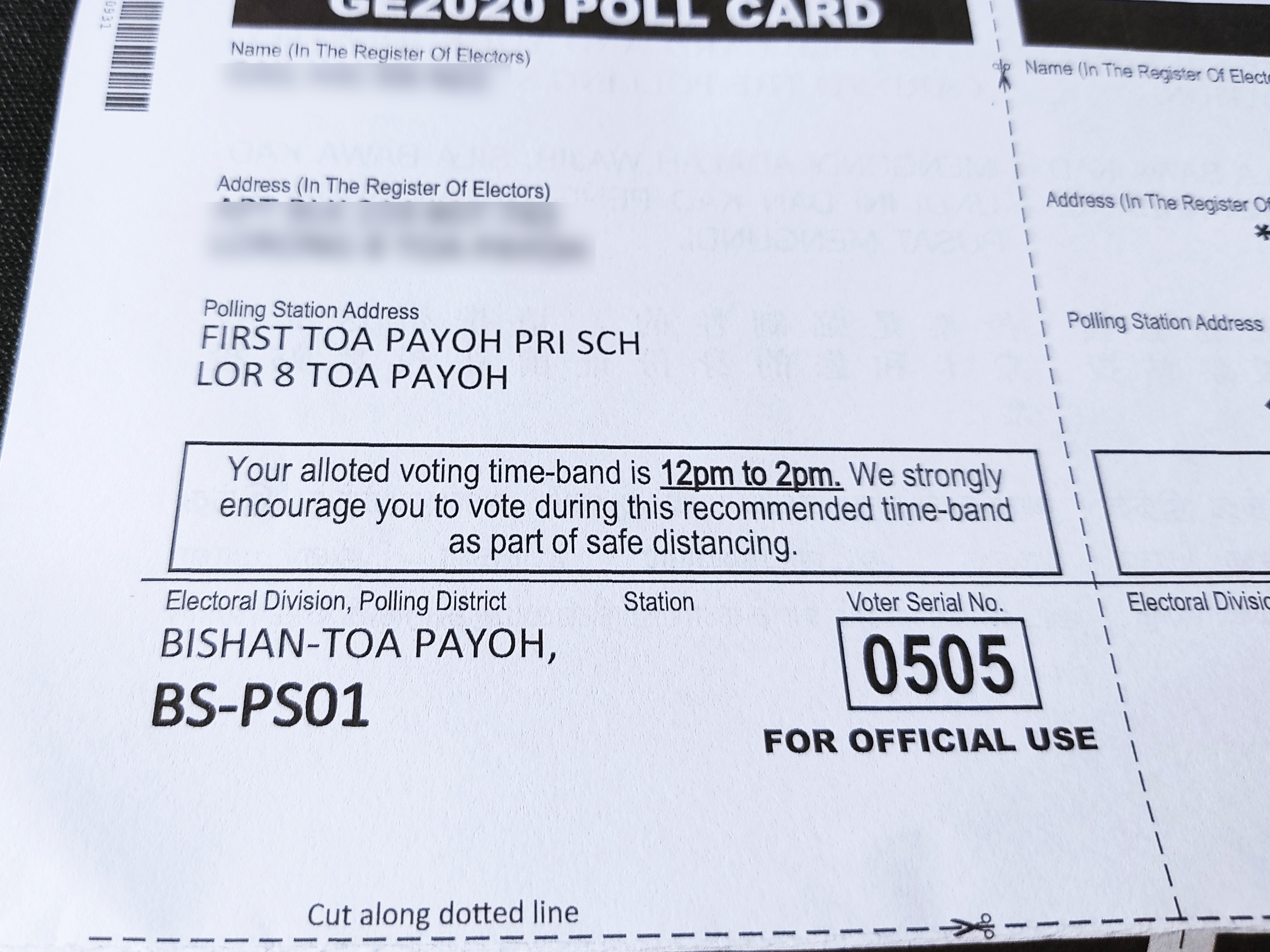
A polling card which included a recommended two-hour time slot.

Voters were given a recommended two-hour time slot to cast their vote on Polling Day (from 8 am to 8 pm) on their ballot card as a measure to counter long queues during polling. Measures for safe distancing still apply on polling day. Voters with fever or respiratory symptoms would be denied entry from the polling stations, except during the last hour (7 pm to 8 pm). Voters who are unable to vote because of medical issues, or because they are overseas, will be delisted from the registrar of voters due to mandatory voting, but will not need to pay the $50 fee for reinstating their names. Voters had to use hand sanitizer before voting, and were initially required to wear disposible gloves, but this was later changed due to the requirement causing long queues. Elderly voters above the age of 65 were given a special time slot in the morning. The restrictions caused long queues at polling stations.

For overseas voting (which was held in ten cities, Dubai, London, Tokyo, Beijing, Washington, D.C., Hong Kong, Shanghai, San Francisco, New York City and Canberra), voting was subject to the approval of the authorities in the affected countries, while ELD announced that they would release the arrangements for returning Singaporeans who are issued a mandatory 14-day stay home notice to vote in hotels and reducing the risk of infecting others. These arrangements were later officially announced on 1 July, when the Singapore government announced that special polling stations will be set up in Marina Bay Sands and JW Marriott Hotel Singapore South Beach to accommodate voters serving their stay-home notices in the two hotels.

350 voters who are quarantined at the time did not vote as they are not allowed to leave their place where they were currently isolated to cast their vote.

=== Extension of polling hours ===
The polls were slated to close at 8 pm; however, in an unprecedented move in Singapore electoral history, the Elections Department extended the voting hours till 10 pm, just within two hours before its initial closing time. According to the Elections Department, there were long queues at some polling stations, and the extension was to "allow enough time for all voters to cast their votes". This drew criticism from several opposition parties for compromising the integrity of the election, as some were unable to field a polling agent to supervise the sealing of ballot boxes. The Elections Department replied that polling and counting procedures will continue as normal.

== Political developments ==
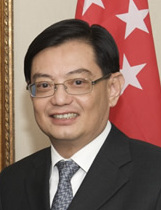
Heng Swee Keat was widely tipped to succeed Lee Hsien Loong as the next prime minister of Singapore; he withdrew himself from the nomination in 2021; Heng would retire from politics in 2025.

=== People's Action Party ===
On 13 March 2016, the PAP MP for Bukit Batok SMC David Ong resigned over personal indiscretions with a party grassroots activist. In the subsequent Bukit Batok by-election, the PAP candidate and former Aljunied GRC candidate Murali Pillai defeated the opposition SDP candidate Chee Soon Juan to reclaim the seat for the PAP.

In the lead up to the 2017 Singapore presidential election, Speaker of Parliament and MP for Marsiling–Yew Tee GRC Halimah Yacob resigned from the party on 7 August 2017 to fulfil regulations which prohibit the President of Singapore from any party affiliations. As she had vacated her seat in Parliament, there were calls for a by-election, though the Court of Appeal eventually ruled that there was "no duty to call a by-election when a single vacancy arises in a GRC".

On 23 November 2018, Heng Swee Keat and Chan Chun Sing were respectively elected as the party's first and second assistant secretary-general to the PAP's 35th Central Executive Committee (CEC). The two assistant posts were seen as an indicator of Lee Hsien Loong's successor, given that the upcoming election is likely to be Lee's last. Following the announcement of Heng Swee Keat's appointment as the sole deputy prime minister on 1 May 2019, succeeding Teo Chee Hean and Tharman Shanmugaratnam, former MP Inderjit Singh said that the PAP intends to showcase Heng's imminent ascent to the top post and dispel rumours of any surprises in the leadership succession.

=== Workers' Party ===
On 3 November 2017, then-secretary-general and Aljunied GRC incumbent MP Low Thia Khiang announced during a speech on the party's 60th anniversary that he would not contest the next party elections. During the party's 2016 CEC election, Chen Show Mao had mounted a surprise challenge for the leadership post but lost the election to Low in a 41–65 vote. In the leadership election on 8 April 2018, Pritam Singh was elected unopposed as successor to Low as the party's new secretary-general.

Observers say that the lack of a contest was a good sign of internal unity, and that the party is keen to demonstrate its multiracial credentials now that it has a minority secretary-general, for the first time since 2001 with J. B. Jeyaretnam.

On 30 April 2020, Low was hospitalised due to a head injury, and was discharged on 21 May. On 25 June, while Low was on rehabilitation, the party announced he (and along with Chen and Png Eng Huat) will not seek election for the first time in his 32-year career, though he has not ruled out his retirement from politics; in his interview, he cited his satisfaction on his leadership, saying that 'I felt my work was done'. It would be the last election where Low was active as he announced his political retirement on 7 December 2024.

=== New parties ===
- 2011 presidential election candidate and former Ayer Rajah SMC MP Tan Cheng Bock returned to politics under the Progress Singapore Party that he founded together with several previously contested candidates on 18 January 2019. The PSP was registered by the Registrar of Societies on 28 March 2019. The PSP announced on 26 June 2020 its line-up of candidates for the nine constituencies it will be contesting, with party chief Tan Cheng Bock leading a team in West Coast GRC, a ward that has his former constituency of Ayer Rajah.
- Former leader of the National Solidarity Party, Lim Tean founded Peoples Voice which was registered by the Registrar of Societies on 31 October 2018.
- On 29 May 2020, Ravi Philemon and Michelle Lee Juen submitted an application to register a new political party, Red Dot United (RDU), with the Registrar of Societies. Prior to the foundation, they were former members from the Progress Singapore Party. The party was registered on 15 June 2020.

=== Extraparliamentary parties ===
- Singapore Democratic Party began campaigning on 23 February 2019, and announced a few key campaign agendas over March and May that year. Ahead of the election, the party recruited ex-DPP leader Benjamin Pwee.
- On 16 October 2019, the Singapore People's Party saw its first major leadership change since its formation with opposition veteran Chiam See Tong stepping down as secretary-general of the SPP after holding the post for 23 years since December 1996, with former Non-constituency Member of Parliament Steve Chia succeeding Chiam on 5 November 2019.
- On 3 January 2020, four political parties (Singaporeans First, People's Power Party, Reform Party and Democratic Progressive Party) formally agreed to contest in the election as an alliance. Three months later, on 1 April, the four parties decided to join the Singapore Democratic Alliance instead; however, the SDA has since placed their membership applications on hold, though it seeks to maintain an informal alliance. On 25 June, Singaporeans First's chief Tan Jee Say announced the party's dissolution. On 27 June, the Democratic Progressive Party announced its withdrawal from contesting the election.

== Political issues ==
=== Battleground constituencies ===
Many media outlets such as 8world, CNA, The Straits Times, Today and Mothership named several constituencies as its "hotspot" states for the election:

- Aljunied GRC (2% margin of WP's 2015 victory, Low's departure from the party leadership, and Aljunied–Hougang Town Council's funding scandals)
- Bukit Batok SMC and Bukit Panjang SMC (respectively contested by SDP leaders Chee Soon Juan and Paul Tambyah)
- East Coast GRC (WP's strong performance in 2011 and 2015, which granted the party NCMP seats, including in the defunct Fengshan SMC)
- Marine Parade GRC (WP contest and the retirement of Goh Chok Tong)
- Sengkang GRC (new constituency covering prior WP-contested constituencies in the Sengkang planning area, including Punggol East SMC)
- West Coast GRC (PSP's contest, notably Tan Cheng Bock's strong performance in Ayer Rajah SMC, now part of the constituency)

=== Criticisms of the government's response to the COVID-19 pandemic ===
Many opposition parties criticized the PAP government's handling of the pandemic. SDP's chairman Paul Tambyah, who is an infectious disease expert and president-elect of the International Society for Infectious Diseases, claimed that the government was more concerned over a shortfall of masks than public health when it issued advisories not to wear masks unless a person was unwell. Peoples Voice chief Lim Tean also charged that the PAP had failed to act with "speed and decisiveness" despite having reportedly learnt the lessons from SARS 17 years ago. PSP candidate Ang Yong Guan questioned the belated "one-month delay" response after a foreign worker was admitted to hospital, which saw the virus rapidly spreading within their dormitories unchecked, leading to Singapore having the highest number of cases within ASEAN. PSP chief Tan Cheng Bock, in his 2 July Party Political Broadcast said the PAP government's "boasting in January failed to prepare Singapore for the explosion of dormitory cases in April."

=== 10 million population controversy ===
During the English-language debate, SDP Secretary-General Chee Soon Juan touched on one of its campaign promises of saying no to a 10 million population in Singapore, citing a 2019 article from The Straits Times, to which PAP representative Vivian Balakrishnan replied that the Prime Minister's Office had issued a statement that day "advising people like you not to indulge in falsehoods" and denied that there would be a population of 10 million in Singapore, adding that the figure was a "strawman".

PAP candidate and Deputy Prime Minister Heng Swee Keat denied saying that Singapore should plan to increase its population to 10 million people. He reiterated the Singapore government's stance that it had "never proposed or targeted for Singapore to increase the population to 10 million". PAP candidate Vivian Balakrishnan also called for the SDP to clarify its claim. Nevertheless, the SDP later claimed victory for pressuring the PAP into declaring that it did not have a population target of 10 million, to which a PAP spokesman denounced as a "falsehood" which "renders the campaign pointless, and calls into question the integrity of the whole party". The National Population and Talent Division of the Prime Minister's Office also objected to the claim.

The dispute between the PAP and the SDP continued, with Paul Tambyah and Chee Soon Juan defending SDP's decision to press the PAP about plans for a population target of 10 million for Singapore, saying that PAP was now forced to clarify and assure Singaporeans that there are no such plans. Paul pointed out that PAP could have clarified the matter earlier but did not do so, adding that he was "baffled" that the PAP called the target a "falsehood" perpetuated by the SDP. Both WP and PSP also reacted to the dispute; WP Secretary-General Pritam Singh said that there was "room for fair comment" as it was not clear if SDP's stance could be considered a "falsehood" or not; however he did not endorse either side and said that it was a matter that WP was not involved in. Separately, PSP Secretary-General Tan Cheng Bock said that the issue came about due to a lack of transparency from the Singapore government. Heng Swee Keat claimed that the SDP had "erected a bogeyman" and said that he was expecting integrity and honesty from all candidates contesting in the election, to which Tambyah said that the PAP "should take up any unhappiness it may have over the claim with The Straits Times", adding that Singaporeans should read the article concerned to make their own judgements. PAP later issued a statement, saying that it was "disappointed but not surprised" at SDP's response, and claimed that "the SDP have dug their heels in, repeated their falsehoods and refused to apologise to Singaporeans for misleading them" and that "Dr Chee has not changed, cannot change and will never change".

Paul Tambyah and Chee Soon Juan responded to PAP's statement issued the previous day; Tambyah said that PAP's comments were "a sign of desperation" and that it showed that PAP had "run out of ideas" and "resorted to the old PAP tactics of just politics of personal destruction", while Chee said PAP was "beating a dead horse". Nevertheless, the two SDP leaders said that it was time for the election campaign to move on from the dispute. In addition, the Association of Women for Action and Research criticised PAP's statement to SDP the previous day as PAP had used an analogy involving spousal abuse to make a point. Both SDP and PV's Facebook pages, as well as several other Facebook pages belonging to others, were issued correction directions by the alternate authority of the Protection from Online Falsehoods and Manipulation Act Office over the claim of plans for a population target of 10 million for Singapore.

=== Opposition wipeout concerns ===
In introducing WP's manifesto, Pritam Singh stated that there was a "real risk" of a wipeout of elected opposition MPs, adding that WP candidates must be voted into Parliament to serve the public in Parliament and strengthen democracy. PAP Secretary-General Lee Hsien Loong said that the possibility was an unrealistic outcome, claiming that Singh's argument was "a tactic" and added that he was "using reverse psychology". Two other PAP incumbent candidates, Chan Chun Sing and Indranee Rajah, also responded to Singh's point, saying that it would be a mistake for voters to think that the PAP would return to power effortlessly, while adding that it was important for the PAP to get a "clear and strong endorsement" from the people.

=== Allegations of discriminatory comments by Raeesah Khan ===
On 5 July, reports emerged that two separate police reports were lodged against WP's Sengkang GRC candidate Raeesah Khan for her online comments, which allegedly promoted enmity between different religious and racial groups. Her Facebook post in May 2020 had criticised the Singapore law enforcement authorities for discriminating against Singaporean citizens and said that "rich Chinese" and "white people" were treated differently under the law, which was largely based on the differences in sentences handed out to individuals who broke the "circuit breaker" measures in the midst of the COVID-19 pandemic, and another Facebook post in February 2018 focused on the 2018 City Harvest Church ruling. WP swiftly came out to support Raeesah; in a press conference with WP chief Pritam Singh, chairperson Sylvia Lim and the Sengkang GRC team, Raeesah also apologised and released a statement stating that her intention was "never to cause social divisions but to raise awareness on minority issues", adding that she also regretted making her "insensitive" comments.

On 7 July, PAP released a statement accusing Raeesah of admitting to "making highly derogatory statements about Chinese and Christians" and asked "Why does the WP still consider her worthy of consideration as an MP?" PSP chief Tan Cheng Bock weighed in on the controversy and accused the PAP of engaging in "gutter politics". He questioned the PAP to "look at themselves and see whether they have conducted themselves in a gentlemanly way". Similarly, the police revealed that they were investigating the man who allegedly reported Raeesah over social media comments which intended to wound religious and racial feelings.

On 17 September, the Singapore Police Force announced that it had concluded its investigations into the two incidents, and that aside from a "stern warning" to both Raeesah and the blogger; neither action was taken against both.

=== Allegations of racist comments by Heng Swee Keat ===
A series of police reports were made in reaction to the first police report, including one against Heng Swee Keat, who had remarked that Singaporeans were "not ready for a prime minister from a minority race" or someone that was non-Chinese, and one against the People's Action Party's press statement on WP Raeesah Khan, both on the grounds of promoting enmity between different religious or racial groups. In a statement on 8 July, the police deemed that no offence had been committed by the PAP. The Singapore Police Force, after consultation with the Attorney-General's Chambers, stated that "Mr Heng's remarks, in the context they were made, do not evidence any intent to wound anyone's racial feelings or promote enmity between different races". Since news broke of the statement released by the police, netizens have spoken out about how they felt Heng's statement was racist.

== Timeline ==
Map of contested electoral divisions among opposition parties

Date	Event
13 March	Publication of the Electoral Boundaries report
15 April	Certification of Registers of Electors
8 June	Appointment of POFMA alternate authorities during election period
18 June	Release of preliminary campaigning guidelines
23 June	Dissolution of 13th Parliament; Writ of Election issued
26 June	Deadline of Submission of Political Donation Certificates
30 June	Nomination Day
30 June – 8 July	Campaigning Period
2 July	First Political Party Broadcast
3–8 July	Constituency Political Broadcasts
9 July	Cooling-off Day and Second Political Party Broadcast
10 July	Polling Day
14 July	Candidates revealed for Non-Constituency Member of Parliament
15 July	Overseas Votes Counting
25 July	14th Parliament assembled
24 August	Opening of 14th Parliament

=== New and outgoing candidates ===
There were a total 73 new candidates participated in the election, among which include the nation's first female brigadier-general, a few former civil servants, and a MRT train announcer who is also a candidate previously withdrew from participating in the previous election.

23 candidates (three were from the Workers' Party) did not stand for candidacy, among which were Emeritus Senior Minister and second prime minister Goh Chok Tong who stepped down from politics after 44 years, Former leader of the opposition Low Thia Khiang (the longest serving opposition MP at 29 years), Transport Minister Khaw Boon Wan, and former ministers Lim Hng Kiang, Lim Swee Say and Yaacob Ibrahim.

=== Pre-nomination day events ===
Between the start of election proceedings in March 2020 and nomination day on 30 June 2020, various political parties in Singapore made preparations to contest in the general election by revealing their candidates and manifesto to the general public.

=== Nomination day ===
On 30 June 2020 from 11 am to 12 noon SGT, each candidate filed their nomination papers (along with the approval of a proposer, a seconder and at least four assentors), a political donation certificate (by before 26 June), and paid an election deposit of S$13,500 (down from S$14,500 in the previous 2015 election, but also the same amount as seen in the 2016 by-election) in one of the nine designated schools or through online to complete their application. Additionally, in the case for Group Representation Constituencies, their team must consist of at least one minority candidate and must also submit a community committee form (Malay/Muslim or Indian/other minority which is dependent on the constituency's requirements).

The list of nine schools designated as nomination centres were:

School	Participating constituencies
Bendemeer Primary School	Bishan–Toa Payoh GRC^{M}, Jalan Besar GRC^{M}, Radin Mas SMC, Tanjong Pagar GRC^{IO}
Chongfu School	Kebun Baru SMC, Marsiling–Yew Tee GRC^{M}, Nee Soon GRC^{IO}, Sembawang GRC^{M}
Deyi Secondary School	Aljunied GRC^{M}, Ang Mo Kio GRC^{IO}, Marymount SMC, Yio Chu Kang SMC
Jurong Pioneer Junior College	Chua Chu Kang GRC^{M}, Hong Kah North SMC, Pioneer SMC
Kong Hwa School	MacPherson SMC, Marine Parade GRC^{M}, Mountbatten SMC, Potong Pasir SMC
Methodist Girls’ School	Bukit Panjang SMC, Holland–Bukit Timah GRC^{IO}
Nan Hua High School	Bukit Batok SMC, Jurong GRC^{IO}, West Coast GRC^{IO}, Yuhua SMC
Poi Ching School	Hougang SMC, Tampines GRC^{M}
St Anthony's Canossian Primary School	East Coast GRC^{M}, Pasir Ris–Punggol GRC^{M}, Punggol West SMC, Sengkang GRC^{M}

- ^{M} indicates a GRC requires a Malay/Muslim minority candidate
- ^{IO} indicates a GRC requires an Indian or other minority candidate

As in the case of previous elections, candidates will lose their deposit if they are unable to garner at least one-eighth (12.5%) of the valid votes cast within the contested constituency.

Following nomination day, all 93 seats were contested by 192 candidates from 11 parties, the most ever in the history of independent Singapore, surpassing the record set from the 2015 election, and thus become the second consecutive election not to have a walkover in any constituency. There were also a record number of female candidates participating in the election, with 40 of them contesting. Only two constituencies, Pasir Ris–Punggol GRC and Pioneer SMC, saw a three-cornered fight, with the former being the first multi-cornered contest inside a Group Representation Constituency since the 1992 Marine Parade by-election 28 years prior.

=== Pre-polling day events ===
Between nomination day (30 June 2020) and polling day (10 July 2020), candidates began campaigning on various media platforms. Online e-rallies were held in light of the COVID-19 pandemic, and political broadcasts (by party and by constituency) were aired on national television. Two round table political debates, one in English and the other in Mandarin, were also held. On the eve of polling day also known as cooling-off day, campaigning was prohibited except for party political broadcasts.

== Results ==
Map of the results of the 2020 Singapore general election

Polls closed at 10 pm and vote counting began soon after. The results were announced by the returning officer Tan Meng Dui, who is also CEO of the National Environment Agency.

Similar to the 2015 Singaporean general election and 2016 by-election, sample counts were released by the Elections Department prior to the announcement of the actual results to prevent any unnecessary speculation or reliance on unofficial sources of information while counting was still under way.

The first results were announced at 1:22 am for Bukit Panjang SMC where the PAP was elected with 53.74% of the vote. The last results came at 3:44 am, when Aljunied GRC and Nee Soon GRC were announced to have been retained by WP and the PAP with 59.95% and 61.90% respectively.

The WP broke the record for overall contested vote share for any opposition party with 50.49% of the votes, surpassing the previous record of 48.55% held by the Singapore Democratic Party in 1991. Six candidates, one from a SMC and five from a GRC, each lost their $13,500 deposit in the election, the biggest number of candidates to do so since the 1980 election. Furthermore, out of 40 female candidates, 28 women (including four opposition members) were elected as MPs, setting a record for the most ever female MPs in parliament, at 29% of the chamber, including its first female minority opposition and youngest MP-elect at 26 years of age, Raeesah Khan.

In terms of swings, all but two existing constituencies (MacPherson SMC and Mountbatten SMC) had anti-PAP swings. Big swings were seen in most constituencies of western Singapore from challenges by either the PSP or SDP, with the most notable one being West Coast GRC, where it had the largest swing in this election of 26.88%, which helped the PSP win two non-constituency seats even as the PAP retained the constituency with only 51.69% of the vote. They were taken up by Hazel Poa and Leong Mun Wai for achieving the best-performing non-elected result of any opposition slate, which was confirmed on 14 July. For the second consecutive election, the PAP safe seat of Jurong GRC saw the best result of the PAP, or any party, in any constituency in the election, with 74.62% of the vote.

Excluding the overseas electorate, voter turnout was 95.54%, or 2,535,565 voters, the highest turnout rate of any election (including both general and presidential elections) since the 1997 general election, when 95.91% voted. 1.81% of votes cast were invalid votes, the lowest rate in a general election in independent Singapore, and the lowest rate since the 1963 election when 0.99% were invalid (when Singapore was still a state in Malaysia).

Popular vote
1. PAP (61.2%)
2. WP (11.2%)
3. PSP (10.2%)
4. SDP (4.45%)
5. NSP (3.75%)
6. Others (9.15%)
Elected seats won
1. 83 seats (PAP) (89.2%)
2. 10 seats (WP) (10.8%)

Party	Votes	%	+/–	Seats	+/–
People's Action Party	1,527,491	61.23	–8.63	83	0
Workers' Party	279,922	11.22	–1.26	10	+1
Progress Singapore Party	253,996	10.18	New	2	New
Singapore Democratic Party	111,054	4.45	+0.92	0	0
National Solidarity Party	93,653	3.75	+0.22	0	0
Peoples Voice	59,183	2.37	New	0	New
Reform Party	54,599	2.19	–0.44	0	0
Singapore People's Party	37,998	1.52	–0.65	0	0
Singapore Democratic Alliance	37,237	1.49	–0.57	0	0
Red Dot United	31,260	1.25	New	0	New
People's Power Party	7,489	0.30	–0.83	0	0
Independents	655	0.03	–0.09	0	0
Total	2,494,537	100.00	–	95	+3
Valid votes	2,494,537	98.20			
Invalid/blank votes	45,822	1.80			
Total votes	2,540,359	100.00			
Registered voters/turnout	2,651,435	95.81			
Source: Singapore Elections

Opposition parties contested vote
Party	Votes
WP	50.49%
PSP	40.86%
SDP	37.04%
SPP	33.85%
NSP	33.15%
PPP	28.26%
RP	27.85%
RDU	25.39%
SDA	23.67%
PV	21.27%
Independents	2.78%

=== By constituency ===
Candidates and results of 2020 Singaporean general election
Division	Seat	Voters	Rejected	Party	Candidate(s)	Votes	Votes %	Sample counts %	Overseas vote difference	Swing	Margins
Bukit Batok SMC	1	29,948	533	People's Action Party	Murali Pillai	15,500	54.80 / 100	57 / 100	Steady	▼6.43	9.60%
Bukit Batok SMC	1	29,948	533	Singapore Democratic Party	Chee Soon Juan	12,787	45.20 / 100	43 / 100	Steady	▲6.43	9.60%
Bukit Panjang SMC	1	35,437	586	People's Action Party	Liang Eng Hwa	18,085	53.73 / 100	56 / 100	▼0.01	▼14.65	7.46%
Bukit Panjang SMC	1	35,437	586	Singapore Democratic Party	Paul Tambyah	15,576	46.27 / 100	44 / 100	▲0.01	▲14.65	7.46%
Hong Kah North SMC	1	28,046	403	People's Action Party	Amy Khor	16,347	60.99 / 100	63 / 100	▲0.01	▼13.77	21.98%
Hong Kah North SMC	1	28,046	403	Progress Singapore Party	Gigene Wong	10,457	39.01 / 100	37 / 100	▼0.01	▲13.77	21.98%
Hougang SMC	1	26,432	272	Workers' Party	Dennis Tan	15,451	61.21 / 100	58 / 100	▲0.02	▲3.52	22.42%
Hougang SMC	1	26,432	272	People's Action Party	Lee Hong Chuang	9,791	38.79 / 100	42 / 100	▼0.02	▼3.52	22.42%
Kebun Baru SMC	1	22,623	387	People's Action Party	Henry Kwek	13,309	62.92 / 100	68 / 100	▼0.05	N/A	25.84%
Kebun Baru SMC	1	22,623	387	Progress Singapore Party	Kumaran Pillai	7,842	37.08 / 100	32 / 100	▲0.05	N/A	25.84%
MacPherson SMC	1	28,513	625	People's Action Party	Tin Pei Ling	19,009	71.74 / 100	73 / 100	Steady	▲6.16	43.48%
MacPherson SMC	1	28,513	625	People's Power Party	Goh Meng Seng	7,489	28.26 / 100	27 / 100	Steady	N/A	43.48%
Marymount SMC	1	23,431	305	People's Action Party	Gan Siow Huang	12,173	55.04 / 100	54 / 100	Steady	N/A	10.08%
Marymount SMC	1	23,431	305	Progress Singapore Party	Ang Yong Guan	9,943	44.96 / 100	46 / 100	Steady	N/A	10.08%
Mountbatten SMC	1	24,246	589	People's Action Party	Lim Biow Chuan	16,285	73.82 / 100	75 / 100	▼0.02	▲1.96	47.64%
Mountbatten SMC	1	24,246	589	Peoples Voice	Sivakumaran Chellappa	5,775	26.18 / 100	25 / 100	▲0.02	N/A	47.64%
Pioneer SMC	1	24,653	350	People's Action Party	Patrick Tay	14,593	62.00 / 100	66 / 100	▲0.02	▼14.34	26.78%
Pioneer SMC	1	24,653	350	Progress Singapore Party	Lim Cher Hong	8,289	35.22 / 100	32 / 100	▼0.02	N/A	26.78%
Pioneer SMC	1	24,653	350	Independent (loses $13,500 deposit)	Cheang Peng Wah	655	2.78 / 100	2 / 100	Steady	N/A	26.78%
Potong Pasir SMC	1	19,731	279	People's Action Party	Sitoh Yih Pin	11,264	60.67 / 100	61 / 100	▼0.02	▼5.74	21.34%
Potong Pasir SMC	1	19,731	279	Singapore People's Party	Jose Raymond	7,302	39.33 / 100	39 / 100	▲0.02	▲5.74	21.34%
Punggol West SMC	1	26,587	217	People's Action Party	Sun Xueling	15,655	60.98 / 100	65 / 100	▲0.01	N/A	21.96%
Punggol West SMC	1	26,587	217	Workers' Party	Tan Chen Chen	10,017	39.02 / 100	35 / 100	▼0.01	N/A	21.96%
Radin Mas SMC	1	24,931	818	People's Action Party	Melvin Yong	16,864	74.01 / 100	76 / 100	▼0.02	▼3.24	48.02%
Radin Mas SMC	1	24,931	818	Reform Party	Kumar Appavoo	5,922	25.99 / 100	24 / 100	▲	▲3.24	48.02%
Yio Chu Kang SMC	1	25,962	413	People's Action Party	Yip Hon Weng	14,775	60.82 / 100	61 / 100	▼0.01	N/A	21.64%
Yio Chu Kang SMC	1	25,962	413	Progress Singapore Party	Kayla Low	9,519	39.18 / 100	39 / 100	▲0.01	N/A	21.64%
Yuhua SMC	1	21,351	406	People's Action Party	Grace Fu	14,131	70.54 / 100	69 / 100	Steady	▼3.00	41.08%
Yuhua SMC	1	21,351	406	Singapore Democratic Party	Robin Low	5,901	29.46 / 100	31 / 100	Steady	▲3.00	41.08%
Bishan–Toa Payoh GRC	4	101,220	2,049	People's Action Party	Ng Eng Hen; Chee Hong Tat; Chong Kee Hiong; Saktiandi Supaat	62,983	67.23 / 100	67 / 100	▼0.03	▼6.36	34.46%
Bishan–Toa Payoh GRC	4	101,220	2,049	Singapore People's Party	Steve Chia; Williamson Lee; Melvyn Chiu; Osman Sulaiman	30,696	32.77 / 100	33 / 100	▲0.03	▲6.36	34.46%
Chua Chu Kang GRC	4	106,632	1,410	People's Action Party	Gan Kim Yong; Low Yen Ling; Don Wee; Zhulkarnain Abdul Rahim	59,554	58.64 / 100	59 / 100	Steady	▼18.25	17.28%
Chua Chu Kang GRC	4	106,632	1,410	Progress Singapore Party	Francis Yuen; Abdul Rahman Mohamad; Tan Meng Wah; Choo Shaun Ming	42,012	41.36 / 100	41 / 100	Steady	N/A	17.28%
Holland–Bukit Timah GRC	4	114,973	1,999	People's Action Party	Vivian Balakrishnan; Sim Ann; Christopher de Souza; Edward Chia	71,218	66.36 / 100	68 / 100	Steady	▼0.24	32.72%
Holland–Bukit Timah GRC	4	114,973	1,999	Singapore Democratic Party	Tan Jee Say; James Gomez; Min Cheong; Alfred Tan	36,100	33.64 / 100	32 / 100	Steady	▲0.24	32.72%
Jalan Besar GRC	4	107,720	2,948	People's Action Party	Josephine Teo; Heng Chee How; Denise Phua; Wan Rizal	64,631	65.36 / 100	67 / 100	▼0.01	▼2.37	30.72%
Jalan Besar GRC	4	107,720	2,948	Peoples Voice	Lim Tean; Michael Fang Amin; Leong Sze Hian; Nor Azlan Sulaiman	34,261	34.64 / 100	33 / 100	▲0.01	N/A	30.72%
Marsiling–Yew Tee GRC	4	117,077	2,097	People's Action Party	Lawrence Wong; Alex Yam; Zaqy Mohamad; Hany Soh	69,813	63.18 / 100	64 / 100	Steady	▼5.55	26.36%
Marsiling–Yew Tee GRC	4	117,077	2,097	Singapore Democratic Party	Benjamin Pwee; Bryan Lim; Damanhuri Abas; Khung Wai Yeen	40,690	36.82 / 100	36 / 100	Steady	▲5.55	26.36%
Sengkang GRC	4	120,100	1,194	Workers' Party	He Ting Ru; Louis Chua; Jamus Lim; Raeesah Khan	60,217	52.12 / 100	53 / 100	▼0.01	N/A	4.24%
Sengkang GRC	4	120,100	1,194	People's Action Party	Ng Chee Meng; Lam Pin Min; Amrin Amin; Raymond Lye	55,319	47.88 / 100	47 / 100	▲0.01	N/A	4.24%
Aljunied GRC	5	150,821	1,582	Workers' Party	Pritam Singh; Sylvia Lim; Faisal Manap; Gerald Giam; Leon Perera	85,815	59.95 / 100	60 / 100	▲0.02	▲8.99	19.90%
Aljunied GRC	5	150,821	1,582	People's Action Party	Victor Lye; Alex Yeo; Chan Hui Yuh; Chua Eng Leong; Shamsul Kamar	57,330	40.05 / 100	40 / 100	▼0.02	▼8.99	19.90%
Ang Mo Kio GRC	5	185,261	5,016	People's Action Party	Lee Hsien Loong; Darryl David; Gan Thiam Poh; Ng Ling Ling; Nadia Ahmad Samdin	124,597	71.91 / 100	72 / 100	Steady	▼6.72	43.82%
Ang Mo Kio GRC	5	185,261	5,016	Reform Party	Kenneth Jeyaretnam; Charles Yeo; Andy Zhu; Noraini Yunus; Darren Soh	48,677	28.09 / 100	28 / 100	Steady	▲6.72	43.82%
East Coast GRC	5	121,644	1,393	People's Action Party	Heng Swee Keat; Maliki Osman; Tan Kiat How; Cheryl Chan; Jessica Tan	61,144	53.39 / 100	54 / 100	▼0.02	▼7.34	6.78%
East Coast GRC	5	121,644	1,393	Workers' Party	Nicole Seah; Kenneth Foo; Dylan Ng; Abdul Shariff Aboo Kassim; Terence Tan	53,375	46.61 / 100	46 / 100	▲0.02	▲7.34	6.78%
Jurong GRC	5	131,058	2,519	People's Action Party	Tharman Shanmugaratnam; Tan Wu Meng; Rahayu Mahzam; Shawn Huang; Xie Yao Quan	91,846	74.61 / 100	75 / 100	▼0.01	▼4.67	49.22%
Jurong GRC	5	131,058	2,519	Red Dot United	Michelle Lee Juen; Ravi Philemon; Nicholas Tang; Liyana Dhamirah; Alec Tok	31,260	25.39 / 100	25 / 100	▲0.01	N/A	49.22%
Marine Parade GRC	5	139,622	1,789	People's Action Party	Tan Chuan-Jin; Edwin Tong; Seah Kian Peng; Tan See Leng; Mohd Fahmi Aliman	75,203	57.74 / 100	57 / 100	▼0.02	▼6.33	15.52%
Marine Parade GRC	5	139,622	1,789	Workers' Party	Yee Jenn Jong; Ron Tan; Nathaniel Koh; Fadli Fawzi; Muhammad Azhar Bin Abdul Latip	55,047	42.26 / 100	43 / 100	▲0.02	▲6.33	15.52%
Nee Soon GRC	5	146,902	2,200	People's Action Party	K. Shanmugam; Carrie Tan; Derrick Goh; Louis Ng; Muhammad Faishal Ibrahim	86,308	61.90 / 100	61 / 100	Steady	▼4.93	23.80%
Nee Soon GRC	5	146,902	2,200	Progress Singapore Party	Kala Manickam; Taufik Supan; Bradley Bowyer; Sri Nallakaruppan; Damien Tay	53,131	38.10 / 100	39 / 100	Steady	N/A	23.80%
Pasir Ris–Punggol GRC	5	166,556	3,395	People's Action Party	Teo Chee Hean; Janil Puthucheary; Sharael Taha; Yeo Wan Ling; Desmond Tan	100,932	64.16 / 100	63 / 100	▲0.01	▼8.73	40.49%
Pasir Ris–Punggol GRC	5	166,556	3,395	Singapore Democratic Alliance	Desmond Lim; Abu Mohamed; Harminder Pal Singh; Kelvin Ong; Kuswadi Atnawi	37,237	23.67 / 100	25 / 100	Steady	▼3.44	40.49%
Pasir Ris–Punggol GRC	5	166,556	3,395	Peoples Voice (loses $67,500 deposit)	Jireh Lim; Prabu Ramachandran; Mohamed Nassir Ismail; Gilbert Goh; Vigneswari Ramachandran	19,147	12.17 / 100	12 / 100	▼0.01	N/A	40.49%
Sembawang GRC	5	147,786	2,948	People's Action Party	Ong Ye Kung; Vikram Nair; Lim Wee Kiak; Poh Li San; Mariam Jaafar	94,176	67.29 / 100	69 / 100	Steady	▼4.99	34.58%
Sembawang GRC	5	147,786	2,948	National Solidarity Party	Spencer Ng; Sebastian Teo; Sathin Ravindran; Ivan Yeo; Yadzeth Hairis	45,778	32.71 / 100	31 / 100	Steady	▲4.99	34.58%
Tampines GRC	5	151,589	3,521	People's Action Party	Masagos Zulkifli; Baey Yam Keng; Desmond Choo; Cheng Li Hui; Koh Poh Koon	94,668	66.41 / 100	67 / 100	Steady	▼5.65	32.82%
Tampines GRC	5	151,589	3,521	National Solidarity Party	Reno Fong; Mohd Ridzwan Mohammad; Yeo Ren-Yuan; Choong Hon Heng; Vincent Ng	47,875	33.59 / 100	33 / 100	Steady	▲5.65	32.82%
Tanjong Pagar GRC	5	134,494	1,933	People's Action Party	Chan Chun Sing; Indranee Rajah; Joan Pereira; Eric Chua; Alvin Tan	78,330	63.10 / 100	63 / 100	▼0.03	▼14.61	26.20%
Tanjong Pagar GRC	5	134,494	1,933	Progress Singapore Party	Wendy Low; Harish Pillay; Michael Chua Teck Leong; A’bas Kasmani; Terence Soon	45,807	36.90 / 100	37 / 100	▲0.03	▲14.61	26.20%
West Coast GRC	5	146,089	1,646	People's Action Party	S. Iswaran; Desmond Lee; Foo Mee Har; Rachel Ong; Ang Wei Neng	71,658	51.68 / 100	52 / 100	▼0.01	▼26.89	3.36%
West Coast GRC	5	146,089	1,646	Progress Singapore Party	Tan Cheng Bock; Leong Mun Wai (Note: Elected as NCMP.); Hazel Poa; Nadarajah Loganathan; Jeffrey Khoo	66,996	48.32 / 100	48 / 100	▲0.01	N/A	3.36%

=== By Community Development Councils ===
With regards to Community Development Councils (CDCs), the PAP maintained a strong foothold in the Central CDC, capturing 66.6% of the valid votes. This success was largely driven by heavy-hitting constituencies like Ang Mo Kio GRC, the stronghold of Prime Minister Lee Hsien Loong. In contrast, the WP mounted a fierce challenge in North East CDC, with the PAP's vote share there dipping to 54.8%, while the WP claimed 28.1%. Together, the Central and North East CDCs represented the largest electorate block during the election, accounting for 44 out of the 93 available parliamentary seats (47%).

The PAP's weaker showing in the North East dragged down its national average, causing its nationwide vote share to fall to 61.2%. However, strong performances in the west kept the ruling party's national numbers from dropping further. The PAP secured 64.0% of the vote in the North West CDC and 61.4% in the South West CDC, compared to a lower 58.5% in the South East CDC. While the PSP mounted a fierce challenge and nearly captured West Coast GRC, the bulk of its electoral support came from contested areas outside the North and South West regions. This ultimately allowed the PAP to maintain its critical 60% baseline across the western half of the country.

==== Votes polled ====
CDC				
CDC	PAP	WP	PSP	Others
Central	66.6%		12.2%	21.2%
North East	54.8%	28.1%		17.1%
North West	64.0%		10.0%	26.0%
South East	58.5%	37.0%		4.5%
South West	61.4%		27.7%	11.0%
TOTAL	61.2%	11.2%	10.2%	17.4%

==== Seats won ====
CDC	Seats				
CDC	Seats	PAP	WP	PSP	Others
Central	23	23		0	0
North East	21	11	10		0
North West	19	19		0	0
South East	12	12	0		0
South West	18	18		0	0
TOTAL	93	83	10	0	0

=== Analysis ===
B/C = Constituency has experienced a boundary change since the last election.

==== Top 10 performing constituencies for the PAP ====
- Constituencies with no comparison to 2015 were due to them being new constituencies.

#	Constituency	People's Action Party			Opposition			
#	Constituency	Votes	%	Swing	Party	Votes	%	Swing
1	Jurong GRC	91,846	74.61%	▼4.67%	Red Dot United	31,260	25.39%	New
2	Radin Mas SMC	16,864	74.01%	▼3.24%	Reform Party	5,922	25.99%	▲13.27%
3	Mountbatten SMC	16,285	73.82%	▲1.96%	Peoples Voice	5,775	26.18%	New
4	Ang Mo Kio GRC	124,597	71.91%	▼6.73%	Reform Party	48,677	28.09%	▲6.73%
5	MacPherson SMC	19,009	71.74%	▲6.16%	People's Power Party	7,489	28.26%	New
6	Yuhua SMC	14,131	70.54%	▼3.01%	Singapore Democratic Party	5,901	29.46%	▲3.01%
7	Sembawang GRC	94,176	67.29%	▼4.99%	National Solidarity Party	45,778	32.71%	▲4.99%
8	Bishan-Toa Payoh GRC	62,983	67.23%	▼6.36%	Singapore People's Party	30,696	32.77%	▲6.36%
9	Tampines GRC	94,668	66.41%	▼5.66%	National Solidarity Party	47,875	33.59%	▲5.66%
10	Holland–Bukit Timah GRC	71,218	66.36%	▼0.26%	Singapore Democratic Party	36,100	33.64%	▲0.26%

==== Top 10 best opposition performers ====
- Constituencies with no comparison to 2015 were due to them being new constituencies.

#	Constituency	Opposition				People's Action Party		
#	Constituency	Votes	%	Swing	Party	Votes	%	Swing
1	Hougang SMC	15,451	61.21%	▲3.52%	Workers' Party	9,791	38.79%	▼3.52%
2	Aljunied GRC	85,815	59.95%	▲8.99%	Workers' Party	57,330	40.05%	▼8.99%
3	Sengkang GRC	60,217	52.12%	New	Workers' Party	55,319	47.88%	New
4	West Coast GRC	66,996	48.32%	New	Progress Singapore Party	71,658	51.68%	▼26.89%
5	East Coast GRC	53,375	46.61%	▲7.34%	Workers' Party	61,114	53.39%	▼7.34%
6	Bukit Panjang SMC	15,576	46.27%	▲14.65%	Singapore Democratic Party	18,085	53.73%	▼14.65%
7	Bukit Batok SMC	12,787	45.20%	▲6.43%	Singapore Democratic Party	15,500	54.80%	▼6.43%
8	Marymount SMC	9,943	44.96%	New	Progress Singapore Party	12,173	55.04%	New
9	Marine Parade GRC	55,047	42.26%	▲6.33%	Workers' Party	75,203	57.74%	▼6.33%
10	Chua Chu Kang GRC	42,012	41.36%	▲18.27%	Progress Singapore Party	59,554	58.64%	▼18.27%

==== Top PAP swings ====
#	Constituency	2015 %	2020 %	Swing
1	West Coast GRC	78.57%	51.68%	▼26.89%
2	Chua Chu Kang GRC	76.91%	58.64%	▼18.25%
3	Bukit Batok SMC	73.02% (Note: The PAP retained Bukit Batok SMC with a 61.23% vote share to SDP's 38.77% during the 2016 by-election, which would saw a swing of 6.43% if the by-election result is compared to this election. The SDP's swing would have placed fifth in the top party swings table.)	54.80%	▼18.22%
4	Bukit Panjang SMC	68.38%	53.73%	▼14.65%
5	Tanjong Pagar GRC	77.71%	63.10%	▼14.61%
6	Pioneer SMC	76.35%	62.00%	▼14.35%
7	Hong Kah North SMC	74.76%	60.99%	▼13.77%
8	Aljunied GRC	49.04%	40.05%	▼8.99%
9	Pasir Ris-Punggol GRC	72.89%	64.16%	▼8.73%
10	East Coast GRC	60.73%	53.39%	▼7.34%

==== Top party swings ====
- The list will contain only the opposition parties that have challenged the same constituency in the 2015 election, and may be compared with 2015 results as they existed in both elections, although most had changes in their electoral boundaries.

#	Party	Constituency	2015 %	2020 %	Swing
1	Singapore Democratic Party	Bukit Batok SMC	26.38%	45.20%	▲18.82%
2	Singapore Democratic Party	Bukit Panjang SMC	31.62%	46.27%	▲14.65%
3	Workers' Party	Aljunied GRC	50.96%	59.95%	▲8.99%
4	Workers' Party	East Coast GRC	39.27%	46.61%	▲7.34%
5	Reform Party	Ang Mo Kio GRC	21.36%	28.09%	▲6.72%
6	Singapore People's Party	Bishan-Toa Payoh GRC	26.41%	32.77%	▲6.36%
7	Workers' Party	Marine Parade GRC	35.93%	42.26%	▲6.33%
8	Singapore People's Party	Potong Pasir SMC	33.61%	39.33%	▲5.74%
9	National Solidarity Party	Tampines GRC	27.93%	33.59%	▲5.65%
10	Singapore Democratic Party	Marsiling-Yew Tee GRC	31.27%	36.82%	▲5.55%

==== Sample count accuracies ====
- Vote counts below are for votes cast in Singapore only and exclude votes cast overseas. While most constituencies had accuracies that fall within the 4% margin of error (at a 95% confidence interval), there are only three constituencies that had accuracies off above 4%, which are indicated in red text.

#	Constituency	People's Action Party			Opposition			
#	Constituency	Actual %	Sample %	Accuracy	Party	Actual %	Sample %	Accuracy
1	Aljunied GRC	40.07%	40%	▲0.07%	Workers' Party	59.93%	60%	▼0.07%
2	Ang Mo Kio GRC	71.91%	72%	▼0.09%	Reform Party	28.09%	28%	▲0.09%
3	Tanjong Pagar GRC	63.13%	63%	▲0.13%	Progress Singapore Party	36.87%	37%	▼0.13%
4	Yio Chu Kang SMC	60.83%	61%	▼0.17%	Progress Singapore Party	38.17%	38%	▲0.17%
5	Bishan-Toa Payoh GRC	67.26%	67%	▲0.26%	Singapore People's Party	32.74%	33%	▼0.26%
6	Potong Pasir SMC	60.69%	61%	▼0.31%	Singapore People's Party	39.31%	39%	▲0.31%
7	West Coast GRC	51.69%	52%	▼0.31%	Progress Singapore Party	48.31%	48%	▲0.31%
8	Chua Chu Kang GRC	58.64%	59%	▼0.36%	Progress Singapore Party	41.36%	41%	▲0.36%
9	Jurong GRC	74.62%	75%	▼0.38%	Red Dot United	25.38%	25%	▲0.38%
10	East Coast GRC	53.41%	54%	▼0.59%	Workers' Party	46.59%	46%	▲0.59%
11	Tampines GRC	66.41%	67%	▼0.59%	National Solidarity Party	33.59%	33%	▲0.59%
12	Marine Parade GRC	57.76%	57%	▲0.76%	Workers' Party	42.24%	43%	▼0.76%
13	Marsiling-Yew Tee GRC	63.18%	64%	▼0.82%	Singapore Democratic Party	36.82%	36%	▲0.82%
14	Sengkang GRC	47.87%	47%	▲0.87%	Workers' Party	52.13%	53%	▼0.87%
15	Nee Soon GRC	61.90%	61%	▲0.90%	Progress Singapore Party	38.10%	39%	▼0.90%
16	Marymount SMC	55.04%	54%	▲1.04%	Progress Singapore Party	44.96%	46%	▼1.04%
17	Pasir Ris-Punggol GRC	64.15%	63%	▲1.15%	Singapore Democratic Alliance	23.67%	25%	▼1.33%
17	Pasir Ris-Punggol GRC	64.15%	63%	▲1.15%	Peoples Voice	12.18%	12%	▲0.18%
18	Mountbatten SMC	73.84%	75%	▼1.16%	Peoples Voice	26.16%	25%	▲1.16%
19	MacPherson SMC	71.74%	73%	▼1.26%	People's Power Party	28.26%	27%	▲1.26%
20	Yuhua SMC	70.54%	69%	▲1.54%	Singapore Democratic Party	29.46%	31%	▼1.54%
21	Jalan Besar GRC	65.37%	67%	▼1.63%	Peoples Voice	34.63%	33%	▲1.63%
22	Holland-Bukit Timah GRC	66.36%	68%	▼1.64%	Singapore Democratic Party	33.64%	32%	▲1.64%
23	Sembawang GRC	67.29%	69%	▼1.71%	National Solidarity Party	32.71%	31%	▲1.71%
24	Radin Mas SMC	74.03%	76%	▼1.96%	Reform Party	25.97%	24%	▲1.96%
25	Hong Kah North SMC	60.98%	63%	▼2.02%	Progress Singapore Party	39.02%	37%	▲2.02%
26	Bukit Batok SMC	54.80%	57%	▼2.20%	Singapore Democratic Party	45.20%	43%	▲2.20%
27	Bukit Panjang SMC	53.74%	56%	▼2.26%	Singapore Democratic Party	46.26%	44%	▲2.26%
28	Hougang SMC	38.81%	42%	▼3.19%	Workers' Party	61.19%	58%	▲3.19%
29	Pioneer SMC	61.98%	66%	▼4.02%	Progress Singapore Party	35.24%	32%	▲3.24%
29	Pioneer SMC	61.98%	66%	▼4.02%	Independent candidate	2.78%	2%	▲0.78%
30	Punggol West SMC	60.97%	65%	▼4.03%	Workers' Party	39.03%	35%	▲4.03%
31	Kebun Baru SMC	62.97%	68%	▼5.03%	Progress Singapore Party	37.03%	32%	▲5.03%

== Post-election events ==
=== PAP's response ===
In a press conference held in the early hours of 11 July following the results, Prime Minister Lee described PAP's 61.24% of the popular vote as "respectable" and reflected "broad-based support for the PAP" but "was not as strong a mandate as [he] had hoped for". He pledged to use the "clear mandate" responsibly to take Singapore "safely through the (COVID-19) crisis and beyond". Lee also acknowledged that there was a "clear desire" for alternative voices in parliament especially from young and first time voters and called the loss of three incumbent office holders in Sengkang as a "major loss" to his team. In an unprecedented move, Lee announced that Workers' Party leader Pritam Singh would be designated as the official Leader of the Opposition and "will be provided with appropriate staff support and resources" to perform his role. Lee added that 24 newly elected first-time PAP MPs will "reinforce the renewal process" of the party. Lee added that he was "determined" to hand over to a new team of leaders in good working order after the COVID-19 crisis is overcome. Finally, PM Lee also suggested that disruption caused by the "circuit breaker" and the safe distancing restrictions just before the election which led to loss of income and jobs was reflected in the results.

PM Lee added that a thorough review into the conduct of the election would take place, acknowledging that the arrangements "could have been done better" following the reports of long queues at polling stations caused by additional arrangements for COVID-19.

Speaking later in the day while thanking voters with his successful GRC team in Nee Soon GRC, Law and Home Affairs Minister K. Shanmugam said "a lot of soul searching and reflection" would be required to understand the message sent by the voters in the swing against PAP. When asked on his view of the PAP statement which questioned Sengkang GRC WP candidate Raeesah Khan of whether she was "worthy of consideration as an MP" which was said to have backfired and resulted in a WP victory, Shanmugam suggested that the older generation of Singaporeans takes a different approach with the younger generation of how race and religion is discussed in Singapore. Shanmugam added there "needs to be a way in which the viewpoints of younger Singaporeans" are addressed. In a radio interview with Money FM 89.3 on 28 July, he mentioned that the results reflected the strain in the economy amid COVID-19, and adding that he was keenly aware of the voters' desire, especially younger ones, for diversity of representation in Parliament, with a difference between perception and reality.

Former prime minister Goh Chok Tong called PAP's victory a "clear mandate" and called PM Lee's move to designate Pritam Singh as official leader of the opposition a "very significant move". He added opposition MPs and NCMPs will now have to "go beyond merely serving as a check-and-balance" and "put forward their alternative policies and solutions" to Singaporeans.

On 17 July, Lawrence Wong mentioned on a separate virtual conference for the multi-task force relating to the social distancing in Hougang Avenue 5 after the polling hours ended that featured a large group of WP supporters making close contacts despite wearing masks and safe distancing, which produced a safe-distancing risks by individuals. Wong told that Singaporeans should not be complacent and added a warning that "anyone decides to abandon caution, thinks that, 'It's okay'" could "put the whole country at risk". Despite the warning, however, there was no change in the enforcement and Wong believed that polling was conducted in open spaces and there was no close contact in terms of touching and talking, and had arranged voters different safety protocols while they cast their votes.

On 19 July, Senior Minister and Co-ordinating Minister for Social Policies Tharman Shanmugaratnam mentioned that the politics had been changed permanently after the election, one with a solid mandate and one for a changing electorate, adding a fact on the results that "were also good for opposition politics", especially the performance for the WP and "reflected a discerning public and a political culture that bodes well for Singapore." Tharman aimed to achieve the balance and having a "vigorous and informed" debate between PAP and the oppositions in the upcoming government to improve efficiency and democracy.

=== Opposition parties' response ===
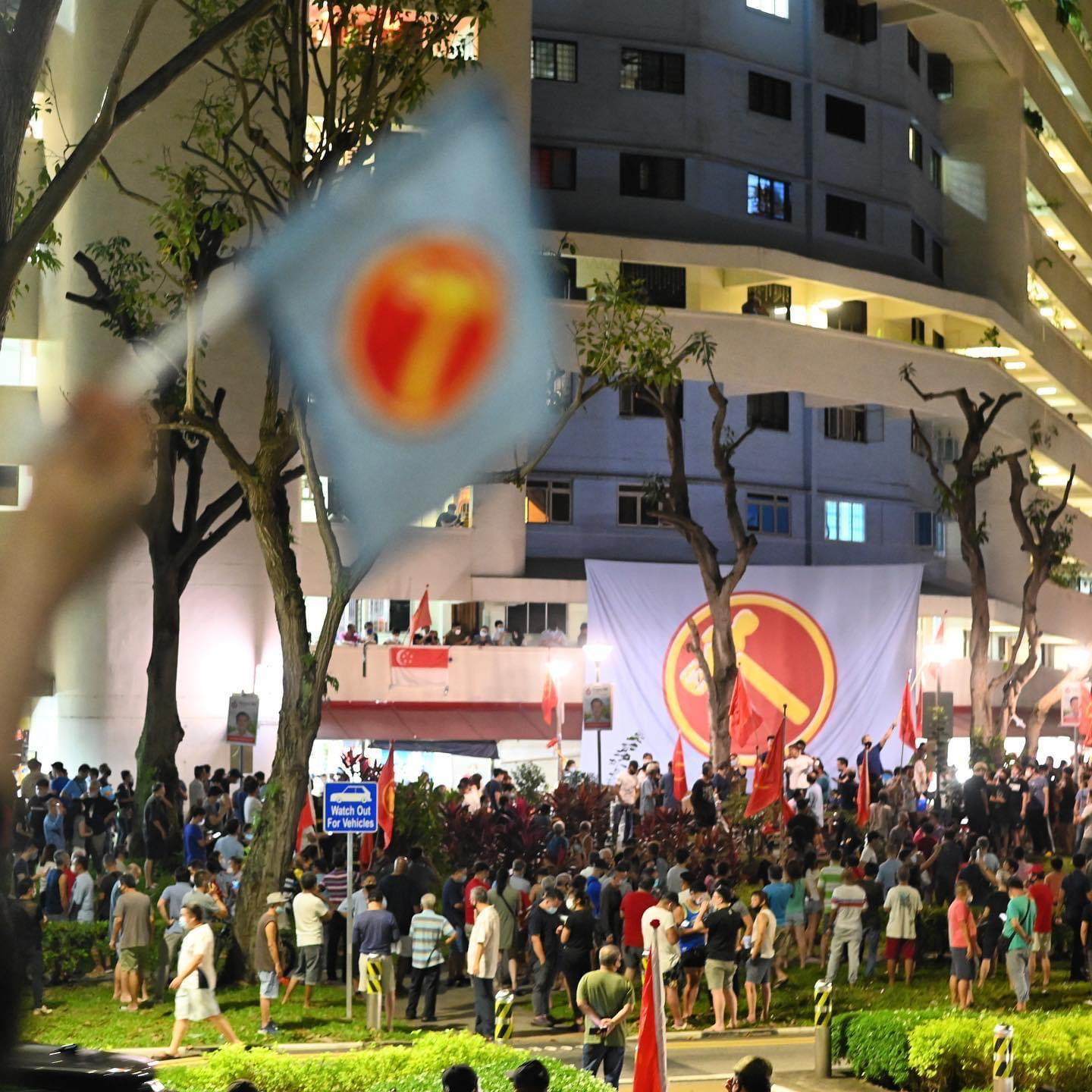
Workers' Party (WP) supporters at Hougang Avenue 5 celebrated the party's results on the night of election day, an action that according to Wong in a separate virtual conference on 17 July, had contravened social distancing measures.

Workers' Party leader Pritam Singh said he was "grateful" and "humbled" at the support WP received, adding that he was "not feeling euphoric at all" and acknowledged "a lot of work to do". He reminded the successful candidates to keep their feet "firmly grounded" after the WP secured a second GRC in Sengkang and held onto Aljunied and Hougang with increased margins. In a Facebook post, he wrote that he looked forward to doing his best serving as leader of the opposition.

Progress Singapore Party leader Tan Cheng Bock said he was proud that his party achieved an average vote share of 40.85% in the seats it contested on their maiden election despite being founded a year prior. He called it "the beginning of a new chapter for PSP", and believes the "movement" that he created will grow. He added that the party executive committee will discuss sending two candidates from West Coast GRC to serve the NCMP role in Parliament.

Singapore Democratic Party leader Chee Soon Juan said the SDP ran a "very good campaign" focused on policies and issues but "came up short" on winning. He thanked voters and said the SDP "will continue to press on". SDP chairman Paul Tambyah added they could "hold (their) heads high for a strong campaign under the circumstances" and "will do better the next time". Tambyah accused the PAP government of "recklessness and opportunism" for holding the election during a pandemic, and also called the long queues of voters due to the requirement to wear gloves when casting ballots and lack of personal protective equipment for polling agents when voters on stay home orders came to vote as a "fiasco".

=== NCMP allocation ===
Under the current constitution, opposition will be guaranteed 12 parliamentary seats which may consist of elected members of parliament (MP) from the opposition team and unsuccessful candidates in this election from the best-performing losing opposition party or parties. The number of NCMPs offered will be 12 less the number of elected MPs; there are 10 opposition-elects and thus two NCMPs will be offered after the election. Additional rules also states there could be up to two NCMPs from the best performing GRC and one from the best performing SMC.

Since the Progress Singapore Party (PSP) team led by Tan Cheng Bock contesting in the West Coast GRC were the best-performing losing opposition team by garnering 48.31% of valid votes, both NCMPs seats were offered to PSP. On 14 July, PSP announced that Hazel Poa and Leong Mun Wai will take up the two NCMP positions, making them the third and fourth NCMPs that were not from WP, and a parliament with three parties representing since the 12th Parliament. Leong and Poa's election as NCMPs were finalised by the Returning Officer Tan on 16 July.

=== Election Department responses ===
On 14 July, Koh Siong Ling, the head of the Election Department, issued an apology to the public and senior voters, while conducting a review on what went wrong during the election, such as long queues during voting in the early morning hours (a timing block reserved for senior voters) unlike previous elections, and the queues which was likely caused by an unnecessary, additional step on equipping disposable gloves, as voters had sanitised their hands a few times prior. ELD also acknowledged the procedures needed to ensure safety of the voters while revealed that they have removed a mandatory step on wearing gloves in the midst of election and there were difficulties experienced by voters on its station layout, though revealed that the queues were mostly improved by 2 pm and the extension of polling hours, despite adopting safe distancing practices. ELD also reviewed that 13 voters who were still serving the Stay-Home Notice did not vote that day due to the duration.

On 15 July, ELD revealed that a technical glitch had occurred in one of the voting centres for Holland-Bukit Timah GRC. A voter had reported being unable to vote due to the system stating that she had already cast her vote prior. The case was escalated to the assistant returning officer and the police. Investigations revealed human error had resulted in the e-registration system being inadvertently logged out which prevented the registration of her NRIC into the system. ELD subsequently apologised to the voter over the mishap and allowed her to restore her name while exempting the $50 payment fee.

=== Overseas voting ===
At about 11:40 pm on 15 July, Elections Department published a report for overseas votes. The turnout was 4,794, or 72.97% out of the 6,570 voters in total, bringing the overall turnout to 2,540,359 and its percentage to 95.81%. Excluding the 50 spoilt/invalid votes, only 2,710 voters had voted in favour for PAP but percentages for the majority of the constituencies were in favour towards the opposition except for six (Hong Kah North SMC, Pasir Ris-Punggol GRC, Pioneer SMC, Potong Pasir SMC, Punggol West SMC and Sengkang GRC). While the percentages for the 10 constituencies (Ang Mo Kio GRC, Bukit Batok SMC, Chua Chu Kang GRC, Holland-Bukit Timah GRC, Marsiling-Yew Tee GRC, Marymount SMC, Nee Soon GRC, Sembawang GRC, Tampines GRC and Yuhua SMC) were not affected, the PAP's vote share fell to 61.23%. The vote counting was held inside the Elections Department Training Centre at Victoria Street under the witness of most Workers' Party candidates.

=== Fifth Lee Hsien Loong cabinet ===
The new cabinet was announced on a live televised announcement held in The Istana by Prime Minister Lee on Saturday, 25 July at 2:30 pm on his Facebook page as well as CNA, CNA938 and YouTube. While most ministry portfolios from the last Parliament were unchanged, Deputy Prime Minister Heng Swee Keat was also conferred a brand new portfolio for Co-ordinating Minister for Economic Policies. Ong Ye Kung became the Transport Minister, Lawrence Wong became the Education Minister, Desmond Lee became the National Development Minister and is also given an additional new portfolio for Minister-in-charge of Social Service Integration; Masagos Zulkifli was appointed as a Social and Family Development Minister and a second minister for Health while relinquishing his Environment Ministry portfolio to Grace Fu (portfolio renaming to Ministry of Sustainability and the Environment); Indranee Rajah was given National Development portfolio while relinquishing Education and retained both her Prime Minister's Office and Finance portfolios. Lee mentioned that not changing most existing portfolios was to promote continuity and urging a need for experienced ministers to provide steady hands and mentoring the younger ministers, especially during the ongoing COVID-19 crisis.

Eight existing MPs were also promoted, among which Senior Ministers of State Edwin Tong and Maliki Osman were promoted to Cabinet ministers as Minister for Culture, Community and Youth and Second Minister for Law, and Minister in the Prime Minister's Office and Second Minister for Education and Foreign Affairs, respectively; Backbencher Rahayu Mahzam was promoted to Parliamentary Secretary in the Ministry of Health with effect on 1 September; Minister of State for Manpower Zaqy Mohamad promoting to a Senior Minister of State and also given the Defence portfolio; senior Parliamentary Secretaries Low Yen Ling, Faishal Ibrahim and Sun Xueling as Ministers of State while given new portfolios (Low as Culture, Community and Youth and Trade and Industry, Faishal as Home Affairs and National Development, and Sun as Education and Social and Family Development); and Alex Yam as the new mayor for North West Community Development Council replacing Teo Ho Pin.

While not announced live, other portfolios were changed for five existing Senior Ministers of State, among which Amy Khor relinquished her Health portfolio for Transport while retaining Sustainability and Environment, Sim Ann relinquished Culture, Community and Youth portfolio for National Development while retaining Communications and Information, Chee Hong Tat relinquishing both portfolios for Education and Trade and Industry for Foreign Affairs and Transport, Janil Puthucheary relinquishing Transport portfolio for Health while retaining Communications & Information, and Koh Poh Koon relinquishing Trade and Industry portfolio for Health. Additionally, Tan Wu Meng have relinquished his Senior Parliamentary Secretary portfolios (Foreign Affairs and Trade and Industry) and returned to a backbencher, while Baey Yam Keng relinquished his Culture, Community and Youth portfolio but retained his Transport ministry. The Co-ordinating Minister for Infrastructure did not announce its successor and thus became vacant.

Seven fresh MPs were promoted in the office, among which Tan See Leng become the third MP (after Heng and Richard Hu) to be directly promoted to a Cabinet Minister, taking on the portfolios for the Prime Minister's Office and Second Minister for Manpower and Trade and Industry; four were given Minister of State portfolios, namely Gan Siow Huang (Education and Manpower), Alvin Tan (Culture, Community and Youth and Trade and Industry), Desmond Tan (Home Affairs and Sustainability and Environment) and Tan Kiat How (Prime Minister's Office and National Development); Eric Chua promoting as a Parliamentary Secretary in the Ministry of Culture, Community and Youth and Social and Family Development with effect on 1 September; and Mohd Fahmi Aliman as the new mayor for South East Community Development Council replacing Maliki.

A total of 37 MPs out of 93 were office holders, the same number that comprises the previous cabinet; they were inaugurated two days later on 27 July at separate venues in Parliament House and in The Istana due to safe distancing, a first in Singapore's history the inauguration were held at multiple venues. (Note: Selected international guests and ASEAN ambassadors, members of parliaments, former political holders, key government personnel, Chief Justice of Singapore Sundaresh Menon, former President of Singapore Tony Tan and his wife Mary Chee were present in the Istana. Ministers sworn at the Istana were Senior Minister Tharman Shanmugaratnam, cabinet ministers Indranee Rajah, Grace Fu, Maliki Osman, Ng Eng Hen, Ong Ye Kung, S Iswaran, Tan See Leng, Josephine Teo and Lawrence Wong; and Ministers of State Gan Siow Huang, Low Yen Ling, Amy Khor, Koh Poh Koon, Tan Kiat How and Sun Xueling.) (Note: Guests attending at the Parliament House separately went through a live video feed to watch the broadcast and had the ceremony conducted as usual under instruction. Known ministers sworn at the Parliament House were Deputy Prime Minister Heng Swee Keat, Senior Minister Teo Chee Hean, cabinet ministers Chan Chun Sing, Gan Kim Yong, K Shanmugam, Desmond Lee, Masagos Zulkifli, Edwin Tong and Vivian Balakrishnan; and Ministers of State Sim Ann, Chee Hong Tat, Faishal Ibrahim, Heng Chee How, Janil Puthucheary, Desmond Tan and Zaqy Mohamad.) (Note: Baey Yam Keng and Eric Chua were separately inaugurated at the Istana on 3 August.) Finally, Prime Minister Lee announced that the annual National Day Rally will be cancelled but will instead deliver his speech when the Parliament opens a month later on 24 August.

The following day, while Foreign Minister Vivian Balakrishnan held a meeting with Malaysian Foreign Minister Hishammudin Hussein at the Johor–Singapore Causeway, he mentioned on a separate interview that the assembly of the upcoming cabinet was a "complete unity" that balanced the components of continuity, exposure and renewal, and endorses Heng's leadership for the "fourth-generation" (4G) cabinet.

All 10 WP MPs also observed the inauguration that day but fielded into two teams of five, with the Aljunied GRC team attending at The Istana, and Sengkang GRC and Dennis Tan at the Parliament House. The following day, PM Lee announced that Singh would be entitled to additional parliamentary privileges and doubling his annual MP salary to S$385,000 as the leader of the opposition. Lee mentioned on a speech that there was an emerging trend that "shown a strong desire among Singaporeans for a greater diversity of views in politics", and its purpose on adding the role added was to "maintaining our cohesion and sense of national purpose". Previously, the title as a leader of the opposition was unofficial and paid the same reimbursement as a regular MP. When parliament held its first session on 31 August, Parliament also moved a motion allowing Singh to have double time (40 minutes) on making speeches, and entitled to hiring three legislative assistants and one secretarial assistant, as opposed to backbencher's one. Although WP lack candidates required to form a Shadow Cabinet due to the supermajority, Singh told that they would be scrutinising five key areas that were heavily concerned with (health, ageing and retirement adequacy; jobs, businesses and the economy; education, inequality and the cost of living; housing, transport and infrastructure; and national sustainability). Singh also told while delivering his maiden speech on three things: certain things that changed in Singapore, things that must not change, and things that should change, while described Singapore as a "glass half-full that can be topped up".

On 20 August, the parliament confirmed Tan Chuan-Jin will reprise his role as a Speaker of Parliament, while Fu and Lee were replaced by Rajah and Zaqy respectively, as the new leader and deputy leader for the upcoming parliament. Puthucheary and Sim were also reprised in their roles as Party Whip and deputy Whip respectively. On 31 August, both Christopher de Souza and Jessica Tan were elected as Deputy Speakers, replacing Charles Chong and Lim Biow Chuan.

Separately, the Government Parliamentary Committees (GPCs) were also announced with Vikram Nair, Liang Eng Hwa and Seah Kian Peng reprising their chairman roles, while Tin Pei Ling replacing retiring MP Cedric Foo as the deputy chairman for the Communications and Information GPC, and Sitoh Yih Pin, Patrick Tay, Desmond Choo, Tan Wu Meng, Saktiandi Supaat and Louis Ng as chairmen for the GPCs for Culture, Community and Youth, Education, Manpower, Health, Transport and Sustainability and the Environment, respectively. Most other roles for the GPCs were left untouched.

The 14th parliament opened on 24 August at 8 pm SGT, and similar to the cabinet inauguration, also for the first time in Singapore history, the parliament opened on separate venues due to safe distancing, both on the Parliament House and The Arts House, the latter being the venue of the former Parliament House before 1999. According to Rajah's Facebook post on the eve of opening, the fifth COVID-19 budget statement by Heng a week prior on the 17th was meant "the best option" and ensuring MPs, businesses and workers proper clarification on the Government's plans before the opening. During the opening, President of Singapore Halimah Yacob mentioned on her address that the start of the term was "under the shadow of COVID-19" with the situation "remain grave for some time", while the rise of the fourth-generation (4G) cabinet was meant "to take Singapore the next steps forward". Speaker Tan mentioned that the 12-member opposition representation along with Singh's role as the Leader of the Opposition was meant for "contestation", but warned about "polarisation and division" which could cause short-termism and populism if triggered.

On 2 September, Prime Minister Lee revealed on a live broadcast message in Parliament on the decision to open the 14th Parliament early, due to the urgency on dealing COVID-19 and the economy, while praising the current situation on mitigating the infection rate and healthcare, and mentioned that implementing a "circuit breaker" for two months was a big move and was successful.

=== Town Council ===
The Ministry of National Development (MND) announced on 30 July that there were 17 town councils formed, with each town council formed from one GRC and at least one SMC in 11 out of 17 towns. Among which, Sengkang Town Council (SKTC) was brand new which was formed from the standalone Sengkang GRC, while 11 towns had changes in at least one of the areas due to redistricting and carving out divisions into SMCs, such as Ang Mo Kio Town Council (AMKTC) which was formed along with Kebun Baru SMC (transferred from Nee Soon Town Council (NSTC)) and Yio Chu Kang SMC, and Bishan-Toa Payoh Town Council (BTPTC) and Pasir Ris-Punggol Town Council (PRPTC) which were formed from its namesake GRCs and the newly carved Marymount SMC and Punggol West SMC, respectively. The boundaries for the five town councils were untouched from the last parliament term, namely Aljunied-Hougang (AHTC), East Coast-Fengshan (ECTC; renamed to East Coast), Holland-Bukit Panjang (HBPTC), Jurong-Clementi (JCTC) and Tanjong Pagar (TPTC), with the exception of East Coast GRC due to Fengshan SMC being absorbed into, four out of the five GRCs had experienced no boundary changes. 15 out of 17 towns were managed by PAP with the exception of AHTC and SKTC, which were managed by WP.

Under the Town Council Act, each town have until 28 October, 90 days from the date of the order issued, to effectively transfer services to the required towns applicable, though it can also mutually agree to an earlier date.

On 17 July, two weeks ahead of the announcement, He Ting Ru requested to manage their own Sengkang Town Council without any merging of other town councils as a chairwoman of the town council, and added that she also wrote to both AMKTC and PRPTC on 11 July to request a preliminary meeting to discuss the handover, as most of the divisions in Sengkang were under PRPTC in the last election, except Anchorvale, which is based on Sengkang West SMC (part of AMKTC).

On 20 July, a legal poser was also brought by the Pasir Ris-Punggol Town Council (PRPTC) citing that who would be the next plaintiff after the Sengkang ward was claimed by WP; SKTC contains a division (Rivervale) which was based on Punggol East SMC, a ward previously held by the WP between the 2013 by-election and the last election, and AHTC is currently facing a situation of civil lawsuit over a breach of duties and auditing problems worth over S$33 million, which WP had since lodged an appeal prior to the election. On 3 August, the High Court updated lawyer representatives for the AHTC applied amendments to the claims against previous town councillor Singh and four others in a case which was decided last year. The update found Singh and two others councillors, Kenneth Foo and Chua Zhi Hon, were in breach of their duties. According to Singh, the amended statement for which court approval was sought was meant to understand the proposed amendments, which Singh did not reply to a request for comment by press time. A hearing on the application was scheduled to be held in chambers before High Court Justice Ramesh Kannan that day. The defendants were notified by the High Court that the trial had ended and were given a judgement prior, as AHTC filed the lawsuit late in 2017, by then the town would have time to make the claims. In an oral judgment released by Justice Ramesh on 20 August, he mentioned the amendments that pertained to Singh, Chua and Foo were neither involved issues during the trial, and that amendment was sought to allow the three defendants to address any new claims, which is now before the Court of Appeal; however both lawsuits were tried but not consolidated. He ordered the parties to file submissions on costs within one week of the judgment.

On 22 August, the appeal was postponed under a request by He under SKTC to allow "sufficient time" to consider its legal status according to court papers, after she submitted a six-week adjournment on 10 August and explained references to the Town Councils (Declaration) Order 2020 and defended judgements of the court of appeal, added with sought of legal advice. The adjournment was approved by several law firms including the Davinder Singh Chambers.

=== Non-voter inspection and ballot boxes ===
Under the Parliamentary Elections Act, voting is compulsory, and registered voters who do not vote in an election are delisted from the Registrar of Electors at the end of voting. Including overseas voters, a total of 111,076 voters, comprising 4.19% of the whole 2,651,435 electors eligible, did not cast a vote on 10 July. Prior to polling day on 4 July, the Immigration and Checkpoints Authority announced that a system glitch rendered 101 overseas voters unable to vote, and that said voters could be reinstated for free.

On 5 October, the Election Department announced that the inspection of a list of non-voters was open to the public, and that non-voters could restore their names at any time until the issuance of the writ for the next election. A $50 fee must be paid for reinstatement following an election, but may be waived under approved reasons. The 350 voters who were quarantined on polling day were automatically reinstated.

Under the Act, all ballot boxes are sealed and guarded under maximum security inside the vault located at the Supreme Court within six months upon the first locking (in this case, until 16 January 2021), after which they are transported to Tuas South Incineration Plant for incineration. Only a judge of the Supreme Court may order that the sealed boxes be opened and their contents inspected during the six months, though it is to institute or maintain a prosecution or an application to invalidate an election.

While electors were allowed to inspect from the date onwards, voters in the 23rd polling district for Pasir Ris–Punggol GRC were unable to do so until 10 January 2021 as a copy of the Registrar of Electors had been sealed wrongly by an election officer. President Halimah Yacob approved the order of retrieving the document; while the ballot box was destroyed after the date, the destruction of the copy was delayed up till 9 February (maximum 30 days) upon its retrieval. The list for PN23 was made available on 25 January; both PAP and the Singapore Democratic Alliance (SDA) sent representatives to witness the event.

=== Post-election CEC election ===
On 8 November 2020, the 36th Central Executive Committee for the People's Action Party (PAP) was held. On an announcement, many members were re-elected in their roles, so were new members Edwin Tong, Alex Yam, Ng Chee Meng, and Victor Lye who were co-opted on 19 November. It also elected Desmond Lee and Grace Fu as Organising Secretaries, while Yam, Chee Hong Tat and Janil Puthucheary were elected as Assistant Organising Secretaries. The CEC also appointed Josephine Teo as the chair of the PAP's Women's Wing, Lee as the chair of the PAP Senior Group (PAP.SG), Puthucheary as the chair of the Young PAP (YP), and Lawrence Wong as the Advisor to PAP Policy Forum (PPF).

In a statement by Prime Minister and party's secretary-general Lee Hsien Loong, the change was meant to keep this cycle going for as long as possible and along with the prior election results. Lee noted on countries that have fiercely contested democratic systems but was not perfect, leading to contestation that often causes politics unstable and divided, with those in power focusing only on their own short-term political survival, and those out of power offering remedies without being upfront about the costs and consequences. Lee stated that the party will need to work even harder to build consensus and create the political space for the future of Singapore during a turbulent and uncertain future.

Similarly, Workers' Party (WP) also held a biennial CEC election on 27 December at Clarke Quay instead of the headquarters at Geylang. Party chairman Sylvia Lim and Secretary-General Pritam Singh were re-elected in their respective posts, so were elected MPs Faisal Manap, Gerald Giam, Leon Perera, Dennis Tan and former MPs Low Thia Khiang and Png Eng Huat. All four Sengkang GRC MPs as well as Nicole Seah and Kenneth Foo were included in the list, replacing outgoing CEC members Firuz Khan, Dylan Foo, Terrence Tan and John Yam, as well as former MPs Chen Show Mao, Daniel Goh and Lee Li Lian.

Singh mentioned it was important for the party to retain some of its most experienced members like Low, who has been with the party since the early 1980s, especially the need of a younger cohort. Lim told on the media on her re-election that the party would continue to be mentored by the older cohort while entering a phase of renewal and growth for the next generation of leaders.

On 22 December, Jose Raymond stepped down as the chairman for the Singapore People's Party and retires from politics, so was the Assistant Secretary-General, Ariffin Sha, who also resigned from the party earlier in August. These resignations were accepted on 17 January 2021, and co-opted two new members, Osman Suliaman from the Reform Party, and Melvyn Chiu from the defunct Singaporeans First. The party's vice-chairman Williiamson Lee served as acting chairman, but no replacement was filled for the Assistant Secretary-General post and was left vacant.

On 28 March 2021, Progress Singapore Party held its CEC election with 11 members stepping down and 6 new members elected. On 1 April, Francis Yuen took over as Secretary-General of the Party with Tan Cheng Bock being chairperson.

=== Reform Party's CEC internal conflicts ===
On 5 August, Reform Party (RP) was the first to held a CEC renewal after the elections ended. RP's secretary-general Kenneth Jeyaretnam appointed Charles Yeo and Mahaboob Batcha (a businessman) as the new party's Chairman and Treasurer respectively, as part of the party's leadership renewal.

Former chairman Andy Zhu shortly posted on Facebook that he was unfairly dismissed by the party before allegations made against him by Jeyaretnam have been resolved and told that it was an "undemocratic stance". Jeyaretnam earlier had made changes to the party's payment methods without official approval, requiring all cheques for payments to be signed by the treasurer and one member from the CEC; Zhu said he had applied for Paynow and reactivated the party's online banking account, because of the need to quickly make full payment to contractors for services such as printing posters and distributing fliers, but Jeyretnam was accused on making payments to contractors using the wrong channels; he also mentioned the move was unfair and disputed Jeyaretnam's claim about the CEC's unanimous decision to suspend the duties for him and former Treasurer Noraini Yunus. However, Jeyaretnam added that the duo still have the opportunity to appeal the decision at a later time, and the post was taken down as the CEC has yet to deliberate the issues and makes a decision to appoint members of the CEC.

The seven members, including Zhu and Yunus, subsequently resigned from RP and formed a splinter party named Singapore United Party, with Zhu being the party's secretary-general. The party was registered to the gazette on 24 December. Osman Suliaman was among the members who resigned, but joined the Singapore People's Party instead.

=== Poster vandalism ===
The police arrested Lim Song Huat, a 48-year-old part-time security officer, for destroying election posters along with his accomplice Constantine Paul, 51, on 3 July, after police reports were first lodged on 1 July by both PAP and PSP. Lim faced three charges for vandalism, all for vandalizing three posters at Woodlands Street 13 reported at about 9:30 am on 3 July, while Paul was charged twice, each for vandalizing a poster at Bukit Batok East Avenue 5 and one of the PAP's team posters for Aljunied GRC. Lim was arrested by the Woodlands Police Division the following day after a closed-circuit television (CCTV) managed to record a footage of Lim vandalizing the post.

On 4 February 2021, the court fined Lim S$1,000 for a charge of vandalism, making it the first case of such kind a person was charged. Two other similar charges were taken into consideration. Paul, who also faces charges under the Act, is expected to plead guilty on 5 April.

Under Act 78A of the Parliamentary Elections Act, it is illegal for people attempting to vandalize and destroy election posters or banners, with each charge carrying a S$1,000 fine or a year imprisonment, or both. According to Deputy Public Prosecutor Selene Yap who foresees the case, she asked for the maximum fine of S$1,000, citing difficulties on detection as the posters were placed in public areas across Singapore.

=== Enmity remarks ===
The police arrested Sirajudeen Abdul Majeed, 52, for his racist remarks received on a WhatsApp message group, PSP MM Ground Group. Few weeks leading to the election on 12 June, the group was used to share information pertaining the election, but Sirajudeen purportedly received an image that have information of voters of racial groups living in Marymount SMC, which he studied without verifying the data with any official sources. Elections Department revealed that the distribution was not published publicly and its polling district boundaries depict in the image were not accurate. The following day at 1:50 pm, Sirajudeen shared the image to three men and encouraging to share it, commenting "the PAP wants to make the Malay community a sub-minority. But the Malays were the original residents of Singapore." and another comment that also included foreign immigrants. One of the people receiving the message, Mohammad Azri, immediately lodged a police report, which he explained that it "create awareness of what he perceived to be a strategy". Sirajudeen was again called by the police on August for another racial indecency, this time involving a dispute against his neighbors, in return he lodged two police reports citing "criminal harassment" and calling Malay "unprofessional" in terms on entering elite forces such as the Singapore Air Force.

Deputy Public Prosecutors Ng Yiwen and Tessa Tan, throughout the investigation, mentioned that Sirajuddeen's move was "to stoke fears that the PAP Government was seeking to marginalise the Malays in the country by allowing more immigrants into the country", adding that it was posted on a critical timing and the fear-mongering could have affected the foundation of multi-racism. Sirajudeen pleaded for mercy and leniency, adding that he was his family's sole breadwinner and has a child with special needs; in return, the judges ruled that these remarks could create friction and conflict between different races in Singapore, which cannot be taken lightly in the current security climate. Court documents also ruled that it did not mention whether PSP referred to the Progress Singapore Party, which the party also contested Marymount SMC.

On 8 February 2021, the court ruled Sirajudeen guilty of a charge of ill-will and slandering racial groups that intend to harm racial feelings and was jailed for two weeks and fined S$7,000; Sirajudeen took a $5,000 bail and is expected to begin his imprisonment by before 22 February. Two charges promoting enmity were currently taken in consideration. Penalties under Section 298A of the Penal Code under racial enmity carries a maximum three years imprisonment or a fine, or both.

== Analysis ==
=== Media and commentator analysis ===
Veteran journalist PN Balji suggested that voters sent a message to the PAP that a new style of politics and governance was needed. He added that newly elected Sengkang GRC MP Jamus Lim's warning during the televised election debate not to give the PAP a "blank cheque" had resonated with many voters. A desire for alternative voices in parliament drove the swing to the opposition and the tactics against Raeesah Khan has backfired on PAP especially for younger voters in Sengkang, where more than 65% of residents are aged below 45 and less than 10% are aged above 65. He added that the PAP had no central figure in charge of its campaign and PAP's plea for a "strong mandate" to lead Singapore out of the COVID-19 crisis had failed to resonate with voters. Historically, PAP tended to do well when there was a crisis such as in the 2001 election, held following the September 11 attacks in the United States which led to a recession where PAP secured 75.29% of the vote. Pritam Singh's handling of WP's election campaign and his response to the police report into Raeesah Khan was praised, by moving quickly to stand by the candidate.

The election was also seen as a rebuke to the PAP's "fourth generation" (4G) leaders which saw their vote majorities slashed, such as the "prime minister in waiting" Heng Swee Keat narrowly retaining East Coast GRC with a marginal 53.41% and the defeat of Ng Chee Meng and his team in Sengkang GRC. In contrast, senior PAP leaders' constituencies fared better such as Jurong GRC (74.62%), Pasir Ris-Punggol GRC (64.15%) and Bishan-Toa Payoh GRC (67.26%) despite seeing an anti-PAP vote swing. Speculation rose that PAP will be forced to rethink the issue of leadership transition given the lacklustre results for the 4G leaders.

Former PAP MP Inderjit Singh criticised the PAP for running personal attacks instead of focusing on the issues.

Finally, Inderjit Singh suggested the results for Aljunied GRC was a sign that Singaporeans have matured on the question of race where three elected WP candidates were minorities. Under the tenure of former leader Low Thia Khiang, WP established a Chinese-speaking support base. There were concerns citing that the fielding of more minority candidates and the failure to send a representative to the Chinese language televised election debate which may hamper WP's chances from holding Aljunied for a third term, but WP held on with a 9%-swing and expanded its support under Pritam Singh; Inderjit went on to praise WP on the quality of its selection of candidates and voters "are therefore willing to vote on the brand name" of the party instead of looking at the candidates' merits.

Other analysts said that the election showed that Singaporeans are beginning to move away from "bread and butter" issues which have been typically discussed in past election campaigns, towards topics like social inequality and government accountability. The swing against the government during a crisis was seen as "unprecedented", as Singaporeans were usually seen as "traditionally risk-averse".

Citi economist Kit Wei Zheng argued that as a result of the election among other things, due to discontent related to foreign workers (especially those white collar workers who compete with locals, such as the author, in industries such as financial services), the government could shrink this portion of the workforce which would affect both long term growth as well as property prices. He also believed it would shift the country towards more left-leaning policies. Others such as Chua Hak Bin and Associate Professor Lawrence Loh took a more nuanced view, suggesting that voters were swayed more by the quality of the opposition candidates and a shift from basic needs to social responsibilities.

Group Representation Constituencies were traditionally regarded as a PAP "fortress" in the past, but The Straits Times political analyst Linette Lai mentioned that GRCs now no longer became a "haven" but cited that the scheme is still a dilemma to win, regardless if the GRC is helmed by an anchor minister or not. In another analysis through an interview, NUS economics professor Ivan Png mentioned that PAP outperformed more in single-member constituencies than in GRCs, while another NUS political professor Bilveer Singh cited the opposition success like how WP managed to retain Aljunied GRC for two terms (nine years) up until the election. Observers noted a pattern that overstates the degree to which GRCs are now vulnerable, even to opposition parties that fielded credible teams, such as in the case for PSP's Tan and WP's Pritam contesting in West Coast GRC and Aljunied GRC respectively. Law professor Eugene Tan explained the GRCs are "not invincible" and "The PAP may well win big in GRCs, but it must not be forgotten that it has lost, and can lose big, in GRCs." Risk analyst Harrison Cheng mentioned the GRC system is meant to be difficult to lose to the oppositions though not impossible.

In a survey conducted by the Institute of Policy Studies on 1 October, the PAP's opinion rating has dropped by 93% from the last election down to 86%, while WP came second with ratings rising from 71% to 79%, and the new PSP have ratings of 60%.

In another observation according to Analytix Labs chief data analyst Chua Chin Hon, Facebook has become a widely used social media platform that tackles serious questions, and increasing its trend starting in April and overtaking the COVID-19 pandemic topics, based on a 8 October's analysis report.

=== PAP's analysis of result ===
In a press conference on 18 July, Lawrence Wong stated while 61.2% was a "clear mandate", it was below what PAP expected at 65% of the popular vote. He acknowledged that the Workers' Party ran a good campaign with a message of more checks and balances in Parliament resonating with many voters and the PSP had strong appeal in some parts of Singapore such as their western strongholds. He attributed a fall in support amongst voters aged in the 40s and 50s, and perhaps those in their early 60s driving the swing against the government. He added that the swing against PAP was not concentrated solely amongst younger voters while acknowledging unhappiness about the PAP style of campaigning, or how race issues were discussed and also the use of POFMA against opposition candidates. Middle-aged voters, he specified, voted against PAP due to economic hardship from business disruptions, job and income losses and also professionals who were displaced and forced into jobs with lower pay. Wong concluded that it was unlikely that PAP would win more than 65% in future due to increased desire for diversity in Parliament and for checks and balances, calling it a "new reality". He added that PAP had to better understand and connect with younger voters by being "a party that is able to represent their aspirations and bond with them" and address the "real economic pain" that a substantial segment of people in their 40s and 50s are feeling, also known as the "sandwiched generation" who are looking after elderly parents and also caring for young children.

=== Use of social media and technology ===
As the first election where physical rallies are not allowed due to the COVID-19 pandemic, social media, internet and memes, and for the first time in the history of elections, Constituency Political Broadcasts have been heavily used in terms on campaigning, and thus the increase of the election expenses, where it was capped at S$4 per voter per the number of electoral division by average. An analyst company, Circus Social suggested that candidates with a higher credibility or mention during the election generally performed better, such as in the case of WP's Aljunied GRC and Sengkang GRC teams and PSP's West Coast GRC team.

In another data analysis website Meltwater, the volume for social media conversations has increased by at least fourfold compared to the previous election in 2015, with the volume peaked on polling day where it had 128,311 conversations as compared to 8,071. PAP took up nearly half of the entire conversations during the entire election period, followed by WP which garnered more than a quarter of conversations and the most Facebook interactions, then PSP and SDP at about 8% each. Analysis however reported that it was currently 'unclear' whether social media interactions do necessarily translate into votes, but heavily praised on the efficiency of resources and campaigning and would continue to do so in future elections. Institute of Policy Studies researcher and vice-chairman of Media Literacy Council Carol Soon mentioned the evolving use of technology but most features were lesser used when writing posts, and noted that the smaller parties, such as RDU and RP, were putting at a disadvantage due to a smaller supporter's base. Associate Professor Eugene Tan emphasises that receiving viral headlines or highlights during election, such as Jamus Lim and Raeesah Khan, and the blooper made by Heng Swee Keat during his acceptance speech about the "East Coast plan" contributed a crucial factor on canvassing votes.

=== Expenditure by candidates ===
Under the rules by the Election Department, each candidate's spending limit is S$4 per voter multiplied by the total electorate in an electoral division (with no maximum spending cap), and participating candidates were required to declare their election expenses within 31 days after the election (all 192 candidates managed to declare it on 15 August), after which inspection are allowed from that date onwards until six months later on 20 February 2021. A report published on 21 August that S$9,164,967 were spent from all 192 candidates in total, more than the figure of S$7,136,943 compared from the 2015 election; among the expenditure, PAP spent the largest at S$6,972,369, followed by PSP at S$781,275, then WP with S$705,647, and SDP S$323,292. The figure also amounted to a combined S$7.82 million for election advertising (mostly through the internet), and about S$5.6 million for printed material, but other details such as the purchase of services and items were not mentioned. Analyst Eugene Tan highlighted PSP's expenditure in a statement for a new party: "the need to get the message out there in what is a very crowded opposition space in a very short time probably necessitated that sort of higher spending".

== Reactions ==
=== Asia-Pacific ===
- Australia: Prime Minister Scott Morrison called Prime Minister Lee to congratulate him on the results of the Singapore General Election and reaffirmed the "excellent relations between Singapore and Australia and looked forward to working together to advance bilateral cooperation".
- China: General Secretary and President of China Xi Jinping called Prime Minister Lee to congratulate him on the results of the Singapore General Election and reaffirmed the strong ties between Singapore and China as both countries mark the 30th anniversary of diplomatic relations this year.
- India: Indian Prime Minister Narendra Modi congratulated Prime Minister Lee Hsien Loong for his success in the election and sent his best wishes to the Singaporean people.
- Malaysia: Malaysian Prime Minister Muhyiddin Yassin called Prime Minister Lee Hsien Loong to convey his congratulations on the results of the Singapore General Election and agreed that the two governments should continue to work together to overcome the common challenges posed by the COVID-19 pandemic.
- Maldives: Maldives President Ibrahim Mohamed Solih congratulated Prime Minister Lee Hsien Loong for the victory in the election.
- North Korea: North Korean Premier Kim Jae-ryong congratulated Prime Minister Lee Hsien Loong for his reappointment in the aftermath of the election.
- South Korea: South Korean President Moon Jae-in congratulated Prime Minister Lee Hsien Loong for his victory in the election.
- Vietnam: Vietnamese Prime Minister Nguyen Xuan Phuc cabled a message of congratulations to his Singaporean counterpart Lee Hsien Loong on the country's successful organisation of the 2020 General Election.

=== Americas ===
- United States: In a statement, United States Secretary of State Mike Pompeo congratulated Prime Minister Lee Hsien Loong on the PAP's victory and reaffirmed the "valuable partnership" between the two countries.

== See also ==
- Elections in Singapore
- Impact of the COVID-19 pandemic on politics
