= NWR =

NWR may refer to:

== Organizations ==
- National Women's Register, a network of women's discussion groups
- New World Resources, a European coal mining company
- Newman Wachs Racing, an American auto racing team
- NOAA Weather Radio, a network of radio stations broadcasting weather information in the US
- North West Radio, former radio station that broadcast 1989–2004 in parts of Ireland

== Other uses ==
- National Wildlife Refuge, a protected area of the US managed by the US Fish and Wildlife Service
- Nawaru language (ISO 639:nwr), spoken in Papua New Guinea
- Newport World Resorts, a resort in Metro Manila, Philippines
- North Western Railway (disambiguation)
- Nicolas Winding Refn, a Danish movie maker.

== See also ==
- L&NWR (London and North Western Railway)
