= Hokusei =

Hokusei may refer to:

- Hokusei, Mie, a former town in Inabe District, Mie Prefecture, Japan, now part of the city of Inabe
- Hokusei Station
- Northwest (disambiguation)
