= Nord-Ouest =

Nord-Ouest (French for northwest) may refer to:

- Nord-Ouest (department), Haiti
- Territoires du Nord-Ouest, Canada
- North-West France (European Parliament constituency)
- Northwest Region (Cameroon) (Région du Nord-Ouest)

== See also ==
- Northwest (disambiguation)
- Northwestern Province (disambiguation)
- Nord-Est (disambiguation) (northeast)
- Sud-Ouest (disambiguation) (southwest)
- Sud-Est (disambiguation) (southeast)
