= North West Community Development Council =

Local council in North West District, Singapore

Coordinates: 1.4351°N 103.7784°E

Type
- Type: Local authority of the North West District

Leadership
- Mayor: Alex Yam
- General Manager: Steve Luo Wee Phing
- Seats: 20

Website
- northwest.cdc.gov.sg

North West District of Singapore

The North West Community Development Council is one of five Community Development Councils (CDCs) set up across the Republic of Singapore to aid in local administration of governmental policies and schemes. They are funded in part by the government although they are free to engage in fund-raising activities.

== Constituencies ==
As of May 2025, the North West district covers:

=== Single Member Constituency (SMC) ===
- Bukit Panjang SMC
- Sembawang West SMC

=== Group Representation Constituency (GRC) ===
- Holland-Bukit Timah GRC
  - Bukit Timah
  - Cashew
  - Ulu Pandan
  - Zhenghua
- Marsiling-Yew Tee GRC
  - Limbang
  - Marsiling
  - Woodgrove
  - Yew Tee
- Nee Soon GRC
  - Chong Pang
  - Nee Soon Central
  - Nee Soon East
  - Nee Soon South
  - Nee Soon Link
- Sembawang GRC
  - Admiralty
  - Canberra
  - Naval Base
  - Sembawang Central
  - Woodlands

== Results of CDC by election ==
The North West CDC is one of a few CDCs with the fewest seats in proportion for GRC per each Parliament and initially started with a few number of seats being contested, but was gradually increased in each election over time. Despite anticipation of difficult contests including those of Singapore Democratic Party, the PAP vote share in this CDC still polled above national average in all but one election, with 2015 being an exception.

Year	Constituencies (GRC seats in parenthesis)	Seat composition		Electorate		PAP vote share	
Year	Constituencies (GRC seats in parenthesis)	Total	Contested	Total	Contested	Total votes	Vote share
2001	Holland-Bukit Panjang (5), Nee Soon Central, Nee Soon East, Sembawang (6)	14 / 84	2 / 14	336,411	51,440	36,321	75.84%
2006	Bukit Panjang, Holland-Bukit Timah (5), Nee Soon Central, Nee Soon East, Sembawang (6)	15 / 84	9 / 15	389,149	270,994	186,982	74.80%
2011	Bukit Panjang, Holland-Bukit Timah (4), Nee Soon (5), Sembawang (5)	15 / 87	15 / 15	415,409	415,409	234,140	61.29%
2015	Bukit Panjang, Holland-Bukit Timah (4), Marsiling-Yew Tee (4), Nee Soon (5), Sembawang (5)	19 / 89	19 / 19	523,368	523,368	332,291	68.79%
2020	Bukit Panjang, Holland-Bukit Timah (4), Marsiling-Yew Tee (4), Nee Soon (5), Sembawang (5)	19 / 93	19 / 19	540,130	540,130	339,600	63.97%
2025	Bukit Panjang, Holland-Bukit Timah (4), Marsiling-Yew Tee (4), Nee Soon (5), Sembawang (5), Sembawang West	20 / 97	20 / 20	586,424	586,424	386,363	71.87%

== Mayors ==
The incumbent Mayor of North West District is MP of Marsiling–Yew Tee GRC Alex Yam from the People's Action Party since 2020.

#	Name	Start of term	End of term	Political Party
1	Teo Ho Pin	24 November 2001	26 July 2020	People's Action Party
2	Alex Yam	27 July 2020	Incumbent	People's Action Party
