= Northwestern College =

Northwestern College can refer to:

- Northwestern College (Illinois) in Bridgeview, Illinois
- Northwestern College (Iowa) in Orange City, Iowa
- The former Northwestern College (Minnesota) in Roseville, Minnesota, now known as University of Northwestern – St. Paul
- The former Northwestern College (Wisconsin) in Watertown, Wisconsin, which was incorporated into Martin Luther College in New Ulm, Minnesota, in 1995
- The former Northwestern College (Fergus Falls, Minnesota), which closed in 1932.
- Northwest Louisiana Technical College, Minden, Louisiana
- Northwestern Michigan College, Traverse City, Michigan

== See also ==
- Northwest College, Powell, Wyoming, USA
- Northwestern University (disambiguation)
- Northwest University (disambiguation)
