= Northwestern University (disambiguation) =

Northwestern University is an educational institution based in Evanston, Illinois, United States.

Other higher education institutions with almost the same names include:

- Northwest University (China), in Xi'an
- Northwestern University (Philippines), in Laoag
- Northwestern University in Qatar, in Al-Rayyan
- North Western University, Bangladesh, Khulna

Other higher education institutions with Northwestern in their names:

- Northwestern California University School of Law, Sacramento, California
- Northwestern Health Sciences University, Bloomington, Minnesota
- Northwestern Oklahoma State University, Alva, Oklahoma
- Northwestern Polytechnic University, Fremont, California
- Northwestern State University, Natchitoches, Louisiana
- University of Northwestern Ohio, Lima, Ohio
- University of Northwestern – St. Paul, Saint Paul, Minnesota
- Northwestern Christian University, former name of Butler University, Indianapolis, Indiana
- Northwestern Polytechnical University, Xi'an, Shaanxi, China
- Lyceum-Northwestern University, Dagupan, Pangasinan, Philippines

== See also ==
- Northwest University (disambiguation)
- Northwestern College (disambiguation)
