= Teo Ho Pin =

Singaporean politician

- 张俰宾
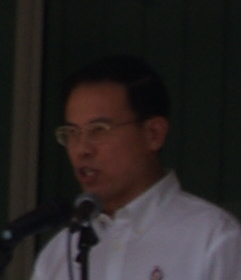
- Teo in 2011

Mayor of North West District
- In office 24 November 2001 – 26 July 2020
- Prime Minister: Goh Chok Tong; Lee Hsien Loong
- Succeeded by: Alex Yam

Member of Parliament for Bukit Panjang SMC
- In office 6 May 2006 – 23 June 2020
- Preceded by: Constituency established
- Succeeded by: Liang Eng Hwa (PAP)

Member of Parliament for Holland–Bukit Panjang GRC
- In office 25 October 2001 – 19 April 2006
- Preceded by: Constituency established
- Succeeded by: Constituency abolished

Member of Parliament for Sembawang GRC
- In office 23 December 1996 – 17 October 2001
- Preceded by: PAP held
- Succeeded by: PAP held

Personal details
- Born: Teo Ho Pin; 19 January 1960 (age 66) State of Singapore
- Party: People's Action Party
- Education: National University of Singapore (BS); Heriot-Watt University (MS, PhD)

Teo Ho Pin (Note: Chinese: 张俰宾; Pe̍h-ōe-jī: Tioⁿ Hô-pin; pinyin: Zhāng Huòbīn) (born 19 January 1960) is a Singaporean former politician who served as Mayor of North West District in Singapore between 2001 and 2020, making him the country's longest-serving mayor.

A member of the governing People's Action Party (PAP), Teo was the Member of Parliament (MP) for Bukit Panjang Single Member Constituency between 2006 and 2020, and a MP of the Holland–Bukit Panjang Group Representation Constituency (GRC) between 2001 and 2006 and the Sembawang GRC between 1996 and 2001. He also served as Mayor of North West District between 2001 and 2020.

== Education ==
Teo attended New Town Secondary School and National Junior College before graduating from the National University of Singapore in 1985 with a Bachelor of Science with honours degree in building.

He subsequently went on to complete a Master of Science degree in project management and a PhD in building at Heriot-Watt University in 1987 and 1990 respectively.

== Career ==
Teo was a senior lecturer at the National University of Singapore between 1985 and 1999. He also served as President of the Singapore Institute of Building between 1996 and 2002 and Consumers' Association of Singapore between 1999 and 2001.

In 2020, Teo was appointed as independent director of construction and civil engineering company Tiong Seng Holdings after stepping down from politics.

=== Political career ===
Teo's political career began in 1996 when he was elected a member of parliament for the Sembawang Group Representation Constituency (Sembawang GRC). He subsequently served as an MP for Holland–Bukit Panjang GRC from 2001 to 2006, and for Bukit Panjang Single Member Constituency (Bukit Panjang SMC) from 2006 to 2011. In the 2011 general elections, Teo was voted into office again as an MP for Bukit Panjang SMC.

Teo was also Mayor of the North-West CDC from 2001 till his retirement in 2020 and also the Deputy Government Whip.

Teo retired from politics in 2020 and did not contest in the 2020 Singaporean general election.

== Notes ==
Government offices
| New office | Mayor of the North West district 2001 – 2020 | Succeeded by Alex Yam |
Parliament of Singapore
| Preceded by Lee Yiok Seng | Member of Parliament for Sembawang GRC (Bukit Panjang); 1997 – 2001 | Constituency redrawn |
| New constituency | Member of Parliament for Holland–Bukit Panjang GRC (Bukit Panjang); 2001 – 2006 | Constituency redrawn |
| New constituency | Member of Parliament for Bukit Panjang SMC; 2006 – 2020 | Succeeded by Liang Eng Hwa |
