= North Western Oklahoma City =

Coordinates: 35°31′21″N 97°31′47″W

The Western Avenue District of Oklahoma City is a district along Western Avenue stretching roughly from NW 30th to Wilshire Blvd, near the suburb of Nichols Hills. The area is home to several restaurants, shops, and businesses that are unique to Oklahoma City.

Besides the restaurants, Western Avenue is also home to the Bishop McGuinness High School and the corporate headquarters of Chesapeake Energy.
