= Bukit Panjang Single Member Constituency =

Electoral division in Singapore

Coordinates: 1.377°N 103.773°E

Bukit Panjang
- Single-member constituency for the Parliament of Singapore
- Region: West Region, Singapore
- Electorate: 33,596

Current constituency
- Created: 2006; 20 years ago
- Seats: 1
- Party: People's Action Party
- Member: Liang Eng Hwa
- Town Council: Holland–Bukit Panjang
- Reformed: 2006
- Reformed from: Holland–Bukit Panjang GRC

The Bukit Panjang Single Member Constituency (Note: Malay: Kawasan Undi Perseorangan Bukit Panjang; Chinese: 武吉班让单选区; Tamil: புக்கிட் பாஞ்சாங் தனித்தொகுதி) is a single-member constituency (SMC) situated in north-western Singapore. Recreated in 2006 after having been merged in 1991, it is managed by Holland–Bukit Panjang Town Council (HBPTC). The current Member of Parliament (MP) for the constituency is Liang Eng Hwa from the People's Action Party (PAP).

The constituency had previously existed as Bukit Panjang Constituency from 1955 to 1988, before being renamed Bukit Panjang Single Member Constituency from 1988 to 1991. In 1991, it was merged into Sembawang Group Representation Constituency (GRC) prior to the 1991 general election. Bukit Panjang was tied with Potong Pasir SMC for the most number of appearances as SMC with 14 elections, though the latter Potong Pasir SMC had the most number of consecutive appearances since its formation.

== Electoral history ==
Bukit Panjang Constituency was established for the 1955 general election and was renamed Bukit Panjang SMC in 1988. It was then abolished in 1991. From 1991 to 2006, Bukit Panjang SMC did not exist.

The SMC was reinstated during the electoral boundary review ahead of the 2006 general election. The reconstituted seat was formed from parts of the former Holland–Bukit Panjang Group Representation Constituency (GRC), which had absorbed the area in the 2001 general election. At the same time, Holland–Bukit Panjang GRC was dissolved in favour of Holland–Bukit Timah GRC.

Ahead of the 2020 general election, incumbent PAP MP Teo Ho Pin announced his retirement from politics. The PAP nominated Liang Eng Hwa, then-MP for the Zhenghua division of Holland–Bukit Timah GRC. The Singapore Democratic Party (SDP) contested the seat with infectious diseases expert Paul Tambyah as its candidate. Liang won with 53.74% of the vote, defeating Tambyah by 2,509 votes.

In March 2025, it was confirmed that both candidates would stand again in the 2025 general election. Liang was re-elected with an increased vote share of 61.41%, in line with a broader national swing towards the PAP.

== Constituency profile ==
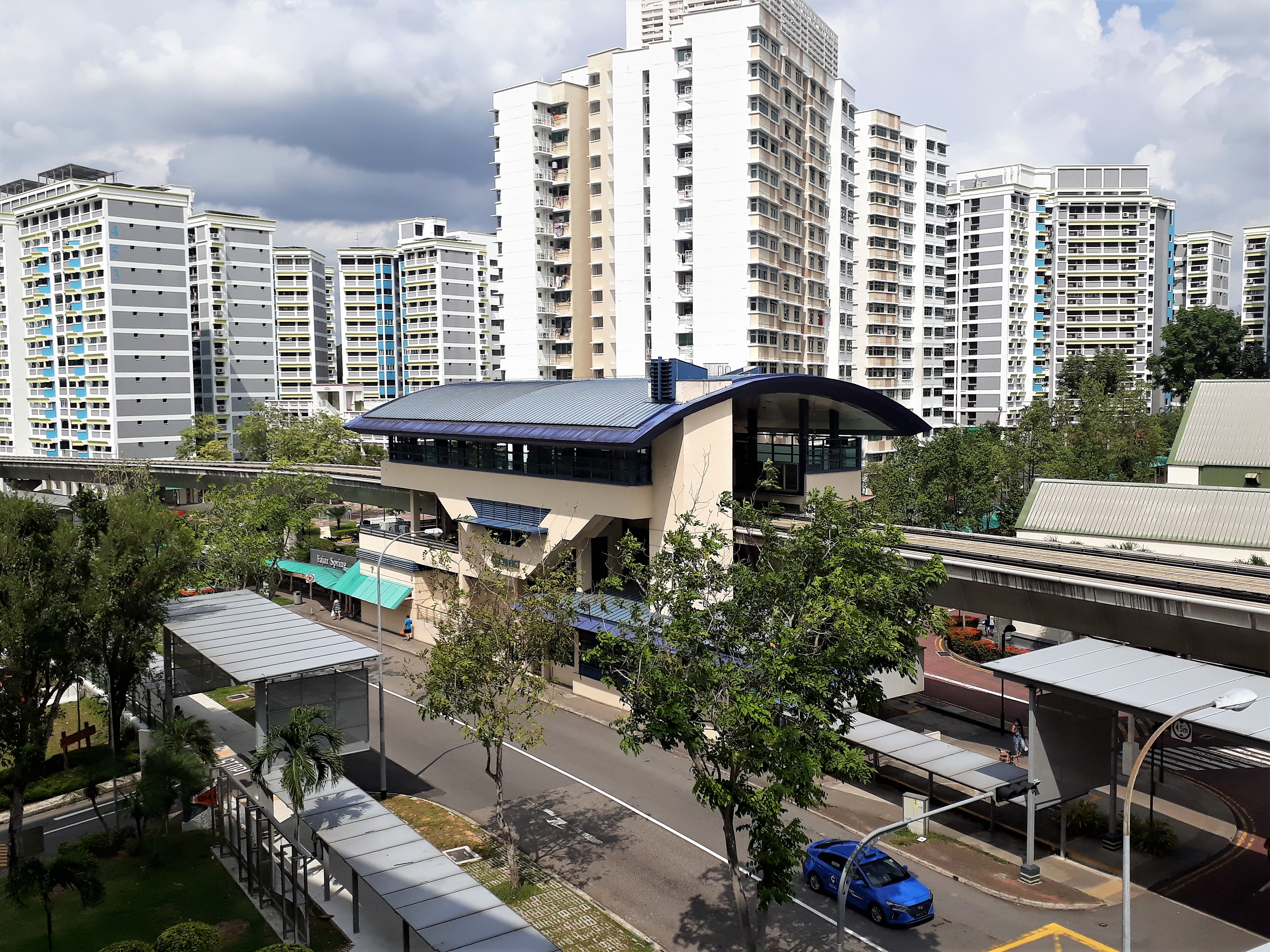
Fajar LRT station and its surrounding areas, which are under Bukit Panjang SMC

Interactive map of Bukit Panjang SMC as of the 2025 general election

Bukit Panjang SMC is located in the north western part of Singapore and covers much of the Bukit Panjang planning area. It includes the subzones of Fajar and Bangkit with the Bukit Panjang LRT line running through the constituency. LRT stations such as Fajar, Bangkit and Pending serve the area. The constituency is mainly residential with local amenities like Bukit Panjang Hawker Centre and Market, Bangkit Market and Fajar Shopping Centre. The constituency also features community and recreational facilities such as Bukit Panjang Community Club and Al Iman Mosque. Parts of the Rail Corridor near Zhenghua Park lie within its boundaries.

== Member of Parliament ==
Year	Member	Party
Formation
2006	Teo Ho Pin	PAP
2011	Teo Ho Pin	PAP
2015	Teo Ho Pin	PAP
2020	Liang Eng Hwa	PAP
2025	Liang Eng Hwa	PAP

== Electoral results ==
Note: The Elections Department does not include rejected votes when calculating the vote shares of candidates. Hence, all candidates' vote shares will total to 100% at any given election (may not appear so in multi-way contests due to rounding).

=== Elections in 2000s ===
General Election 2006
Party	Candidate	Votes	%
PAP	Teo Ho Pin	21,652	77.19
SDP	Ling How Doong	6,400	22.81
Majority		15,252	54.38
Total valid votes		28,052	96.91
Rejected ballots		893	3.09
Turnout		28,945	95.05
Registered electors		30,452	
PAP win (new seat)			

=== Elections in 2010s ===
General Election 2011
Party	Candidate	Votes	%	±%
PAP	Teo Ho Pin	20,375	66.27	▼10.92
SDP	Alec Tok	10,372	33.73	▲10.92
Majority		10,003	32.54	▼21.82
Total valid votes		30,747	96.59	▼0.98
Rejected ballots		745	3.41	▲0.98
Registered electors		33,053		▲8.54
Turnout		31,492	95.28	▲0.23
PAP hold		Swing	▼10.92	

General Election 2015
Party	Candidate	Votes	%	±%
PAP	Teo Ho Pin	21,954	68.38	▲2.11
SDP	Khung Wai Yeen	10,152	31.62	▼2.11
Majority		11,792	36.76	▲4.22
Total valid votes		32,106	98.17	▲1.50
Rejected ballots		626	1.91	▼1.50
Turnout		32,704	95.30	▲0.02
Registered electors		34,317		▲3.82
PAP hold		Swing	▲2.11	

=== Elections in 2020s ===
General Election 2020
Party	Candidate	Votes	%	±%
PAP	Liang Eng Hwa	18,085	53.73	▼14.65
SDP	Paul Tambyah	15,576	46.27	▲14.65
Majority		2,509	7.46	▼29.30
Total valid votes		33,661	98.29	▲0.12
Rejected ballots		586	1.71	▼0.12
Turnout		34,247	96.64	▲1.34
Registered electors		35,437		▲3.26
PAP hold		Swing	▼14.65	

General Election 2025
Party	Candidate	Votes	%	±%
PAP	Liang Eng Hwa	19,152	61.38	▲7.65
SDP	Paul Tambyah	12,051	38.62	▼7.65
Majority		7,101	22.76	▲15.30
Total valid votes		31,203	98.89	▲0.60
Rejected ballots		350	1.11	▼0.60
Turnout		31,553	93.92	▼2.72
Registered electors		33,596		▼5.20
PAP hold		Swing	▲7.65	

== Historical maps ==
Bukit Panjang constituency for the 1955 general election to the Legislative Assembly
