= Northwest University =

Northwest University may refer to:

- Northwest University (China) in Xi'an, Shaanxi, China
- Northwest University (United States) in Kirkland, Washington, US
- North-West University in Potchefstroom and Mahikeng, North West Province, South Africa
- Northwest University, Kano, Nigeria

== See also ==
- Northwestern University (disambiguation)
- Northwestern College (disambiguation)
- Indiana University Northwest in Gary, Indiana, USA
- Northwest Christian University in Eugene, Oregon, USA
- Northwest Missouri State University in Maryville, Missouri, USA
- Northwest Nazarene University in Nampa, Idaho, USA
- Pacific Northwest University of Health Sciences in Yakima, Washington, USA
- Northwest Normal University in Lanzhou, Gansu, China
- Northwest Minzu University in Lanzhou, Gansu, China
- Northwest University of Politics and Law in Xi'an, Shaanxi, China
- North West Agriculture and Forestry University in Yangling, Shaanxi, China
