= Northwest Passage (disambiguation) =

The Northwest Passage is a historical sea route between the Pacific and Atlantic Oceans, through the Arctic waters of Canada, Alaska, and Greenland.

Northwest Passage may also refer to:

== Literature ==
- Northwest Passage (children's book), a 2013 illustrated children's book written by Stan Rogers and illustrated by Matt James
- Northwest Passage (novel), a 1937 historical novel by Kenneth Roberts

== Music ==
- Northwest Passage (album), a 1981 album by Stan Rogers
  - "Northwest Passage" (song), its title track
- Northwest Passage, a 1997 album by Oregon
- "Northwest Passage", a big band tune by Ralph Burns

== Television ==
- Northwest Passage (TV series), a 1958-1959 television series starring Keith Larsen and Buddy Ebsen
- "Northwest Passage" (Fringe), a 2010 episode of Fringe
- "Northwest Passage" (Twin Peaks) or "Pilot", a 1990 episode of Twin Peaks

== Other arts, entertainment, and media ==
- Northwest Passage (film), a 1940 film starring Spencer Tracy and Robert Young
- Northwest Passage (newspaper), an underground newspaper of the 1960s
- The North-West Passage, an 1874 painting by John Everett Millais

== See also ==
- Northeast Passage
