= Eugene Tan =

Singaporean politician

- 陈庆文
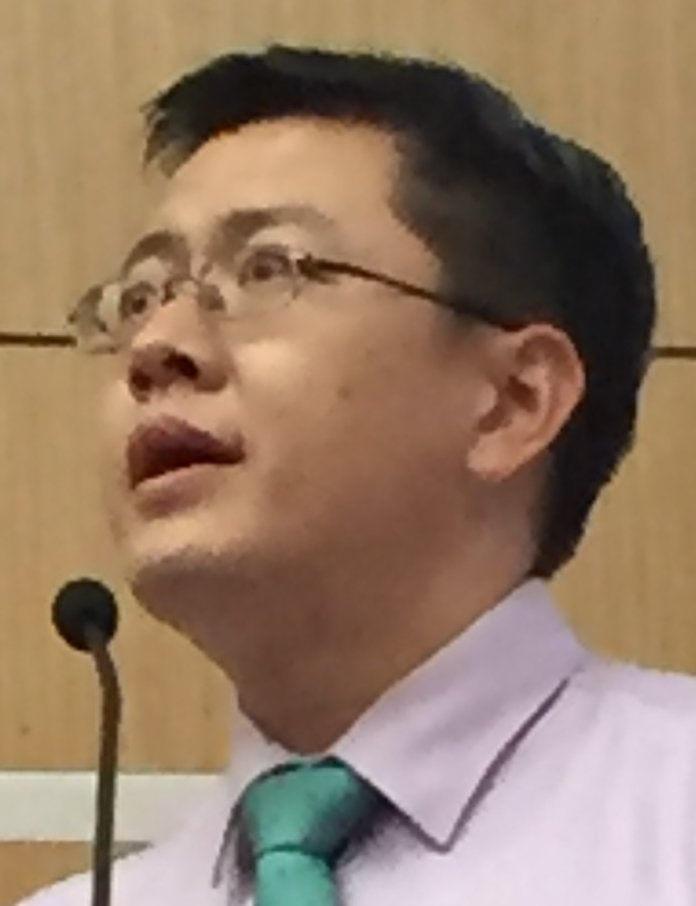
- Tan in 2015

Nominated Member of the 12th Parliament of Singapore
- In office 14 February 2012 – 13 August 2014
- Appointed by: Tony Tan

Personal details
- Born: 18 February 1970 (age 56) Singapore
- Education: National University of Singapore (LLB); London School of Economics (MS); Stanford University (JSM)
- Occupation: Academic
- Website: Official website

Eugene Tan
- Simplified Chinese: 陈庆文
Transcriptions
Standard Mandarin
- Hanyu Pinyin: Chén Qìngwén
Southern Min
- Hokkien POJ: Tân Khèng-bûn

Eugene Tan Kheng Boon (born 18 February 1970) is a Singaporean academic who is currently an associate professor of law at the Singapore Management University. Tan served as a Nominated Member of Parliament between 2012 and 2014.

Tan’s specialisation includes constitutional and administrative law, and policy of ethnic relations in Singapore.

Tan regularly writes for several media outlets in Singapore. He is also quoted regularly in all news sources within Singapore, and in major international press, particularly on matters related to domestic politics, constitutional law and elections.
