= Northwestern Province =

Northwestern Province or Northwest Province or North-Western Province may refer to:

- Northwest Region, Cameroon, Northwest Region since 2008
- North-West Frontier Province (1901–55), Pakistan, Khyber Pakhtunkhwa since 2010
- North West Province, Sierra Leone, created in 2017
- North West (South African province), established 1994
- North Western Province, Sri Lanka, also known as Wayamba
- North-Western Province, Zambia
- North Western Province (Victoria), an electorate of the Victorian Legislative Council (Australia) from 1856 to 2006
- Northwest Province (IMCRA region), an Australian marine biogeographic province
- North-Western Provinces, an administrative region in British India which existed in one form or another from 1836 until 1902
