= North Western Railway (disambiguation) =

The North Western Railway zone is one of 19 railway zones in India.

North Western Railway may also refer to:

- "Little" North Western Railway (NWR), a British railway company from 1848 to 1879
- North Western Railway (fictional), the railway company featured in The Railway Series and Thomas the Tank Engine & Friends
- North Western State Railway - upon division of British India in year 1947 the major portion of it became Pakistan Railways and remaining portion in India became Eastern Punjab Railway.

== See also ==
- Austrian Northwestern Railway, former railway company during the Austro-Hungarian monarchy
- Chicago & North Western Railway, a previous name of the Chicago & North Western Transportation Company, an American railway company from 1859 to 1995
- First North Western, former British passenger train company; originally known as North Western Trains
- London & North Western Railway, a British railway company from 1846 to 1922; ancestor of today's West Coast Main Line
  - London Northwestern Railway a modern train operating company partly using the above route
- North Western Railroad, a short-lived Pennsylvania short-line railroad in the 1850s
