= Holland–Bukit Panjang Group Representation Constituency =

Former electoral division in Singapore

The Holland–Bukit Panjang Group Representation Constituency was a defunct Group Representation Constituency (GRC) in Singapore which was founded during prior to the 2001 general elections. It lasted one electoral term before being mostly merged into Holland–Bukit Timah GRC prior to the 2006 general election.

== History ==
In 2001, the Holland–Bukit Panjang GRC was formed by merging the Buona Vista ward of the Tanjong Pagar GRC, Bukit Panjang ward of the Sembawang GRC and Ulu Pandan ward from the Bukit Timah GRC. The Bukit Panjang ward was split into Cashew and Zhenghua divisions.

In 2006, the GRC was absorbed into Holland–Bukit Timah GRC with the Bukit Panjang division carved to form the Bukit Panjang Single Member Constituency.

== Members of Parliament ==
Election	Division	Member	Party
Formation (2001)
2001	Buona Vista; Cashew; Ulu Pandan; Zhenghua; Bukit Panjang	Lim Swee Say; David Lim Tik En; Vivian Balakrishnan; Gan Kim Yong; Teo Ho Pin	PAP
Constituency abolished (2006)

== Electoral results ==
Note: The Elections Department does not include rejected votes when calculating the vote shares of candidates. Hence, all candidates' vote shares will total to 100% at any given election (may not appear so in multi-way contests due to rounding).

=== Elections in 2000s ===
General Election 2001
Party	Candidate	Votes	%
PAP	Lim Swee Say; Teo Ho Pin; Vivian Balakrishnan; Gan Kim Yong; David Lim Tik En	Unopposed	
Registered electors		118,834	
PAP win (new seat)			
