= 10th Parliament of Singapore =

Singaporean parliamentary meeting

←	9th	11th	→
Composition as of 2 July 2002
Government:
PAP (81)
Opposition:
SDA (2)
WP (1)
NMP (9)

Overview
- Legislative body: Parliament of Singapore
- Meeting place: Parliament House
- Term: 25 March 2002 – 20 April 2006 (4 years and 26 days)
- Election: 3 November 2001
- Government: People's Action Party
- Opposition: Singapore Democratic Alliance; Workers' Party

Parliament of Singapore
- Members: 83 + 1 NCMP + 9 NMPs
- Speaker: Abdullah Tarmugi
- Leader of the House: Wong Kan Seng
- Prime Minister: Goh Chok Tong (until 12 August 2004); Lee Hsien Loong (from 12 August 2004)
- Leader of the Opposition: Chiam See Tong
- Party control: PAP supermajority

Sessions
- 1st: 25 March 2002 – 1 December 2004 (2 years, 8 months and 6 days)
- 2nd: 12 January 2005 – 20 April 2006 (1 year, 3 months and 8 days)

The 10th Parliament of Singapore was a meeting of the Parliament of Singapore. The first session commenced on 25 March 2002 and was prorogued on the 1 December 2004. The second session begun from 12 January 2005 and was dissolved on 20 April 2006, with the final sitting held on 3 April.

The members of the Tenth Parliament were elected in the 2001 general election. Parliament was controlled by a People's Action Party majority, who were led by Prime Minister Goh Chok Tong and his Cabinet until 12 August 2004, when Lee Hsien Loong and his Cabinet assumed power. Abdullah Tarmugi was elected as the Speaker of the House on 25 March 2002. The de facto Leader of the Opposition was Chiam See Tong of the Singapore Democratic Alliance.

The Tenth Parliament was notable for the introduction of Penny Low and Chong Weng Chiew, who were both the first two MPs born after Singapore's post-independence. As of 2026, the Tenth Parliament was also the only Parliament that had no vacancies arising partway through the term.

== Results of the 2001 general election ==
Party	Votes	%	Seats	+/–
People's Action Party	470,765	75.29	82	▲1
Singapore Democratic Alliance	75,248	12.03	2	▲1
Singapore Democratic Party	50,607	8.09	0	Steady
Workers' Party	19,060	3.05	1	Steady
Democratic Progressive Party	5,334	0.85	0	Steady
Independents	4,253	0.68	0	Steady
Total	625,267	100.00	85	▲1
Valid votes	625,267	97.87		
Invalid/blank votes	13,636	2.13		
Total votes	638,903	100.00		
Registered voters/turnout	2,036,923	94.61		
Source: Singapore Elections

== Officeholders ==
=== Speakers ===
- Speaker: Abdullah Tarmugi (East Coast GRC, PAP)
- Deputy Speaker:
  - Chew Heng Ching (East Coast GRC, PAP), from 1 April 2002
  - Lim Hwee Hua (Marine Parade GRC, PAP), from 1 April 2002 until 11 August 2004
  - S. Iswaran (West Coast GRC, PAP), from 1 September 2004

=== Leaders ===
- Prime Minister:
  - Goh Chok Tong (Marine Parade GRC, PAP), until 12 August 2004
  - Lee Hsien Loong (Ang Mo Kio GRC, PAP), from 12 August 2004
- Leader of the Opposition: Chiam See Tong (Potong Pasir SMC, SDA)

=== House Leaders ===
- Leader of the House: Wong Kan Seng (Bishan–Toa Payoh GRC, PAP)
- Deputy Leader of the House: Mah Bow Tan (Tampines GRC, PAP), from 1 April 2002

=== Whips ===
- Government Party Whip: Lee Boon Yang (Jalan Besar GRC, PAP)
- Deputy Government Party Whip:
  - Lim Swee Say (Holland–Bukit Panjang GRC, PAP)
  - Inderjit Singh (Ang Mo Kio GRC, PAP)

== Composition ==
Political party	Members	
Political party	At election	At dissolution
PAP	81	81
Singapore Democratic Alliance	1 + 1 NCMP	1 + 1 NCMP
Workers' Party	1	1
Nominated Members of Parliament	0	9
Vacant seats	9	0
Total	93	93
Government majority	79	79

== Members ==
Constituency	Division	Member	Party
Aljunied GRC	Aljunied–Hougang	Yeo Guat Kwang 杨木光	PAP
Aljunied GRC	Aljunied–Kembangan	Ong Seh Hong 王世丰	PAP
Aljunied GRC	Eunos	Zainul Abidin زین العابدین	PAP
Aljunied GRC	Kembangan–Punggol	George Yeo 杨荣文	PAP
Aljunied GRC	Paya Lebar	Cynthia Phua 潘惜玉	PAP
Ang Mo Kio GRC	Cheng San–Seletar	Balaji Sadasivan பாலாஜி சதாசிவன்	PAP
Ang Mo Kio GRC	Jalan Kayu	Wee Siew Kim 黃守金	PAP
Ang Mo Kio GRC	Kebun Baru	Inderjit Singh ਇੰਦਰਜੀਤ ਸਿੰਘ	PAP
Ang Mo Kio GRC	Nee Soon South	Tan Boon Wan 陈文焕	PAP
Ang Mo Kio GRC	Teck Ghee	Lee Hsien Loong 李显龙	PAP
Ang Mo Kio GRC	Yio Chu Kang	Seng Han Thong 成汉通	PAP
Ayer Rajah SMC		Tan Cheng Bock 陈清木	PAP
Bishan–Toa Payoh GRC	Bishan East	Wong Kan Seng 黄根成	PAP
Bishan–Toa Payoh GRC	Bishan North	Zainudin Nordin زاينودين نوردين	PAP
Bishan–Toa Payoh GRC	Thomson	Leong Horn Kee 梁汉基	PAP
Bishan–Toa Payoh GRC	Toa Payoh Central	Ng Eng Hen 黄永宏	PAP
Bishan–Toa Payoh GRC	Toa Payoh East	Davinder Singh ਦਵਿੰਦਰ ਸਿੰਘ	PAP
Bukit Timah SMC		Wang Kai Yuen 王家园	PAP
Chua Chu Kang SMC		Low Seow Chay 刘绍济	PAP
East Coast GRC	Bedok	S. Jayakumar எஸ். செயக்குமார்	PAP
East Coast GRC	Changi–Simei	Lee Yock Suan 李玉全	PAP
East Coast GRC	Fengshan	Raymond Lim 林双吉	PAP
East Coast GRC	Kaki Bukit	Chew Heng Ching 周亨增	PAP
East Coast GRC	Kampong Chai Chee	Tan Soo Khoon 陈树群	PAP
East Coast GRC	Siglap	Abdullah Tarmugi عبد الله موعي	PAP
Holland–Bukit Panjang GRC	Bukit Panjang	Teo Ho Pin 张俰宾	PAP
Holland–Bukit Panjang GRC	Buona Vista	Lim Swee Say 林瑞生	PAP
Holland–Bukit Panjang GRC	Cashew	David Lim 林得恩	PAP
Holland–Bukit Panjang GRC	Ulu Pandan	Vivian Balakrishnan விவியன் பாலகிருஷ்ணன்	PAP
Holland–Bukit Panjang GRC	Zhenghua	Gan Kim Yong 颜金勇	PAP
Hong Kah GRC	Bukit Gombak	Ang Mong Seng 洪茂诚	PAP
Hong Kah GRC	Hong Kah North	Amy Khor 许连碹	PAP
Hong Kah GRC	Keat Hong	Ahmad Khalis أحمد خالِص	PAP
Hong Kah GRC	Nanyang	John Chen 陈晓朋	PAP
Hong Kah GRC	Yew Tee	Yeo Cheow Tong 姚照东	PAP
Hougang SMC		Low Thia Khiang 刘程强	WP
Jalan Besar GRC	Jalan Besar	Lee Boon Yang 李文献	PAP
Jalan Besar GRC	Kampong Glam	Loh Meng See 罗明士	PAP
Jalan Besar GRC	Kolam Ayer	Yaacob Ibrahim يعقوب إبراهيم	PAP
Jalan Besar GRC	Kreta Ayer–Kim Seng	Lily Neo 梁莉莉	PAP
Jalan Besar GRC	Whampoa	Heng Chee How 王志豪	PAP
Joo Chiat SMC		Chan Soo Sen 曾士生	PAP
Jurong GRC	Bukit Batok	Ong Chit Chung 翁执中	PAP
Jurong GRC	Bukit Batok East	Halimah Yacob حاليمه ياچوب	PAP
Jurong GRC	Jurong Central	Lim Boon Heng 林文兴	PAP
Jurong GRC	Taman Jurong	Tharman Shanmugaratnam தர்மன் சண்முகரத்னம்	PAP
Jurong GRC	Yuhua	Yu-Foo Yee Shoon 于符喜泉	PAP
MacPherson SMC		Matthias Yao 姚智	PAP
Marine Parade GRC	Braddell Heights	R. Ravindran ஆர். ரவீந்திரன்	PAP
Marine Parade GRC	Geylang Serai	Othman Haron Eusofe عثمان هارون يوسف	PAP
Marine Parade GRC	Kampong Ubi	Maidin Packer ميدين فقير	PAP
Marine Parade GRC	Marine Parade	Goh Chok Tong 吴作栋	PAP
Marine Parade GRC	Mountbatten	Andy Gan 颜来章	PAP
Marine Parade GRC	Serangoon	Lim Hwee Hua 林陈惠华	PAP
Nee Soon Central SMC		Ong Ah Heng 王雅兴	PAP
Nee Soon East SMC		Ho Peng Kee 何炳基	PAP
Pasir Ris–Punggol GRC	Pasir Ris East	Ahmad Magad أحمد ماعاد	PAP
Pasir Ris–Punggol GRC	Pasir Ris West	Teo Chee Hean 张志贤	PAP
Pasir Ris–Punggol GRC	Punggol Central	Michael Lim 林俊龙	PAP
Pasir Ris–Punggol GRC	Punggol North	Penny Low 刘𨮒琳	PAP
Pasir Ris–Punggol GRC	Punggol South	Charles Chong 张有福	PAP
Potong Pasir SMC		Chiam See Tong 詹时中	SDA
Sembawang GRC	Admiralty	Maliki Osman مالكي عثمان	PAP
Sembawang GRC	Canberra	Warren Lee 李伟仁	PAP
Sembawang GRC	Chong Pang	K. Shanmugam கா. சண்முகம்	PAP
Sembawang GRC	Marsiling	Hawazi Daipi هاوازي دايڤي	PAP
Sembawang GRC	Sembawang	Tony Tan 陈庆炎	PAP
Sembawang GRC	Woodlands	Chin Tet Yung 陈德镛	PAP
Tampines GRC	Tampines Central	Sin Boon Ann 陈文安	PAP
Tampines GRC	Tampines Changkat	Irene Ng 伍碧虹	PAP
Tampines GRC	Tampines East	Mah Bow Tan 马宝山	PAP
Tampines GRC	Tampines North	Ong Kian Min 王建明	PAP
Tampines GRC	Tampines West	Yatiman Yusof ياتيمان يوسف	PAP
Tanjong Pagar GRC	Moulmein	Khaw Boon Wan 许文远	PAP
Tanjong Pagar GRC	Queenstown	Chay Wai Chuen 谢惠泉	PAP
Tanjong Pagar GRC	Radin Mas	Chong Weng Chiew 庄永昭	PAP
Tanjong Pagar GRC	Tanglin–Cairnhill	Indranee Rajah இந்திராணி ராஜா	PAP
Tanjong Pagar GRC	Tanjong Pagar	Lee Kuan Yew 李光耀	PAP
Tanjong Pagar GRC	Tiong Bahru	Koo Tsai Kee 顾蔡矶	PAP
West Coast GRC	Boon Lay	Ho Geok Choo 何玉珠	PAP
West Coast GRC	Clementi	Arthur Fong 邝臻	PAP
West Coast GRC	Pioneer	Cedric Foo 符致镜	PAP
West Coast GRC	Telok Blangah	Lim Hng Kiang 林勋强	PAP
West Coast GRC	West Coast	S. Iswaran எஸ். ஈஸ்வரன்	PAP
Non-constituency Member of Parliament		Steve Chia 谢镜丰	SDA
Nominated Members of Parliament		Fang Ai Lian (2002–2005) 方爱莲	NMP
Nominated Members of Parliament		Gan See Khem (2002–2005) 颜诗琴	NMP
Nominated Members of Parliament		Jennifer Lee (2002–2005) 李玉珠	NMP
Nominated Members of Parliament		Olivia Lum (2002–2005) 林爱莲	NMP
Nominated Members of Parliament		Braema Mathi (2002–2005) பிரேமா மதி	NMP
Nominated Members of Parliament		Chandra Mohan Nair (2002–2005) ചന്ദ്ര മോഹൻ നായർ	NMP
Nominated Members of Parliament		Nithiah Nandan (2002–2005) நித்தியானந்தன்	NMP
Nominated Members of Parliament		Ng Ser Miang (2002–2005) 黄思绵	NMP
Nominated Members of Parliament		Ngiam Tee Liang (2002–2005) 严世良	NMP
Nominated Members of Parliament		Alexander Chan (from 2005)	NMP
Nominated Members of Parliament		Geh Min (from 2005) 倪敏	NMP
Nominated Members of Parliament		Lawrence Leow (from 2005) 廖振兴	NMP
Nominated Members of Parliament		Loo Choon Yong (from 2005) 吕俊旸	NMP
Nominated Members of Parliament		Eunice Olsen (from 2005)	NMP
Nominated Members of Parliament		Ong Soh Khim (from 2005) 王素琴	NMP
Nominated Members of Parliament		Ivan Png (from 2005) 方博亮	NMP
Nominated Members of Parliament		Tan Sze Wee (from 2005) 陈氏伟	NMP
Nominated Members of Parliament		Teo Yock Ngee (from 2005)	NMP
