= Women in Singaporean politics =

Historically, women's involvement in Singapore's political landscape was limited. However, since 1984, there has been a steady rise in female participation, with more women contesting elections across both ruling and opposition parties, as well as taking on key political roles.

== History of women in Singaporean politics ==
Singapore has practised universal suffrage from the outset of its democratic elections, unlike countries such as the United Kingdom and the United States. Early women representatives in the Legislative Council were mostly English-educated and middle-class. As women voters increased from 8 percent to 50 percent in 1955, Chinese-educated women leaders gained prominence. Some, including Linda Chen Mock Hock, were linked to communism and were later suppressed under Lim Yew Hock's anti-communist administration.

In 1959, four female People's Action Party (PAP) candidates, including Chan Choy Siong and Ho Puay Choo, entered the Assembly. Two women later defected to Barisan Sosialis. After Chan's retirement in 1970, there was a 14-year absence of women in parliament. Female representation returned in 1984 with Dixie Tan, Aline Wong, and Yu-Foo Yee Shoon of the PAP. By 1988, four women were in parliament, but numbers dropped after 1991. From 2011, the number of women candidates and MPs steadily grew. The PAP Women's Wing was formed in 1989. In 1992, Kanwaljit Soin became the first female Nominated Member of Parliament, followed by others like Eunice Olsen, Claire Chiang, Braema Mathiaparanam and Yip Pin Xiu.

Female politicians have since held higher office. Grace Fu became the first female Leader of the House in 2015, while Lim Hwee Hua was Singapore’s first female Cabinet minister in 2009, though she lost her seat to the Workers' Party (WP) in 2011. That same election saw the entry of WP's Sylvia Lim as the first elected female opposition MP, and Lina Loh as an NCMP. In 2013, WP's Lee Li Lian became the first female opposition MP to be elected in a SMC, though she lost her seat in 2015, while Halimah Yacob became the first female Speaker and later, in 2017, the first female President. In 2020, Josephine Teo led a PAP team as anchor minister, while WP gained ground with He Ting Ru and Raeesah Khan, the latter being the youngest and first minority opposition MP. Hazel Poa of the Progress Singapore Party became the third female NCMP, though she later lost her seat. In 2025, WP retained its female MPs He and Lim, and added Eileen Chong as the fourth female NCMP.

The table below shows the comparison and number of female candidates who contested over the years since the first post-independence election in 1968, and eventually elected in office:

Year	Number of female candidates			Representation		Remarks
Year	PAP	Opposition	Total	Seats	Percentage	Remarks
2025	29/32	2/21	31/53	31/97	31.96%	Excluding one NCMP.
2020	24/25	3/15	27/40	27/93	29.03%	Excluding one NCMP. Two female MPs later resigned from Parliament.
2015	20/20	1/15	21/35	21/89	23.59%	
2011	18/20	1/15	19/35	19/87	21.84%	Excluding one NCMP, and one MP-elect in a 2013 by-election.
2006	18/18	0/4	18/22	18/84	21.42%	Excluding one NCMP.
2001	10/10	0/1	10/11	10/84	11.90%	
1997	4/4	0/0	4/4	4/83	4.82%	
1991	2/3	0/2	2/5	2/81	2.47%	
1988	4/4	0/5	4/9	4/81	4.94%	
1984	3/3	0/3	3/6	3/79	3.80%	
1980	0/0	0/2	0/2	0/75	0.00%	
1976	0/0	0/1	0/1	0/69	0.00%	Amnah Kuong Hussein of the Singapore Malay National Organisation (PKMS) contested in the Geylang Serai Constituency.
1972	0/0	0/1	0/1	0/65	0.00%	Normah Yahya of the WP contested in the Changi Constituency.
1968	1/1	0/0	1/1	1/58	1.72%	Chan Choy Siong of the PAP contested in the Delta Constituency and was re-elected unopposed; later retired in 1970.

== Current women parliamentarians ==
Since the 1990s, the number of women participating in politics has progressively increased, and it hit double digits towards the 3rd millennium and the representation for female MPs increase per every election. There are currently 31 elected women parliamentarians out of a total of 97 elected members. The list of women parliamentarians are listed in alphabetical order by surnames.

=== Distribution ===
Level	Number	Names
Cabinet Ministers (including second ministers and ministers-in-charge)	4	Grace Fu, Indranee Rajah, Sim Ann, Josephine Teo
Senior Ministers of State (including acting cabinet ministers)	3	Jasmin Lau, Low Yen Ling, Sun Xueling
Ministers of State	2	Gan Siow Huang, Rahayu Mahzam
Senior Parliamentary Secretaries	1	Goh Hanyan
District mayors	2	Low Yen Ling, Denise Phua
Government backbenchers	18	
Opposition parties (excluding Non-constituency MPs or Nominated MPs)	2	He Ting Ru, Sylvia Lim

=== Elected MPs ===
Name	Party	Constituency (division)	Terms	Remarks
Elysa Chen	PAP	Bishan–Toa Payoh GRC (Bishan East-Sin Ming)	1	
Charlene Chen	PAP	Tampines GRC (Tampines East)	1	
Choo Pei Ling	PAP	Chua Chu Kang GRC (Tengah)	1	
Grace Fu	PAP	Jurong East–Bukit Batok GRC (Yuhua)	5	Cabinet Minister (Sustainability and the Environment); Minister-in-charge (Trade Relations)
Gan Siow Huang	PAP	Marymount SMC	2	Minister of State (Energy, Trade and Industry/Foreign Affairs)
Gho Sze Kee	PAP	Mountbatten SMC	1	
Goh Hanyan	PAP	Nee Soon GRC (Nee Soon Central)	1	Senior Parliamentary Secretary (Culture, Community and Youth/Sustainability and the Environment)
Hazlina Abdul Halim	PAP	East Coast GRC (Fengshan)	1	
He Ting Ru	WP	Sengkang GRC (Buangkok/Sengkang Central)	2	
Indranee Rajah	PAP	Pasir Ris–Changi GRC (Pasir Ris West)	6	Cabinet Minister (Prime Minister's Office); Second Minister (Finance/National Development); Assistant Minister-in-charge (National Population and Talent Division); Leader of the House
Jasmin Lau	PAP	Ang Mo Kio GRC (Seletar-Serangoon)	1	Acting Cabinet Minister (Manpower); Senior Minister of State (Digital Development and Information)
Lee Hui Ying	PAP	Nee Soon GRC (Nee Soon South)	1	
Valerie Lee	PAP	Pasir Ris–Changi GRC (Changi)	1	
Cassandra Lee	PAP	West Coast–Jurong West GRC (Ayer Rajah)	1	
Sylvia Lim	WP	Aljunied GRC (Paya Lebar)	4 (Note: In addition to one term as NCMP.)	
Low Yen Ling	PAP	Bukit Gombak SMC	4	Senior Minister of State (Culture, Community & Youth/Energy, Trade and Industry); Mayor (South West CDC)
Mariam Jaafar	PAP	Sembawang GRC (Woodlands)	2	
Nadia Ahmad Samdin	PAP	Ang Mo Kio GRC (Cheng San)	2	
Rachel Ong	PAP	Tanjong Pagar GRC (Telok Blangah)	2	
Diana Pang	PAP	Marine Parade–Braddell Heights GRC (Geylang Serai)	1	
Joan Pereira	PAP	Tanjong Pagar GRC (Henderson-Dawson)	3	
Denise Phua	PAP	Jalan Besar GRC (Kampong Glam)	5	Mayor (Central CDC)
Poh Li San	PAP	Sembawang West SMC	2	
Rahayu Mahzam	PAP	Jurong East–Bukit Batok GRC (Bukit Batok East)	3	Minister of State (Digital Development and Information/Health)
Sim Ann	PAP	Holland–Bukit Timah GRC (Bukit Timah)	4	Second Cabinet Minister (Foreign Affairs/Home Affairs); Deputy Whip (PAP)
Hany Soh	PAP	Marsiling–Yew Tee GRC (Woodgrove)	2	
Sun Xueling	PAP	Punggol GRC (Punggol West)	3	Senior Minister of State (Energy, Trade and Industry/National Development)
Jessica Tan	PAP	East Coast GRC (Changi-Simei)	5	
Josephine Teo	PAP	Jalan Besar GRC (Kreta Ayer-Kim Seng)	5	Cabinet Minister (Digital Development and Information); Minister-in-charge (Cybersecurity and Smart Nation Group)
Tin Pei Ling	PAP	Marine Parade–Braddell Heights GRC (MacPherson)	4	
Yeo Wan Ling	PAP	Punggol GRC (Punggol Coast)	2	

=== NCMPs ===
Name	Party	Terms
Eileen Chong	WP	1

=== NMPs ===
Name	Terms	Occupation
Kuah Boon Theng	1	Medical lawyer
