= 11th Parliament of Singapore =

Singaporean parliamentary meeting

←	10th	12th	→
Composition as of 18 January 2007
Government:
PAP (82)
Opposition:
WP (2)
SDA (1)
NMP (9)

Overview
- Legislative body: Parliament of Singapore
- Meeting place: Parliament House
- Term: 2 November 2006 – 19 April 2011 (4 years, 5 months and 17 days)
- Election: 6 May 2006
- Government: People's Action Party
- Opposition: Workers' Party; Singapore Democratic Alliance

Parliament of Singapore
- Members: 84 + 1 NCMP + 9 NMPs
- Speaker: Abdullah Tarmugi
- Leader of the House: Wong Kan Seng (until 2007); Mah Bow Tan (from 2007)
- Prime Minister: Lee Hsien Loong
- Leader of the Opposition: Low Thia Khiang
- Party control: PAP supermajority

Sessions
- 1st: 2 November 2006 – 13 April 2009 (2 years, 5 months and 11 days)
- 2nd: 18 May 2009 – 19 April 2011 (1 year, 11 months and 1 day)

The 11th Parliament of Singapore was a meeting of the Parliament of Singapore. The first session commenced on 2 November 2006 and was prorogued on 13 April 2009. The second session commenced on 18 May 2009 and was dissolved on 19 April 2011, with the final sitting held on 11 April.

The members of the Eleventh Parliament were elected in the 2006 general election. Parliament was controlled by a People's Action Party majority, led by Prime Minister Lee Hsien Loong and his Cabinet. Abdullah Tarmugi was re-elected as the Speaker of the House on 2 November 2006. The de facto Leader of the Opposition was Low Thia Khiang of the Workers' Party.

Two seats fell vacant during the Eleventh Parliament with the deaths of Jurong GRC MP Ong Chit Chung in 2008 and Ang Mo Kio GRC MP Balaji Sadasivan in 2010, who was also the Senior Minister of State for Foreign Affairs. They would remain vacant until the end of the term.

== Results of the 2006 general election ==
Party	Votes	%	Seats	+/–
People's Action Party	748,130	66.60	82	Steady
Workers' Party	183,578	16.34	2	▲1
Singapore Democratic Alliance	145,628	12.96	1	▼1
Singapore Democratic Party	45,937	4.09	0	Steady
Total	1,123,273	100.00	85	Steady
Valid votes	1,123,273	97.68		
Invalid/blank votes	26,730	2.32		
Total votes	1,150,003	100.00		
Registered voters/turnout	2,159,721	94.00		
Source: Singapore Elections

== Officeholders ==
=== Speakers ===
- Speaker: Abdullah Tarmugi (East Coast GRC, PAP)
- Deputy Speaker:
  - Indranee Rajah (Tanjong Pagar GRC, PAP), from 8 November 2006
  - Matthias Yao (MacPherson SMC, PAP), from 8 November 2006

=== Leaders ===
- Prime Minister: Lee Hsien Loong (Ang Mo Kio GRC, PAP)
- Leader of the Opposition: Low Thia Khiang (Hougang SMC, WP)

=== House Leaders ===
- Leader of the House:
  - Wong Kan Seng (Bishan–Toa Payoh GRC, PAP), until 31 March 2007
  - Mah Bow Tan (Tampines GRC, PAP), from 1 April 2007
- Deputy Leader of the House:
  - Mah Bow Tan (Tampines GRC, PAP), until 31 March 2007
  - Ng Eng Hen (Bishan–Toa Payoh GRC, PAP), from 1 April 2007

=== Whips ===
- Government Party Whip:
  - Lee Boon Yang (Jalan Besar GRC, PAP), until 31 March 2007
  - Lim Swee Say (Holland–Bukit Timah GRC, PAP), from 1 April 2007
- Deputy Government Party Whip:
  - Inderjit Singh (Ang Mo Kio GRC, PAP)
  - Lim Swee Say (Holland–Bukit Timah GRC, PAP), until 30 May 2007
  - Amy Khor (Hong Kah GRC), from 1 April 2007

== Composition ==
Political party	Members	
Political party	At election	At dissolution
PAP	82	80
Workers' Party	1 + 1 NCMP	1 + 1 NCMP
Singapore Democratic Alliance	1	0
Singapore People's Party	0	1
Nominated Members of Parliament	0	9
Vacant seats	9	2
Total	94	94
Government majority	80	78

== Members ==
Constituency	Division	Member	Party
Aljunied GRC	Aljunied–Hougang	Yeo Guat Kwang 杨木光	PAP
Aljunied GRC	Bedok Reservoir–Punggol	George Yeo 杨荣文	PAP
Aljunied GRC	Eunos	Zainul Abidin زین العابدین	PAP
Aljunied GRC	Paya Lebar	Cynthia Phua 潘惜玉	PAP
Aljunied GRC	Serangoon	Lim Hwee Hua 林陈惠华	PAP
Ang Mo Kio GRC	Cheng San–Seletar	Balaji Sadasivan (until 2010) (Note: Balaji Sadasivan died from colorectal cancer on 27 September 2010.) பாலாஜி சதாசிவன்	PAP
Ang Mo Kio GRC	Jalan Kayu	Wee Siew Kim 黃守金	PAP
Ang Mo Kio GRC	Kebun Baru	Inderjit Singh ਇੰਦਰਜੀਤ ਸਿੰਘ	PAP
Ang Mo Kio GRC	Nee Soon South	Lee Bee Wah 李美花	PAP
Ang Mo Kio GRC	Sengkang West	Lam Pin Min 蓝彬明	PAP
Ang Mo Kio GRC	Teck Ghee	Lee Hsien Loong 李显龙	PAP
Bishan–Toa Payoh GRC	Bishan East	Wong Kan Seng 黄根成	PAP
Bishan–Toa Payoh GRC	Bishan North	Zainudin Nordin زاينودين نوردين	PAP
Bishan–Toa Payoh GRC	Thomson	Leong Horn Kee 梁汉基	PAP
Bishan–Toa Payoh GRC	Toa Payoh Central	Ng Eng Hen 黄永宏	PAP
Bishan–Toa Payoh GRC	Toa Payoh East	Davinder Singh ਦਵਿੰਦਰ ਸਿੰਘ	PAP
Bukit Panjang SMC		Teo Ho Pin 张俰宾	PAP
East Coast GRC	Bedok	S. Jayakumar எஸ். செயக்குமார்	PAP
East Coast GRC	Changi–Simei	Jessica Tan 陈舜娘	PAP
East Coast GRC	Fengshan	Raymond Lim 林双吉	PAP
East Coast GRC	Kampong Chai Chee	Lee Yi Shyan 李奕贤	PAP
East Coast GRC	Siglap	Abdullah Tarmugi عبد الله موعي	PAP
Holland–Bukit Timah GRC	Bukit Timah	Yu-Foo Yee Shoon 于符喜泉	PAP
Holland–Bukit Timah GRC	Buona Vista	Lim Swee Say 林瑞生	PAP
Holland–Bukit Timah GRC	Cashew	Vivian Balakrishnan விவியன் பாலகிருஷ்ணன்	PAP
Holland–Bukit Timah GRC	Ulu Pandan	Christopher de Souza	PAP
Holland–Bukit Timah GRC	Zhenghua	Gan Kim Yong 颜金勇	PAP
Hong Kah GRC	Bukit Gombak	Ang Mong Seng 洪茂诚	PAP
Hong Kah GRC	Hong Kah North	Amy Khor 许连碹	PAP
Hong Kah GRC	Keat Hong	Zaqy Mohamad زاقي محمد	PAP
Hong Kah GRC	Nanyang	Alvin Yeo 杨康海	PAP
Hong Kah GRC	Yew Tee	Yeo Cheow Tong 姚照东	PAP
Hougang SMC		Low Thia Khiang 刘程强	WP
Jalan Besar GRC	Jalan Besar	Lee Boon Yang 李文献	PAP
Jalan Besar GRC	Kampong Glam	Denise Phua 潘丽萍	PAP
Jalan Besar GRC	Kolam Ayer	Yaacob Ibrahim يعقوب إبراهيم	PAP
Jalan Besar GRC	Kreta Ayer–Kim Seng	Lily Neo 梁莉莉	PAP
Jalan Besar GRC	Whampoa	Heng Chee How 王志豪	PAP
Joo Chiat SMC		Chan Soo Sen 曾士生	PAP
Jurong GRC	Bukit Batok	Ong Chit Chung(until 2008) (Note: Ong Chit Chung died on 14 July 2008 from heart cancer.) 翁执中	PAP
Jurong GRC	Bukit Batok East	Halimah Yacob حاليمه ياچوب	PAP
Jurong GRC	Jurong Central	Lim Boon Heng 林文兴	PAP
Jurong GRC	Taman Jurong	Tharman Shanmugaratnam தர்மன் சண்முகரத்னம்	PAP
Jurong GRC	Yuhua	Grace Fu 傅海燕	PAP
MacPherson SMC		Matthias Yao 姚智	PAP
Marine Parade GRC	Braddell Heights	Seah Kian Peng 谢健平	PAP
Marine Parade GRC	Geylang Serai	Fatimah Lateef فاطمة لطيف	PAP
Marine Parade GRC	Kaki Bukit	Faishal Ibrahim فيصل إبراهيم	PAP
Marine Parade GRC	Kampong Ubi–Kembangan	Ong Seh Hong 王世丰	PAP
Marine Parade GRC	Marine Parade	Goh Chok Tong 吴作栋	PAP
Marine Parade GRC	Mountbatten	Lim Biow Chuan 林谋泉	PAP
Nee Soon Central SMC		Ong Ah Heng 王雅兴	PAP
Nee Soon East SMC		Ho Peng Kee 何炳基	PAP
Pasir Ris–Punggol GRC	Pasir Ris East	Ahmad Magad أحمد ماعاد	PAP
Pasir Ris–Punggol GRC	Pasir Ris West	Teo Chee Hean 张志贤	PAP
Pasir Ris–Punggol GRC	Punggol Central	Charles Chong 张有福	PAP
Pasir Ris–Punggol GRC	Punggol East	Michael Palmer	PAP
Pasir Ris–Punggol GRC	Punggol North	Penny Low 刘𨮒琳	PAP
Pasir Ris–Punggol GRC	Punggol South	Teo Ser Luck 张思乐	PAP
Potong Pasir SMC		Chiam See Tong 詹时中	SDA (Note: Chiam See Tong was a member of the Singapore People's Party, which was affiliated with the Singapore Democratic Alliance until 2 March 2011.)
Sembawang GRC	Admiralty	Maliki Osman مالكي عثمان	PAP
Sembawang GRC	Canberra	Lim Wee Kiak 林伟杰	PAP
Sembawang GRC	Chong Pang	K. Shanmugam கா. சண்முகம்	PAP
Sembawang GRC	Marsiling	Hawazi Daipi هاوازي دايڤي	PAP
Sembawang GRC	Sembawang	Khaw Boon Wan 许文远	PAP
Sembawang GRC	Woodlands	Ellen Lee 李玉云	PAP
Tampines GRC	Tampines Central	Sin Boon Ann 陈文安	PAP
Tampines GRC	Tampines Changkat	Irene Ng 伍碧虹	PAP
Tampines GRC	Tampines East	Mah Bow Tan 马宝山	PAP
Tampines GRC	Tampines North	Ong Kian Min 王建明	PAP
Tampines GRC	Tampines West	Masagos Zulkifli ماسڬوس ذوالكفل	PAP
Tanjong Pagar GRC	Moulmein	Lui Tuck Yew 吕德耀	PAP
Tanjong Pagar GRC	Queenstown	Baey Yam Keng 马炎庆	PAP
Tanjong Pagar GRC	Radin Mas	Sam Tan 陈振泉	PAP
Tanjong Pagar GRC	Tanglin–Cairnhill	Indranee Rajah இந்திராணி ராஜா	PAP
Tanjong Pagar GRC	Tanjong Pagar	Lee Kuan Yew 李光耀	PAP
Tanjong Pagar GRC	Tiong Bahru	Koo Tsai Kee 顾蔡矶	PAP
West Coast GRC	Boon Lay	Ho Geok Choo 何玉珠	PAP
West Coast GRC	Clementi	Arthur Fong 邝臻	PAP
West Coast GRC	Pioneer	Cedric Foo 符致镜	PAP
West Coast GRC	Telok Blangah	Lim Hng Kiang 林勋强	PAP
West Coast GRC	West Coast–Ayer Rajah	S. Iswaran எஸ். ஈஸ்வரன்	PAP
Yio Chu Kang SMC		Seng Han Thong 成汉通	PAP
Non-constituency Member of Parliament		Sylvia Lim 林瑞莲	WP
Nominated Members of Parliament		Gautam Banerjee (2007–2009) গৌতম বন্দ্যোপাধ্যায়	NMP
Nominated Members of Parliament		Cham Hui Fong (2007–2009) 詹惠风	NMP
Nominated Members of Parliament		Edwin Khew (2007–2009) 邱德福	NMP
Nominated Members of Parliament		Loo Choon Yong (2007–2009) 吕俊旸	NMP
Nominated Members of Parliament		Kalyani Mehta (2007–2009) કલ્યાણી મહેતા	NMP
Nominated Members of Parliament		Eunice Olsen (2007–2009)	NMP
Nominated Members of Parliament		Jessie Phua (2007–2009) 潘黄伟珍	NMP
Nominated Members of Parliament		Siew Kum Hong (2007–2009) 萧锦鸿	NMP
Nominated Members of Parliament		Thio Li-ann (2007–2009) 张黎衍	NMP
Nominated Members of Parliament		Calvin Cheng (from 2009) 郑恩里	NMP
Nominated Members of Parliament		Terry Lee (from 2009) 李国华	NMP
Nominated Members of Parliament		Paulin Tay Straughan (from 2009)	NMP
Nominated Members of Parliament		Mildred Tan (from 2009) 陈沈明媚	NMP
Nominated Members of Parliament		Teo Siong Seng (from 2009) 张松声	NMP
Nominated Members of Parliament		Viswa Sadasivan (from 2009) വിശ്വ സദാശിവൻ	NMP
Nominated Members of Parliament		Laurence Wee (from 2009)	NMP
Nominated Members of Parliament		Audrey Wong (from 2009)	NMP
Nominated Members of Parliament		Joscelin Yeo (from 2009) 杨玮玲	NMP
