= Politics of Singapore =

Singapore is a representative democratic parliamentary republic in which the president is the head of state and the prime minister is the head of government. It has a multi-party system. Executive power is exercised mainly by the Cabinet, composed of Members of Parliament (MPs), and to a lesser extent, the president. The Cabinet has the general direction and control of the government and is accountable to Parliament. There are three separate branches of government: the legislature, executive and judiciary, resembling the Westminster system.

Legislative power is vested in both the government and the Parliament of Singapore. The parliament is the national legislature, consisting of the president as its head and a single chamber whose members are elected by popular vote. The presidency, as the position of the head of state, has historically been largely ceremonial, although the constitution was amended in 1991 to give it limited veto powers in a few key decisions, e.g. the use of the national reserves and the appointment of key posts in the judiciary, the civil service and the Singapore Armed Forces (SAF). The president also exercises powers over civil service appointments and national security matters.

Singapore has been described as a de facto one-party state, having been governed by the People's Action Party (PAP) since 1959. In the last general election held in 2025, the PAP won its 16th consecutive term in government with 87 out of 97 seats and 65.57% of the popular vote.

== Political background ==
=== Domination of the People's Action Party (PAP) ===
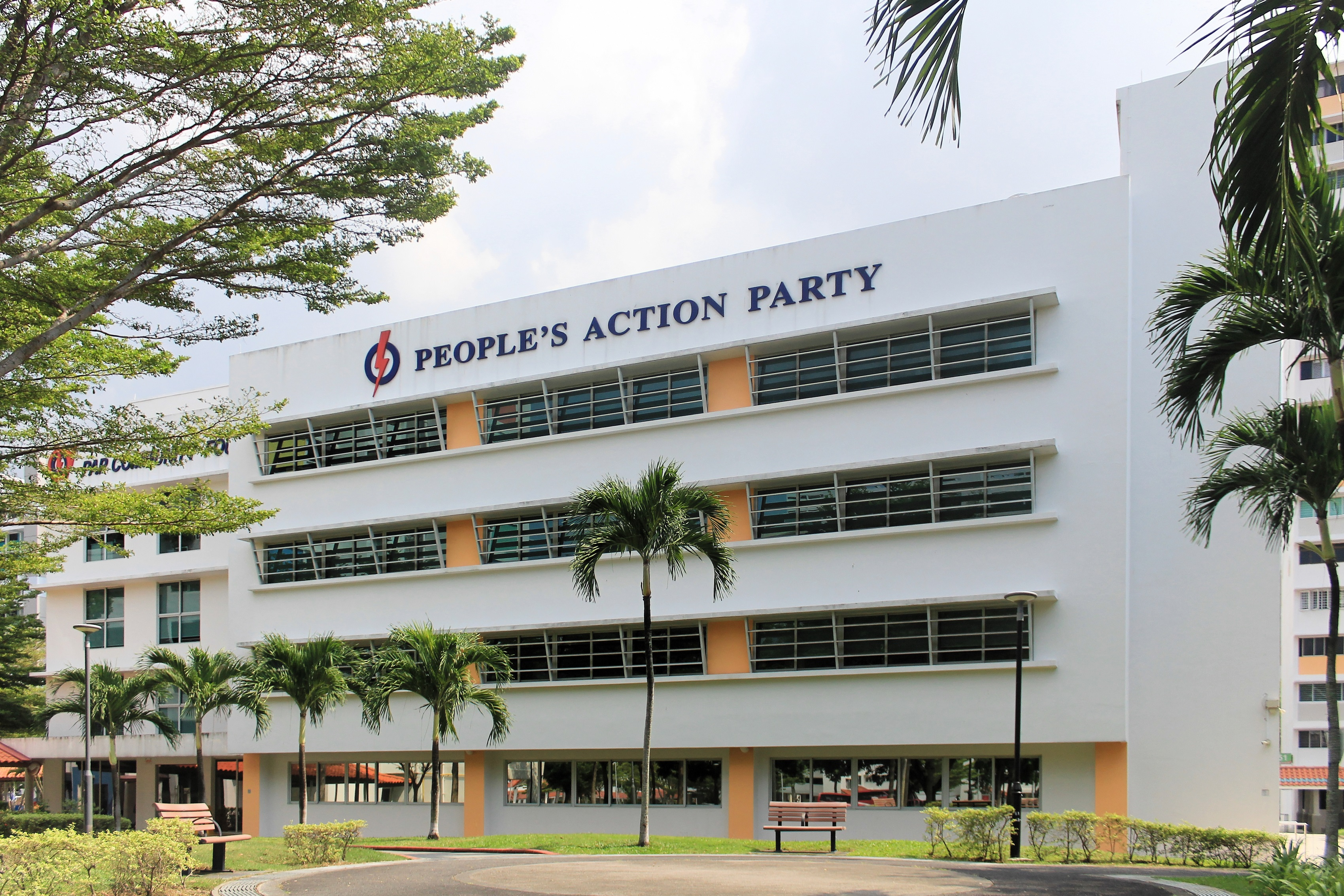
Headquarters of the People's Action Party (PAP)

Singaporean politics have been dominated by the People's Action Party (PAP) since the 1959 general election, when Lee Kuan Yew became Singapore's first prime minister while it was still a self-governing colony within the British Empire. The PAP has been the only ruling party to form the government since then. Under the Malaysia Agreement, Singapore briefly entered Malaysia as a state in 1963 but became independent in 1965 after separation. During Singapore's time in Malaysia, the PAP was the state government and often clashed with the federal government, which was then led by UMNO as part of the Alliance Party.

To a large extent, "bread-and-butter" politics are used to maintain ideological hegemony, and reflect the basic materialistic orientation of Singapore politics. Opposition parties are used to contesting the PAP under these similar parameters. In spite of the ideological hegemony, a survey by Pew Research has demonstrated an increase in perceived political division between people who support different political parties since 2021. In the last general election, the PAP won 87 out of 97 elected seats in the Parliament of Singapore. The remaining seats were won by the Workers' Party (WP), which won 10 elected seats along with two non-constituency seats.

=== Reception ===
Singapore has consistently been rated as the least-corrupt country in Asia and amongst the top ten cleanest in the world by Transparency International. The World Bank's governance indicators have also rated Singapore highly on rule of law, control of corruption and government effectiveness. Despite these achievements, the PAP's long-standing governance has drawn scrutiny from international metrics regarding the extent of civil liberties, political pluralism, and labour rights. The Economist Democracy Index rated Singapore as a "flawed democracy" in 2025. Freedom House deemed Singapore "partly free" in 2025, at 48/100 — 19/40 for political rights, 29/60 for civil liberties.

== Political climate ==
=== Factors ===
==== Judiciary ====
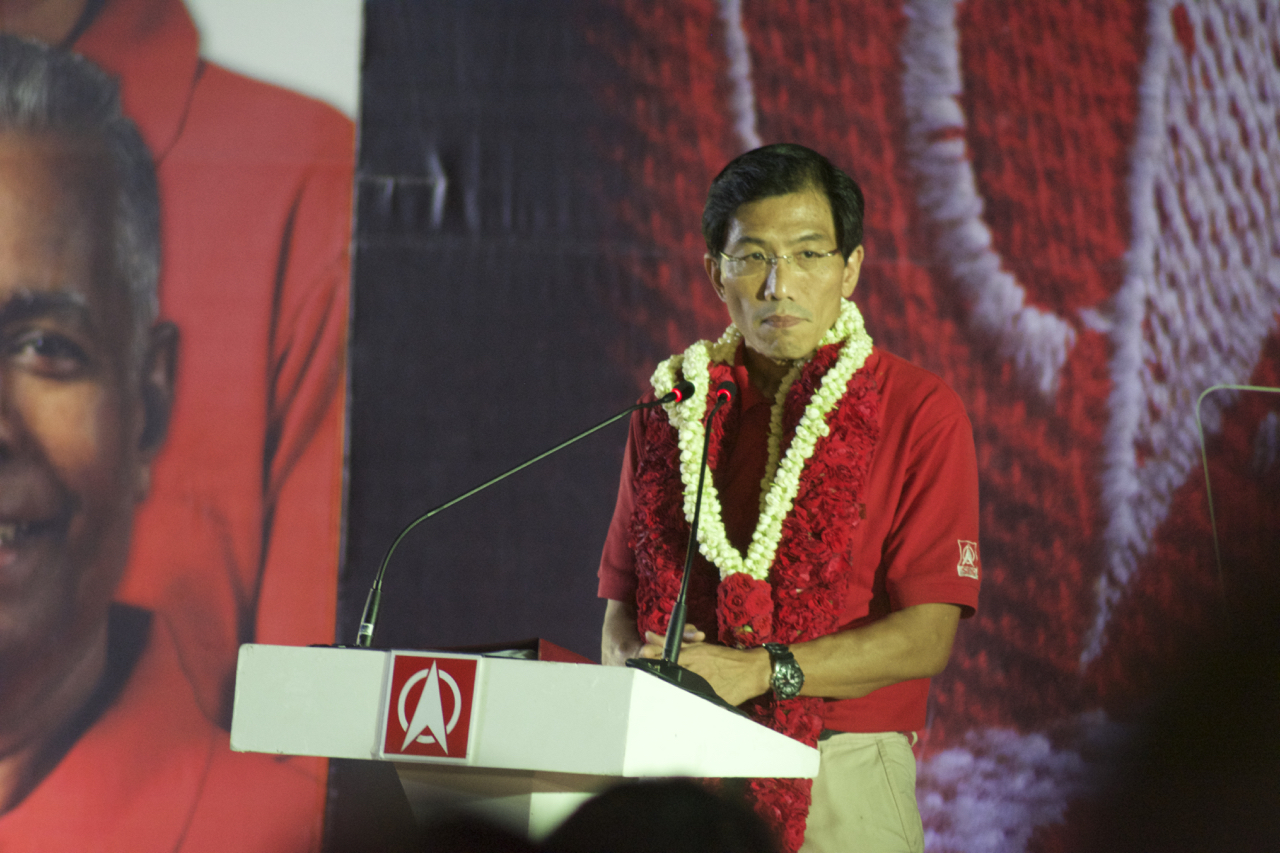
Chee Soon Juan

Scholars analysing the sustained hegemony of the PAP often characterise Singapore as an outlier among nominal liberal democracies due to its administrative longevity and the specific mechanisms employed to maintain political dominance. A primary factor cited in this discourse is the strategic use of defamation lawsuits against high-profile political opponents, which frequently results in bankruptcy and subsequent disqualification from parliamentary candidacy. This pattern is exemplified by the legal proceedings against former Workers' Party (WP) leader J. B. Jeyaretnam and Singapore Democratic Party (SDP) leader Chee Soon Juan, who faced insolvency in 2001 and 2011 respectively following unfavourable court rulings. Beyond direct political challengers, the PAP has historically pursued legal recourse against journalists and bloggers whose critiques are deemed to undermine the integrity of the ruling party. Consequently, political scientists distinguish the PAP's "soft" authoritarianism from "harder" variants seen around the world that would often rely on electoral fraud or violent purges, noting that the PAP instead leverages the judiciary to marginalise dissenters while hosting free elections. By facilitating the legal and financial disenfranchisement of critics, the PAP effectively renders opposition figures as social pariahs, thereby significantly raising the personal and professional stakes of political contestation.

==== Media landscape ====
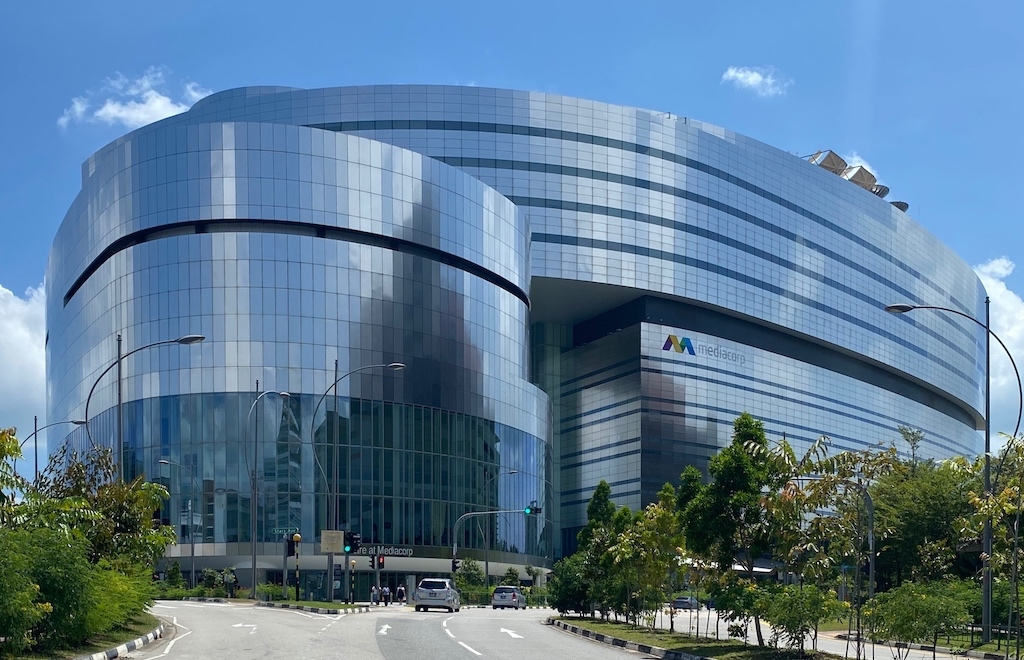
Headquarters of Mediacorp

Singapore's media landscape is tightly controlled by the PAP government, which maintains strict regulations and oversight over press and broadcast content. The government exercises control through licensing laws, majority ownership of major media outlets such as Mediacorp and SPH Media Trust, consequently creating a climate where self-censorship is widespread. Journalists and editors often avoid controversial topics or criticism of government policies to maintain compliance, job security or avoid potential legal repercussions. As a result, while Singapore's media is known for its polished and orderly presentation, it often lacks the investigative depth and critical scrutiny found in more liberal media environments, particularly of local politics. In 2019, the Protection from Online Falsehoods and Manipulation Act (POFMA) was enacted, which allows the government to order corrections or removals of online content it deems "false and harmful". While the government defends it as a tool to protect public interest, critics argue it grants excessive power to authorities, risks censorship, and has highlighted its chilling effect on free speech and democratic discourse. Reporters Without Borders ranked Singapore 123rd in the world for press freedoms in 2025, citing the tight media landscape as well as lawsuits against political opponents, along with attempts at making critical journalists unemployable.

==== State resources ====
Political analysts frequently identify the strategic use of state resources as a cornerstone of the PAP electoral dominance, particularly through a classic "carrot and stick" approach involving public housing programs. Given that approximately 80% of Singaporeans reside in government-built apartments due to the country's limited land size, the prioritisation of Home Improvement Programmes (HIP) and estate upgrading serves as a potent tool for political leverage. Historical rhetoric from party leadership has reinforced this link; in 1998, prime minister Goh Chok Tong explicitly stated that tying upgrading priorities to electoral support was intended to "focus the minds of voters" on the benefits of government policies. This sentiment persisted into the 21st century, with prime minister Lee Hsien Loong remarking in 2011 that a distinction in housing benefits must exist between constituencies that elect PAP MPs and those that elect opposition MPs. Critics argue that such policies foster a "climate of fear," wherein voters perceive that electing opposition representatives will result in the deliberate neglect or degradation of their living environments, thereby institutionalising a systemic disadvantage for political challengers.

==== Electoral boundaries ====
The boundaries of electoral constituencies in Singapore are also decided by the Elections Department, which is under the control of the Prime Minister's Office. Electoral boundaries are redrawn just a few weeks before the general election, leaving little time for opposition parties to prepare. There have been accusations of gerrymandering via the dissolving and redrawing of marginal constituencies with relatively stronger opposition support, such as Cheng San GRC and Eunos GRC. The Group Representation Constituency (GRC) system, which requires teams of candidates (including at least one from a minority group) to contest in larger electoral areas, has also been criticised for making it more difficult for smaller or newer opposition parties to compete effectively. While the government maintains that these changes are made to reflect population shifts and ensure minority representation, the lack of transparency fuels ongoing concerns about the integrity of the electoral process.

==== Local laws ====
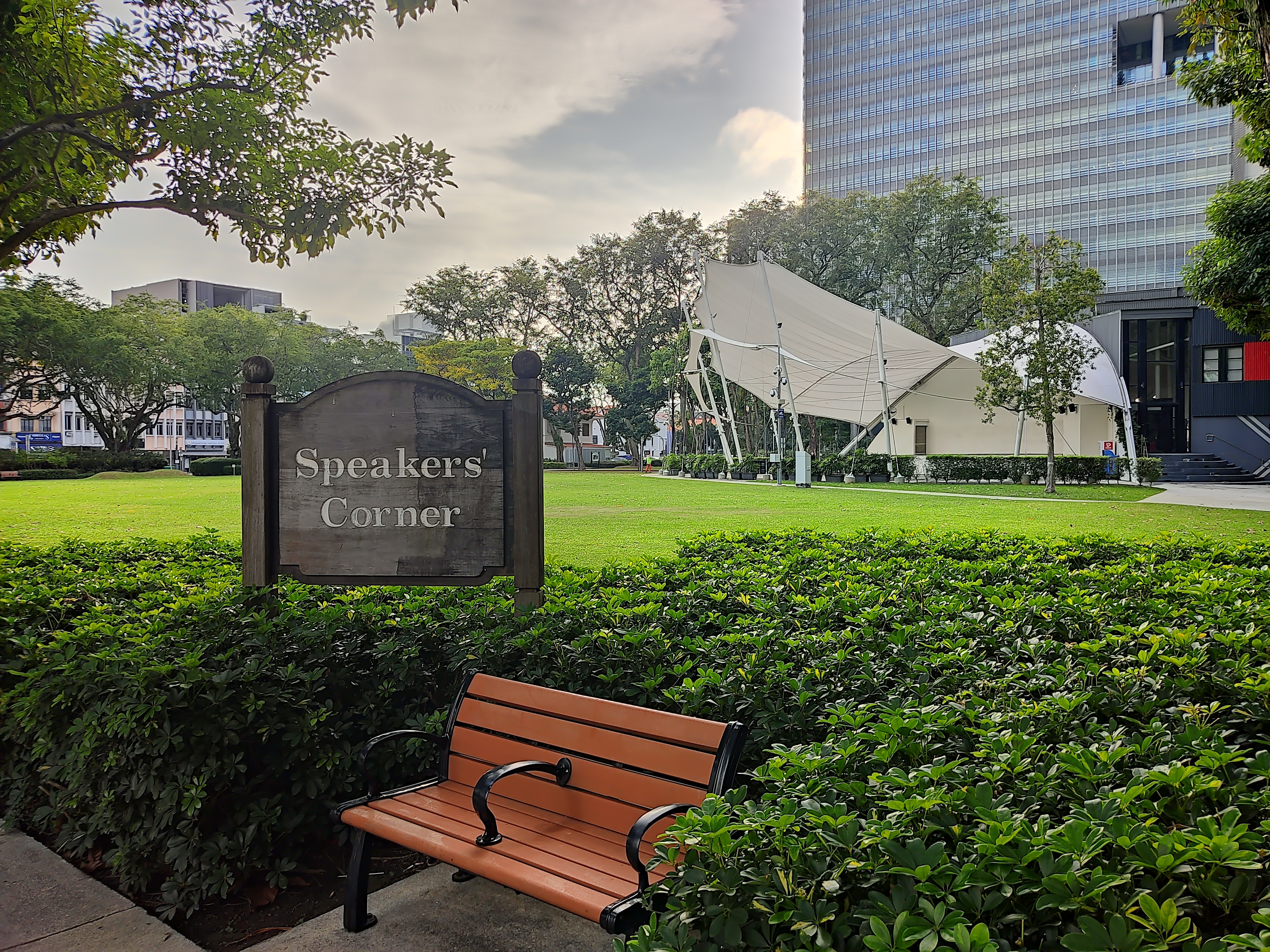
Speakers' Corner

Although Singapore's laws are largely inherited from English common law due to its history as a former colony of the British Empire, the PAP government is also critical of fully embracing liberal democratic values, which it typifies as a "Western concept" and claims that there should not be a 'one-size-fits-all' solution to a democracy. For example, laws restricting freedom of speech exist to prohibit speech that may breed ill will or cause disharmony within Singapore's multiracial, multi-religious society. For example, in 2005, three bloggers were convicted of sedition for posting racist remarks targeting minorities. In 2021, a former Ngee Ann Polytechnic senior lecturer was sentenced to five weeks' jail and a $6,000 fine for making racist remarks to an inter-ethnic couple in public.

Public demonstrations in Singapore are tightly controlled under the Public Order Act, requiring police permits for public gatherings. Even at the designated Speakers' Corner, strict rules apply and only Singapore citizens are allowed to protest there [without a permit]. The government justifies these controls as necessary for maintaining public order and harmony in a multi-ethnic society, but critics argue that the laws severely limits freedom of expression and assembly. In addition, some offences that could be deemed as minor crimes in other countries such as online scams and vandalism can lead to heavy fines or corporal punishment (caning). In addition, the death penalty for murder and drug trafficking remains in force. Some critics have also characterised PAP's rule over Singapore as a nanny state, although PAP leaders have often embraced the descriptor, viewing a paternalistic approach as a proactive way to ensure social stability and public welfare.

== Executive ==
In order to become president, the candidate:

- Must not be a member of any political party on the date of their nomination for election.
- Must have for a period of no fewer than three years held office —
  - as Minister, Chief Justice, Speaker, Attorney-General, Chairman of the Public Service Commission, Auditor-General, Accountant-General or Permanent Secretary;
  - as chief executive officer (CEO) of a key statutory board or government company: the Central Provident Fund Board, the Housing and Development Board, the Jurong Town Corporation, the Monetary Authority of Singapore, Temasek Holdings, or GIC Private Limited (formerly known as the Government of Singapore Investment Corporation);
  - as CEO of a company with an average of $500 million in shareholders' equity for the most recent three years in that office, and which is profitable after taxes; or
  - in any other similar or comparable position of seniority and responsibility in any other organisation or department of equivalent size or complexity in the public or private sector which has given him or her such experience and ability in administering and managing financial affairs as to enable him or her to carry out effectively the functions and duties of the office of President.

The president now exercises powers over the following:

- appointment of public officers
- government budgets
- examine government's exercise of its powers under the Internal Security Act
- examine government's exercise of its powers under religious harmony laws
- investigate cases of corruption

However, the president must consult the Council of Presidential Advisers before taking a decision on some of these matters. The council consists of

- two members appointed at the personal discretion of the president
- two members appointed by the president on the advice of the prime minister
- one member appointed by the president on the advice of the chief justice
- one member appointed by the president on the advice of the chairman of the Public Service Commission

A member of the council serves a six-year term and is eligible for re-appointment for further terms of four years each.

Similar to the Speech from the Throne given by the heads of state in other parliamentary systems, the president delivers an address written by the government at the opening of parliament about what kind of policies to expect in the coming year. The current president is Tharman Shanmugaratnam.

=== Cabinet ===
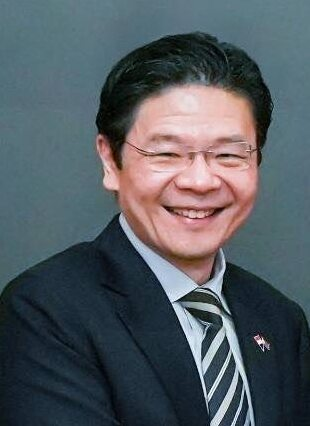
Lawrence Wong, the current prime minister of Singapore

The cabinet forms the executive of the government and it is answerable to parliament. It consist of sitting members of parliament and is headed by a prime minister, the head of government. The current prime minister is Lawrence Wong.

Neither the prime minister nor members of the cabinet are elected by parliament. The prime minister is appointed by the president, then Cabinet members, also known as ministers, are appointed by the president on the advice of the prime minister.

The cabinet in Singapore collectively decides the government's policies and has influence over lawmaking by introducing bills.

Ministers in Singapore are the highest paid politicians in the world, receiving a 60% salary raise in 2007 and as a result Prime Minister Lee Hsien Loong's pay jumped to S$3.1 million, five times the US$400,000 earned by US President Barack Obama. Although there was a public outcry regarding the high salary in comparison to the size of the country governed, the government's firm stance was that this raise was required to ensure the continued efficiency and corruption-free status of Singapore's "world-class" government. On 21 May 2011, following the 2011 general election, the Prime Minister announced that a committee would be appointed to review politicians' remuneration, and that revised salaries would take effect from that date.

== Legislative ==
=== Parliament ===
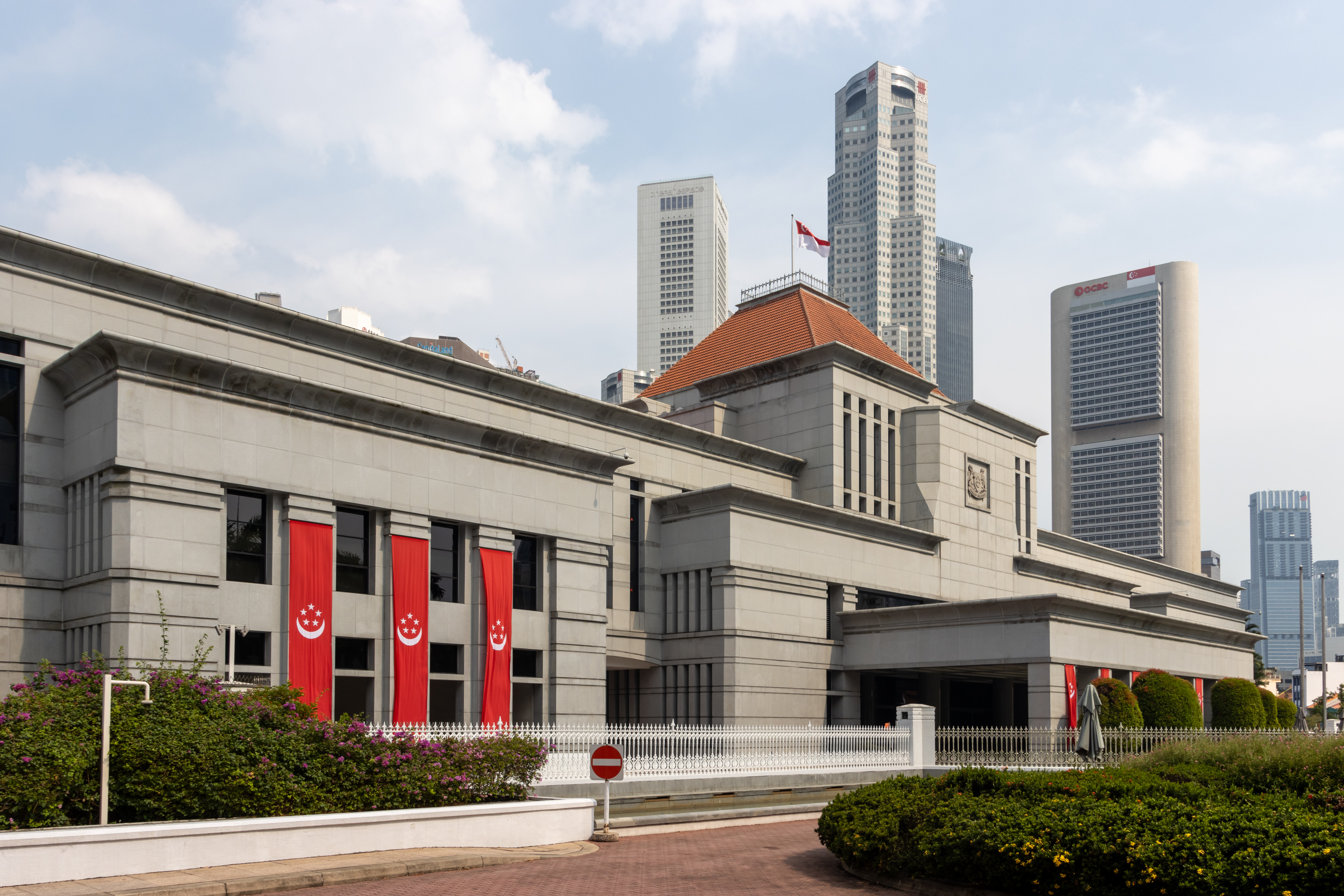
Parliament House

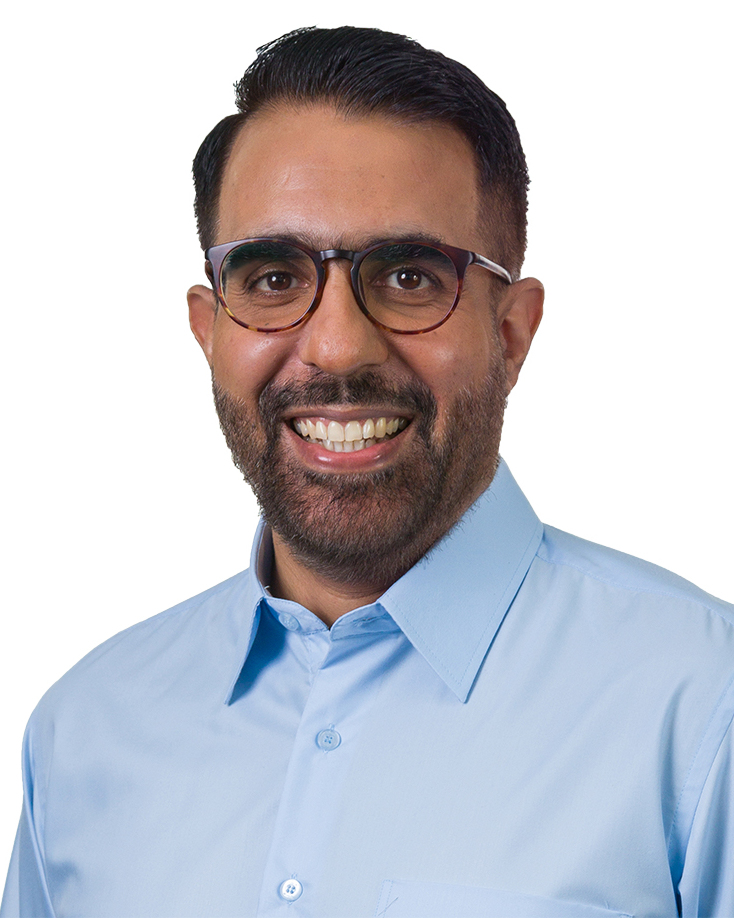
Pritam Singh, who served as the first leader of the opposition

The unicameral Singaporean parliament is the legislature in Singapore with the president as its head. Before independence in 1965, it was known as the Legislative Assembly. The maximum term of any one parliament is five years, after which a general election must be held within three months of the dissolution of parliament.

The elected members of parliament (MPs) are elected on a plurality voting basis and represent either single-member constituencies (SMCs) or group representation constituencies (GRCs). In GRCs, political parties field a team of between three and five candidates, and least one candidate in the team must belong to a minority race; in practical terms this means they must not be Chinese. Subsequently, they are elected on a general ticket. Formerly, there were no GRCs, and all constituencies of Singapore were represented by one member, but amendments to the Parliamentary Elections Act led to the creation of GRCs since the 1988 general election, thus creating a plurality voting system in the process. This development has led to some complaints from minor opposition parties that they are often unable to field one, let alone three or more candidates.

The constitution also allows for the appointment of additional members of parliament who are not elected during an election. As of 2016, up to 12 non-constituency members of parliament (NCMPs) from the opposition political parties can be appointed.

A constitutional provision for the appointment of up to nine nominated members of parliament (NMPs) was made in 1990. NMPs are appointed by the president for a term of two and a half years on the recommendation of a select committee chaired by the speaker of Parliament and are not connected to any political parties. The youngest NMP to be sworn into parliament was 26 years old, Yip Pin Xiu. NMPs cannot vote on issues such as amendment of the constitution, public funds, vote of no confidence in the government, as well as removing the president from office.

The office of the Leader of the Opposition (LO or LOTO) was formally established in the aftermath of the 2020 general election. Pritam Singh of the Workers' Party (WP) was the first to be formally designated as such, serving from 24 August 2020 until 15 January 2026.

=== Legislative process ===
Before any law is passed, it is first introduced in parliament as a draft known as a bill. Bills are usually introduced by a minister on behalf of the cabinet, known as government bills. However, any member of parliament can introduce a bill, known as a private member's bill. All bills must go through three readings in parliament and receive the president's assent to become an act of Parliament.

Each bill goes through several stages before it becomes a law. The first stage is a mere formality known as the first reading, where it is introduced without a debate. This is followed by the second reading, where members of parliament debate on the general principles of the bill. If parliament opposes the bill, it may vote to reject the bill.

If the bill goes through the second reading, the bill is sent to a select committee where every clause in the bill is examined. Members of parliament who support the bill in principle but do not agree with certain clauses can propose amendments to those clauses at this stage. Following its report back to parliament, the bill will go through its third reading where only minor amendments will be allowed before it is passed.

Most bills passed by parliament are scrutinised by the Presidential Council for Minority Rights which makes a report to the speaker of Parliament stating whether there are clauses in a bill which affects any racial or religious community. If approved by the council, the bill will be presented for the president's assent.

The last stage involves the granting of assent by the president, before the bill officially becomes a law.

=== Constitution ===
The Constitution of Singapore is the supreme law of Singapore and it is a codified constitution.

The constitution cannot be amended without the support of more than two-thirds of the members of parliament on the second and third readings. The president may seek opinion on constitutional issues from a tribunal consisting of not less than three judges of the Supreme Court. Singaporean courts, like the courts in Australia, cannot offer advisory opinion on the constitutionality of laws.

Part IV of the constitution guarantees the following:

1. liberty of a person
2. prohibition of slavery and forced labour
3. protection against retrospective criminal laws and repeated trials
4. equal protection
5. prohibition of banishment and freedom of movement
6. freedom of speech, assembly and association
7. freedom of religion
8. right to education

The sections on liberty of the person and freedoms of speech, assembly, movement, association and religion are all qualified by allowing Parliament to restrict those freedoms for reasons including national security, public health, and "public order or morality". In practice, the courts have given complete discretion to the government in imposing such restrictions.

Part XII of the constitution allows the Parliament of Singapore to enact legislation designed to stop or prevent subversion. Such legislation is valid even if it is inconsistent with Part IV of the constitution. The Internal Security Act (ISA) is a legislation under such provision. In 1966, Chia Thye Poh was detained under the ISA and was imprisoned for 23 years without trial. Afterwards, he was placed under conditions of house arrest for another nine years on the island of Sentosa.

== Elections and political parties ==
Voting has been compulsory in Singapore since 1959 and there is universal suffrage. The legal voting age is 21. The Elections Department Singapore (ELD) is responsible for the planning, preparation and conduct of presidential and parliamentary elections and of any national referendum in Singapore. It is a department under the Prime Minister's Office (PMO).

Paper ballots are used in Singapore. Voting is secret, while ballot papers have serial numbers on them to safeguard against counterfeiting and voter impersonation. As stated in the Elections Department website:

ballot papers can be examined only under strict conditions, and there are safeguards that make it extremely difficult to find out how any particular voter voted. After the count, all ballot papers and their counterfoils have to be sealed in the Supreme Court vault for six months, after which all the ballot papers and other election documents are destroyed. During those six months, these documents can only be retrieved by court order. The court will issue such an order only if it is satisfied that a vote has been fraudulently cast and the result of the election may be affected as a result. Our courts have issued no such order since elections have been held here since 1948.

=== Other major political parties in Singapore ===
==== Workers' Party (WP) ====
The Workers' Party (WP) is the largest and oldest opposition party. The party achieved a significant milestone in 1981 when J.B. Jeyaretnam won the Anson by-election, becoming the first opposition Member of Parliament since 1965. In 2011, the party won Aljunied Group Representation Constituency (GRC), marking the first-ever opposition victory in a GRC. This was followed by another breakthrough in 2020 with the Sengkang GRC.

The WP claims to advocate for a balanced political landscape, offering constructive and responsible alternatives to the ruling party while championing the rights of Singaporeans.

==== Progress Singapore Party (PSP) ====
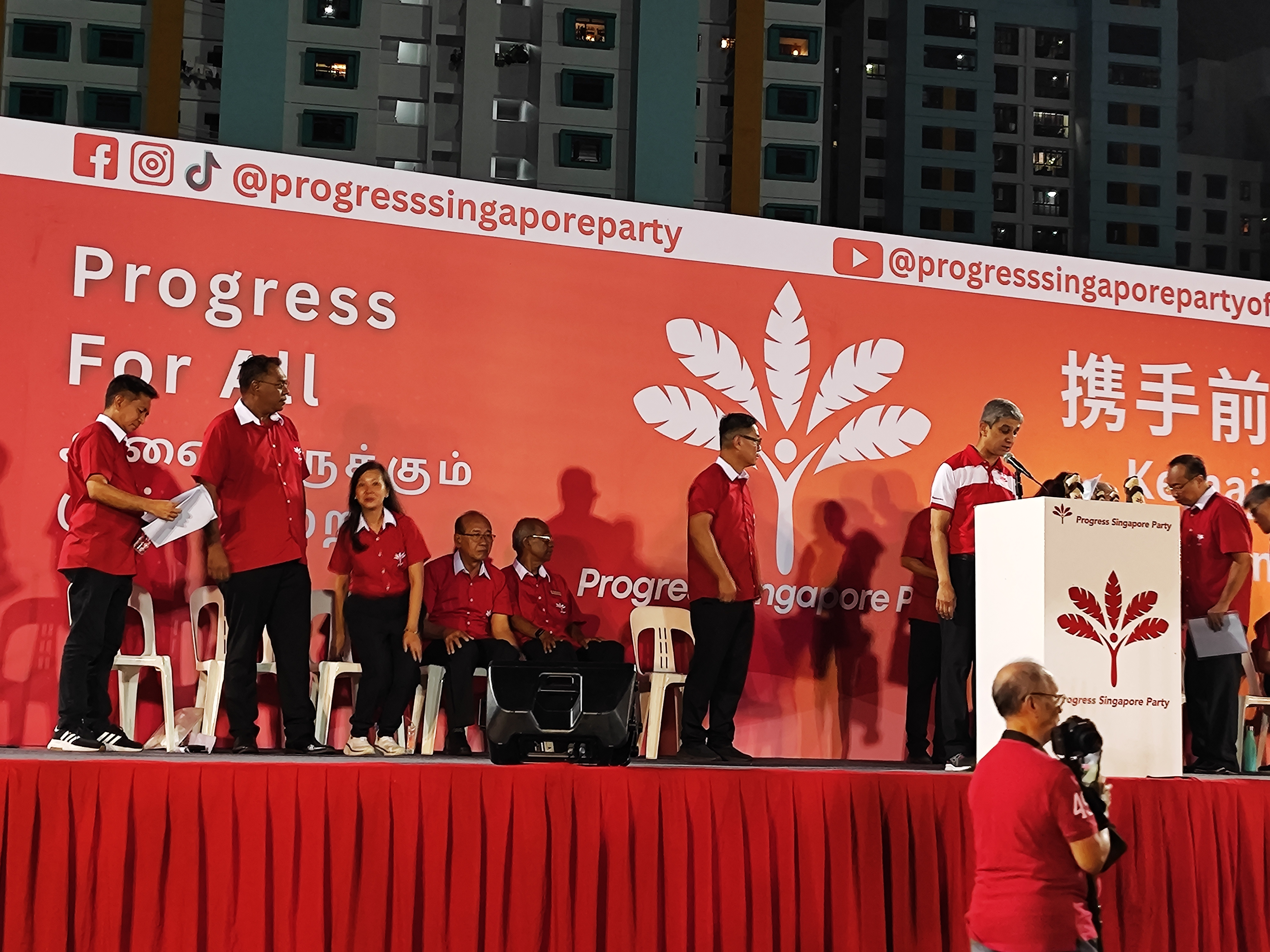
A Progress Singapore Party (PSP) rally in 2025

The Progress Singapore Party (PSP), founded on 28 March 2019 by former presidential candidate Tan Cheng Bock, is a major opposition party in Singapore. PSP contested its first General Election in 2020, fielding 24 candidates across nine constituencies. While the party did not win any seats, its West Coast GRC team achieved a close 48.31% vote share. This entitled the PSP to two non-constituency seats (NCMP) in the 14th Parliament, which was held by Hazel Poa and Leong Mun Wai.

==== Minor opposition parties ====
There are other opposition parties such as the Singapore People's Party (SPP), Reform Party (RP), the Singapore Democratic Party (SDP), and Red Dot United (RDU), among others, that do not hold a seat in parliament.

=== Shirt colours ===
The candidates and supporters of the various political parties tend to wear the following shirt colours while making their rounds in various wards or campaigning.

| Party | Shirt Colour |
|---|---|
| People's Action Party | White |
| Workers' Party | Light Blue |
| Progress Singapore Party | Red and White |
| Singapore People's Party | Red and White |
| Singapore Democratic Party | Red |
| National Solidarity Party | Orange |
| Reform Party | Yellow |
| Singapore Democratic Alliance | Bright Green |
| Democratic Progressive Party | White and Orange |
| People's Power Party | Light Purple |
| Peoples Voice | Purple and Black |
| Red Dot United | Navy Blue |

== See also ==
- Corruption in Singapore
- Dominant party system
- Constituencies of Singapore
- Human rights in Singapore
- Laws of Singapore
- Lists of members of parliament in Singapore
- Nepotism in Singapore politics
- Women in Singaporean politics
