= Faizah Jamal =

Singaporean politician

Faizah binte Haji Ahmad Jamal

Nominated Member of Parliament
- In office 2012–2014

Personal details
- Born: Singapore
- Party: Independent
- Education: National University of Singapore; King's College London
- Occupation: Adjunct Lecturer

Faizah binte Haji Ahmad Jamal is a Singaporean academic who served as a Nominated Member of Parliament from 2012 to 2014. She was educated at Raffles Girls' School, the National University of Singapore (Bachelor of Laws) and King's College London (Master's in Environment Law).
