= Jean See =

Singaporean politician

Jean See Jinli is a Singaporean who served as a Nominated Member of Parliament commencing 2023. She was the director of National Trades Union Congress (NTUC) Freelancers and Self-Employed (U FSE) Unit. She was awarded with the Public Service Medal (COVID-19).
