= Calvin Cheng =

Singaporean politician (born 1975)

- 郑恩里
- Cheng in 2026

Nominated Member of Parliament
- In office 18 July 2009 – 19 April 2011

Personal details
- Born: Calvin Cheng Ern Lee; 24 September 1975 (age 51) Singapore
- Education: Hertford College, Oxford
- Occupation: Businessman
- Website: calvincheng.sg

Calvin Cheng Ern Lee (born 24 September 1975) is a Singaporean businessman and former Nominated Member of Parliament. Cheng is known for his views on socio-political issues in Singapore. He began his business career in the modeling industry and expanded into event hosting, publishing, and educational technology.

== Education ==
Cheng earned his undergraduate degree in Philosophy, Politics and Economics at Hertford College, Oxford University. He later earned a master's degree in industrial relations. In 2017, he made a donation to Hertford to establish a prize for PPE students.

== Business career ==
Cheng was the Asia-Pacific head of Elite Model Management from 2001 to 2004. During his tenure, he opened an Elite agency in India while developing other projects in the region. In 2004, Cheng set up Elite Models Singapore Pte Ltd. The company was renamed Looque Models Singapore Pte Ltd in 2005. Through Looque he ran several franchising businesses in the fields of luxury events, media, and talent management in entertainment and business. Cheng ran Ford Models Supermodel of the World competitions under license from Ford in China in 2007 and in Malaysia in 2011. The World Economic Forum named Cheng a Young Global Leader in 2009.

On 23 November 2011, several model agencies, including Looque Models, were fined for price fixing. They fixed prices on modelling services through the Association of Modelling Industry Professionals (AMIP) from 2004, continuing after anti-competition laws were in effect. Cheng claimed in defense that the goal was to raise wages for models. The Competition Commission of Singapore (CCS) ruled that AMIP engaged in anti-competitive price-fixing that resulted in customers paying more, causing an adverse impact on the market. CCS noted that as president of AMIP, Cheng played a central role by instructing AMIP members how to mask the collusion to evade detection and complaints. Cheng's appeal of this ruling was dismissed because he had not been personally fined.

In August 2015, Cheng merged one of his franchise businesses, Lumina Looque Knowledge Hubs Pte Ltd, with a Chinese firm called ReTech that focused on educational technology, and led the company to IPO on the Australian Stock Exchange in June 2017. In June 2023, Retech Technology Co issued an announcement that Calvin Cheng had resigned his directorship in the company.

In May 2022, Dubai's Virtual Assets Regulatory Authority awarded a provisional virtual asset license to Cheng's company Web3 Holdings FZE, a non-fungible token (NFT) and fan token cryptocurrency investment company.

In February 2023, Cheng's digital asset management company, Damoon Technologies, which allowed fiat money to cashless cryptocurrency transactions and vice-versa, was officially given regulatory approval by FINMA, Switzerland’s financial services watchdog. In August 2023, Anchored Coins, formerly known as Damoon Technologies, issued two fiat-backed stablecoins AEUR and ACHF on two major public blockchains.

== Government roles ==
In July 2009, Cheng was appointed to a 2 1/2 year term as a Nominated Member of Parliament in Singapore's 11th Parliament. As NMPs are supposed to reflect nonpartisan views, the newspaper Today questioned his appointment in light of his membership in Young PAP. Cheng resigned from Young PAP shortly thereafter. His term as an NMP ended after 21 months when Parliament was dissolved during the general elections.

In 2012, Cheng was appointed to the newly formed Media Literacy Council (MLC) of Singapore's Ministry of Communications and Information, which was created to "promote civility and responsibility on the Internet". He served two two-year terms on the MLC.

In November 2022, the prime minister of Serbia appointed Cheng as the first honorary consul of Serbia to Singapore to establish closer ties with the country. Prior to his appointment, the ambassador in Jakarta would assist Serbian interests.

== Socio-political views ==
Cheng often posts his views on socio-political issues in Singapore on Facebook, and is known for attracting controversy at times for his outspoken views.

In November 2015, while he was on the Media Literacy Council, Cheng advocated for the killing of children of terrorists on the Facebook page of entrepreneur and commentator Devadas Krishnadas. His comments led to a verbal warning from Tan Cheng Han, the Chairman of the MLC. Cheng apologized to the MLC.

Amos Yee, a teenager who had been previously jailed for comments offensive to the Singaporean government, was convicted and jailed in 2016 for "hurting religious feelings" in his online responses to Cheng's Facebook posts. In March 2017, a United States judge granted Yee political asylum, citing the different ways that Cheng and Yee had been treated, where Cheng was not charged, and Yee was charged and convicted.

On 12 March 2025, Minister for Law and Home Affairs, K. Shanmugam was confronted by two women from Monday of Palestine Solidarity group at his Meet-The-People session to address Protection from Online Falsehoods and Manipulation Act. The confrontation was recorded on video and lasted seven minutes. On 13 March, Cheng, in a facebook post, offered to send the activist group to Gaza, provided they do not return to Singapore and also told their Facebook followers to leave Singapore for Gaza.

On 28 March, former Singapore Democratic Party chairman Jufrie Mahmood filed a police report against Cheng for being an Islamophobe describing his actions as a "danger to our precious racial and religious harmony". On 2 April, Cheng posted on Facebook that he will take legal action over defamatory statements made against him, including Jufrie who had filed a police report against him, Reform Party secretary-general Kenneth Jeyaretnam who asked for a probe against Cheng and sociopolitical platform The Online Citizen. After Mahmood hired lawyers to defend himself from Cheng's defamation lawsuit, he and Cheng decided to meet in person, after which Mahmood retracted his Facebook comments on August 12, saying he accepted that Cheng was "neither a racist nor an Islamophobe."

On 10 April, Cheng posted on Facebook again that he had met with Ustaz Mohamad Hasbi Hassan and Ustaz Pasuni Maulan at Yusof Ishak Mosque in Woodlands on 9 April. He said that he told them he did not intend any attack and had spoken to the Malay/Muslim community over the previous week and had realised he should be more sensitive and not said to send people to a conflict zone. Cheng also asserted that other had spoken untrue statements about him and he had to take legal actions. Prime Minister Lawrence Wong, during a visit to Madrasah Aljunied with Ustaz Hasbi and Ustaz Pasuni, said Cheng's remarks were "completely insensitive and unacceptable".
