= Party Whip of the People's Action Party =

Position within the People's Action Party of Singapore

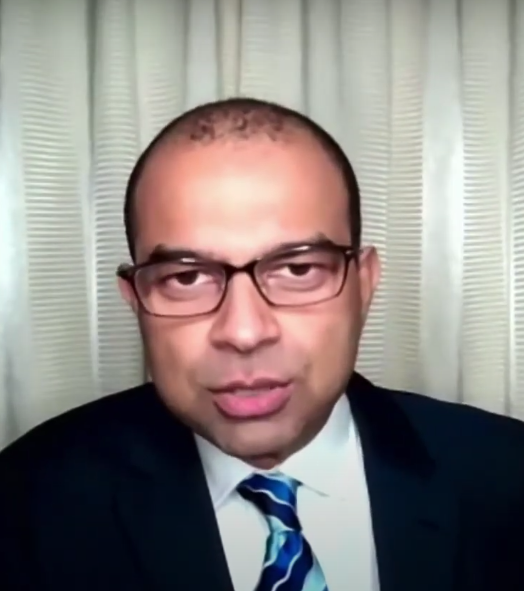
- Incumbent; Janil Puthucheary since 6 June 2019
- Appointer: Central Executive Committee
- Term length: No fixed term
- Inaugural holder: Lee Khoon Choy
- Formation: 23 June 1959; 67 years ago

The party whip of the People's Action Party is responsible for ensuring that the People's Action Party (PAP) Members of Parliament (MPs) attend and vote according to the party's line. The party whip also assists the Parliament in completing its business by listing the speaking MPs and the time required for each item of business. The incumbent party whip is Janil Puthucheary, who was appointed on 6 June 2019.

The party's Central Executive Committee (CEC) will appoint the party whip along with two deputy party whips.

== List of party whips ==
No.	Portrait	Name Constituency (Birth–Death)	Took office	Left office	Parliament
1		Lee Khoon Choy; MP for Bukit Panjang (1924–2016)	23 June 1959	16 October 1963	2nd Legislative Assembly
2		Chan Chee Seng; MP for Jalan Besar (1932–2022)	17 October 1963	15 April 1968	3rd Legislative Assembly
2		Chan Chee Seng; MP for Jalan Besar (1932–2022)	17 October 1963	15 April 1968	1st
3		Sia Kah Hui; MP for Upper Serangoon (1923–2009)	1 April 1968	30 April 1981	2nd
3		Sia Kah Hui; MP for Upper Serangoon (1923–2009)	1 April 1968	30 April 1981	3rd
3		Sia Kah Hui; MP for Upper Serangoon (1923–2009)	1 April 1968	30 April 1981	4th
3		Sia Kah Hui; MP for Upper Serangoon (1923–2009)	1 April 1968	30 April 1981	5th
4		Lee Yiok Seng; MP for Bukit Panjang (1939-2026)	1 May 1981	12 September 1988	5th
4		Lee Yiok Seng; MP for Bukit Panjang (1939-2026)	1 May 1981	12 September 1988	6th
5		Lee Boon Yang; MP for Jalan Besar GRC (born 1947)	13 September 1988	31 March 2007	7th
5		Lee Boon Yang; MP for Jalan Besar GRC (born 1947)	13 September 1988	31 March 2007	8th
5		Lee Boon Yang; MP for Jalan Besar GRC (born 1947)	13 September 1988	31 March 2007	9th
5		Lee Boon Yang; MP for Jalan Besar GRC (born 1947)	13 September 1988	31 March 2007	10th
5		Lee Boon Yang; MP for Jalan Besar GRC (born 1947)	13 September 1988	31 March 2007	11th
6		Lim Swee Say; MP for Holland–Bukit Timah GRC (until 2011) and East Coast GRC (from 2011) (born 1954)	1 April 2007	20 May 2011	11th
7		Gan Kim Yong; MP for Chua Chu Kang GRC (born 1959)	21 May 2011	27 September 2015	12th
8		Chan Chun Sing; MP for Tanjong Pagar GRC (born 1969)	28 September 2015	5 June 2019	13th
9		Janil Puthucheary; MP for Pasir Ris–Punggol GRC (until 2025) and Punggol GRC (from 2025) (born 1969)	6 June 2019	Incumbent	13th
9		Janil Puthucheary; MP for Pasir Ris–Punggol GRC (until 2025) and Punggol GRC (from 2025) (born 1969)	6 June 2019	Incumbent	14th
9		Janil Puthucheary; MP for Pasir Ris–Punggol GRC (until 2025) and Punggol GRC (from 2025) (born 1969)	6 June 2019	Incumbent	15th

== List of deputy party whips ==
No.	Portrait	Name Constituency (Birth–Death)	Took office	Left office	Parliament
1		Lee Hsien Loong; MP for Teck Ghee (born 1952)	2 January 1985	9 January 1987	6th
2		Eugene Yap; MP for Mountbatten	10 January 1987	12 September 1988	6th
3		Ho Kah Leong; MP for Jurong SMC (born 1937)	13 September 1988	24 January 1997	7th 8th
3		Ong Chit Chung; MP for Bukit Batok SMC (1949–2008)	30 April 1994	24 March 2002	8th 9th
4		Goh Chee Wee; MP for Boon Lay SMC (born 1947)	25 January 1997	24 March 2002	9th
5		Lim Swee Say; MP for Holland–Bukit Panjang GRC (born 1954)	25 March 2002	31 March 2007	10th
6		Inderjit Singh; MP for Ang Mo Kio GRC (born 1960)	25 March 2002	30 May 2011	10th 11th
7		Amy Khor; MP for Hong Kah GRC (born 1958)	1 April 2007	27 September 2015	11th 12th
8		Teo Ho Pin; MP for Bukit Panjang SMC (born 1960)	31 May 2011	27 September 2015	12th
9		Sam Tan; MP for Radin Mas SMC (born 1958)	28 September 2015	5 June 2019	13th
10		Zaqy Mohamad; MP for Chua Chu Kang GRC (born 1974)	6 June 2019	19 August 2020	14th
11		Sim Ann; MP for Holland–Bukit Timah GRC (born 1975)	6 June 2019	Incumbent	13th 14th 15th
