= Kanwaljit Soin =

Singaporean politician

Kanwaljit Soin is a consultant orthopaedic & hand surgeon at Mount Elizabeth Hospital, Singapore.

== Education ==
Soin studied in Tanjong Katong Girls' School for her secondary education and Victoria School for her pre-university education, and received her MBBS Hons in 1966 when she graduated top of her class. She obtained her Master of Medicine (Surgery) in 1970 from the University of Singapore, and she is a Fellow of the Royal Australasian College of Surgeons (1970) and the Academy of Medicine, Singapore (1975). Soin was the recipient of a Colombo Plan Scholarship to train in hand surgery in Australia in 1972.

== Biography ==
A founding member of Association of Women for Action and Research (AWARE) in 1985, Soin became the president of AWARE from 1991 to 1993.

Soin was AWARE President from 1991 to 1993, and became the first female Nominated Member of Parliament of Singapore from 1992 to 1996. In 1992, she was awarded "Woman of the Year" in Singapore.

In 2000 she was presented the “Women Who Make a Difference Award” by the International Women's Forum, Washington D.C.

In 2006, Soin was presented with the Lifetime Achievement Award by the United Nations Development Fund for Women (Unifem) Singapore for consistently excelling in her job and for her selfless contribution to society, especially towards the less advantaged.

In 2008, she was presented with the 2008 Singapore Good Samaritan award by the Rotary Club of Singapore, in recognition of her work as founding president of Women's Initiative for Ageing Successfully (WINGS), a non-profit centre to provide support for women in their 40s and above. WINGS has helped almost 12,000 women with various programmes.

In 2014, Soin was inducted to the Singapore Women's Hall of Fame.

== Personal life ==
Dr Soin is married to former judge, Amarjeet Singh. They have 3 sons, an Internet entrepreneur Dinesh Bhatia, Diplomat Umej Bhatia and Consultant Cardiologist Dr Lokpal Bhatia.

== Bibliography ==
- Soin, Kanwaljit (6 September 2017). Silver Shades of Grey. WSProfessional. doi:10.1142/10746. ISBN 978-981-323-133-7.
