= Viswa Sadasivan =

Singaporean politician

Viswaroopan ("Viswa") Sadasivan (born 1959 in Singapore) was a Nominated Member of Parliament (NMP) in the Parliament of Singapore from 2009 to 2011.

== Biography ==
Viswa had his secondary school education at Raffles Institution, before going on to do a degree in political science at the National University of Singapore. After graduating, he worked for the Singapore Broadcasting Corporation (SBC, later renamed MediaCorp), where he was the presenter and producer of a number of current affairs television programmes including Feedback, Talking Point and Today in Parliament, before becoming the Senior Controller of the Current Affairs Division. He received an SBC scholarship to study at Harvard University's John F. Kennedy School of Government, where he completed a Master of Public Administration degree. He subsequently worked as senior manager for corporate planning and business development at Singapore Press Holdings, before joining the Canadian television company UTV International as its chief executive officer (CEO).

In 1997, Viswa co-founded the Right Angle Group (subsequently renamed Strategic Moves Pte Ltd), a television production, communications training and strategic consultancy organisation based in Singapore. He is currently the organisation's CEO. He received a 'Spirit of Enterprise Award' in 2003 in recognition of his entrepreneurial achievements.

Viswa has been extensively involved in public service. He has served as the Chairman of the Political Development Feedback Group of Singapore's Feedback Unit, and as Vice-President and Secretary of the Singapore Indian Development Association (SINDA) Executive Committee. He has also served on the Media Development Authority's Board, the Singapore 21 Committee, Economic Review Committee, Remaking Singapore Committee, and the National Youth Achievement Award Council.

=== Nominated Member of Parliament ===
Viswa was appointed as a Nominated Member of Parliament in July 2009. The following month, he used his maiden speech in Parliament to table a motion calling for the House to reaffirm its commitment to the principles enshrined in the Singapore National Pledge (which refers to Singaporeans as "one united people, regardless of race, language or religion"), and questioned whether the government was sending out mixed signals by emphasising racial categorisations, for example by promoting ethnic-based self-help groups. His speech attracted considerable media attention and drew responses from a number of Members of Parliament from Singapore's governing People's Action Party (PAP), including Minister Mentor, Lee Kuan Yew. Lee stated that he wanted to "bring the House back to earth" on the issue of racial equality in Singapore, and rebut Viswa's "false and flawed" arguments. He stated that the National Pledge was an not an "ideology" but an "aspiration", which may take "decades, if not centuries" to be realised. It was the first time since 2007 that Lee had chosen to speak during a debate in Parliament. In the end, Viwsa's motion was adopted by the House with two amendments – one from Lee highlighting the principles of the Pledge as aspirations, and one from PAP MP Zainudin Nordin noting Singapore's progress towards nation building.

=== Sexual harassment allegations ===
On 4 February 2021, Singaporean comedian Sharul Channa shared on Facebook that an "inappropriate and offensive" innuendo was made during an interview for an online series Inconvenient Questions by Viswa, who was the interviewer. Viswa apologised on the same day after Sharul had reached out to his producer about the sexual innuendo after the show. Thereafter, doctoral researcher Kiran Kandade shared screenshots of WhatsApp conversation between her and Viswa in 2016, of which he had asked her for a kiss. Despite Kandade trying to steer the conversation back to work related matters, Viswa persisted.

On 20 February 2021, the Association of Women for Action and Research (AWARE) commented that Sharul had experienced what is a workplace sexual harassment. On the same day, National University of Singapore reported that it had terminated all projects with Viswa, as a result of the allegations made. Viswa gave his apologies to the two women involved.
