= Paulin Tay Straughan =

Singaporean politician

- Occupations: Dean of Students, Professor of Sociology (Practice)
- Title: Professor

Academic background
- Education: University of Virginia, National University of Singapore

Academic work
- Discipline: Sociology
- Sub-discipline: Sociology of the family, Medical Sociology, Sociology of ageing
- Institutions: Singapore Management University

Paulin Tay Straughan (born 8 April 1963) is the dean of students at Singapore Management University (SMU), where she is also a professor of sociology (practice).

She was an associate professor and vice-dean at the National University of Singapore from 1991 to 2017.

== Early life and education ==
Straughan was educated at the Convent of the Holy Infant Jesus and Catholic Junior College, before going on to complete a Bachelor of Arts degree in sociology and statistics at the National University of Singapore. She then went on to the University of Virginia in the United States, where she earned a Master of Arts and a PhD in sociology.

== Public service ==
From 2009 to 2012, Straughan served as a Nominated Member of Parliament (NMP). She received the Public Administration Medal (Bronze), Prime Minister's Office in 2010. On 24 August 2018, Straughan was appointed as one of the 86 Justice of Peace by President of Singapore, Halimah Yacob.

== Research ==
Straughan has researched on cancer and fatalism, marriage, parenthood and ageing population, and public cleanliness in Singapore.

== Selected bibliography ==
=== Books ===
- Jones, Gavin W.; Straughan, Paulin Tay; and Chan, Angelique Wei Ming (2012). Ultra-low fertility in Pacific Asia: Trends, causes and policy issues. Research Collection School of Social Sciences. Paper 2194. ISBN 9780415540780
- Straughan, Paulin Tay (2011). Towards a cleaner Singapore: Sociological study on littering in Singapore. National Environment Agency. ISBN 978-981-08-9598-3
- Straughan, Paulin Tay (2009). Marriage dissolution in Singapore: Revisiting family values and ideology in marriage. Leiden: Brill. ISBN 9789004171619

=== Book chapters ===
- Straughan, Paulin Tay (2015). Marriage and parenthood in Singapore. In David Chan (Ed.), 50 Years of Social Issues in Singapore (pp. 61–73) Singapore: World Scientific Publishing Company. http://doi.org/10.1142/9789814632621_0004

=== Articles ===
- Feng, Qiushi; Straughan, Paulin Tay (2017). "What does successful aging mean? Lay perception of successful aging among elderly Singaporeans." Journals of Gerontology, Series B, 72 (2), 204-213. http://doi.org/10.1093/geronb/gbw151
- Straughan, Paulin Tay; Seow, Adeline (2000). "Attitudes as barriers in breast screening: a prospective study among Singapore women." Social Science and Medicine, 51 (11), 1695-1703. https://doi.org/10.1016/S0277-9536(00)00086-1
- Straughan, Paulin Tay; Seow, Adeline (1998). "Fatalism reconceptualized: A concept to predict health screening behavior." Journal of Gender, Culture, and Health, 3 (2), 85-100. https://doi.org/10.1023/A:1023278230797
