= Ong Soh Khim =

Singaporean politician

Ong Soh Khim (Note: Chinese: 王素琴; Pe̍h-ōe-jī: Ông Sò͘-khîm; pinyin: Wáng Sùqín) was a Nominated Member of Parliament (NMP) in Singapore from January 2005 to April 2006. She was appointed by Singaporean President S. R. Nathan in December 2004.

== Background ==
Born and raised in a working-class family in Singapore, Ong studied at Beatty Primary School, Ang Mo Kio Primary School and Ang Mo Kio Secondary School, and did her A levels at National Junior College from 1987 to 1988.

After enrolling at the National University of Singapore (NUS), Ong received her B.Eng. (Honours in Mechanical Engineering) in 1992. She was awarded her Ph.D. from NUS. She is currently an associate professor at the NUS Department of Mechanical Engineering. She was a member of the NUS Senate Delegacy until June 2013. Her field of study is manufacturing processes and technologies in the department's Manufacturing Division. She specializes in virtual manufacturing, augmented reality application in manufacturing and design.

== Notable awards and recognition ==
- IJPR Norman Dudley Award, September 2003.

== Nominated Member of Parliament ==
Ong was appointed as a Nominated Member of Parliament (10th Parliament, Second Session) by the president of Singapore in December 2004. She has participated actively and has been vocal in issues such as corporatisation of public universities in Singapore, fee hikes in university education, casino debate, women's rights among others.
