= Ivan Png =

Singaporean economist

- 方博亮
- Born: 1957 (age 68–69)
- Education: BA Hons Cambridge, 1978; PhD Stanford, 1985
- Occupation: Economist
- Known for: Describing the Golden Mile Complex as a "vertical slum"; Advocating laws to regulate trans-national emissions

Ivan Png Paak Liang (Note: Chinese: 方博亮; Pe̍h-ūe-jī: Png Phak-liãng; pinyin: Fāng Bóliàng) is a Singaporean economist and academic. He is a Distinguished Professor in the School of Business and Department of Economics at the National University of Singapore.

Png was previously a faculty member at the UCLA Anderson School of Management from 1985 to 1996, and the Hong Kong University of Science and Technology from 1993 to 1996.

== Education ==
Png attended the Anglo-Chinese School, Singapore, receiving the Tan Chin Tuan Medal for performance in the GCE Advanced Level Examination. The Government of Singapore awarded him a President's Scholarship. In 1975, he matriculated into Gonville and Caius College, Cambridge and he graduated with a BA (First Class Honours) in economics in 1978. In 1980, was admitted to the Graduate School of Business, Stanford University, and received the PhD in 1985.

== Scholarship ==
Png is the author of Managerial Economics, which has been translated into Chinese (both traditional characters and simplified characters) and Korean. Managerial Economics is written, "in simple, accessible style, the text-book presents the essentials of managerial economics." The book has been revised five times, with the sixth English edition published by Routledge.

In the early part of his career, Png's carried out applied theoretical research, studying the economics of litigation and enforcement, and showing several notable results with Dilip Mookherjee. In mid-career, he switched to empirical methods. Recent research has focused on the economics of innovation, and the economics of productivity, for which he received funding from the Social Sciences Research Council.

== University management ==
In 2000, Png was appointed the Dean of the School of Computing at the National University of Singapore. In the following year, the National University of Singapore re-organized management along U.S. lines, with the Chief Academic Officer taking the title of Provost. Png was the first incumbent in the post of Vice Provost for Graduate and Undergraduate Education. As Vice Provost, he oversaw the development of a university-wide course bidding system to resolve persistent complaints about access to high-demand courses, brought back semester examinations from off-campus sites to campus, and brought forward the university graduation ceremonies from September to July.

== Policy ==
Png was a nominated MP (10th Parliament of Singapore) from 2005 to 2006. His first parliamentary question asked the Minister for Education to report examination results by family income and not race. In October 2005, Png unsuccessfully moved an amendment to the Income Tax Act to reduce record-keeping to five years from seven years. Subsequently, the government passed an omnibus bill to reduce record keeping across multiple laws to five years. In November 2005, he queried whether the revenue pool between Singapore Airlines and Malaysian Airlines on the Kuala Lumpur - Singapore air route restricted competition. During the 2006 budget debate, he described the Golden Mile Shopping Centre as a "vertical slum and a national disgrace".

In a series of opinion articles in the Singapore and Malaysian media, he advocated that environmental laws be extended to outlaw trans-boundary emissions.

== Other activities ==
Png was a Reserve Officer in the Singapore Armed Forces, Third Division, leaving the service with the rank of captain. Png testified on economic damages in the representative action by members of the Raffles Town Club against the club for breach of contract.
