= Geh Min =

Singaporean politician

- 倪敏
- Born: 1950 (age 75–76)
- Education: National University of Singapore
- Known for: Nature Society (former President)

Geh Min (Note: Chinese: 倪敏; pinyin: Ní Mǐn) is a former President of Nature Society in Singapore. She served as a Nominated Member of Parliament from January 2005 to April 2006.

== Early life and education ==
Geh studied at Methodist Girls' School and Anglo-Chinese School. She is a medicine graduate of the National University of Singapore.

== Career ==
Geh is a consultant ophthalmologist at Mount Elizabeth Medical Centre, and also a visiting consultant at the Singapore National Eye Centre and the National University Hospital.

In December 2004, Geh was appointed as a Nominated Member of Parliament.

In 2006, Geh was one of the three recipients of the inaugural President's Award for the Environment, along with Tommy Koh and the Waterways Watch Society (WWS).

Geh heads the Environment and Health Functional Committee of the South-West Community Development Council. She is a board member of the Nature Conservancy's Asia Pacific Council; the Water Network of the PUB; and the Singapore Environment Council.

== Personal life ==
Geh is the granddaughter of philanthropist Lee Kong Chian.
