= Kuah Boon Theng =

Singaporean medical lawyer

Kuah Boon Theng is a Singaporean medical lawyer who has been a senior counsel of Singapore since 2018 and a Nominated Member of Parliament (NMP) since 2026.

== Early life and education ==
Kuah studied in National University of Singapore, and obtained a master's degree in medical ethics and law from King's College University of London in 1993.

== Career ==
Kuah started in Khattar Wong & Partners as a trainee in 1990 when recently corporatised public hospitals were looking for lawyers. She was admitted to the bar in March 1991, and specialised in healthcare law. In 1998, she was made partner in the firm but left the firm due to her colleagues requesting for similar flexible working arrangement she was given to raise her children.

On 1 April 2003, Kuah and her former colleague Simon Yuen formed the Legal Clinic LLC, a law corporation after the previous law partnership where they were at, Tan & Lim, was dissolved. Beyond resolving medical-legal disputes, Legal Clinic also analyses related complaints and suggest changes to workflows and processes to prevent a replay of similar issues.

In November 2015, after an election, Kuah was appointed as a vice president for Law Society of Singapore.

On 8 January 2018, Kuah was appointed as a senior counsel of Singapore.

In March 2019, Kuah was appointed as a co-chair to a 12-member workgroup to review the taking of informed consent by doctors and the disciplinary processes of the Singapore Medical Council (SMC). Prior to the formation of the workgroup, there were a series of legal cases involving informed consent of patients during their medical care with the resultant disciplinary actions that were contrary to common practices in administering medication. The workgroup made 23 recommendations to reform the disciplinary processes and three recommendations on taking informed consents by doctors. Some recommendations related to disciplinary processes were adopted by the SMC, and the ones related to the legal test on informed consent were also incorporated into the Civil Law Act as section 37 in 2020.

In 2026, Kuah was selected to be a Nominated Member of Parliament of Singapore.

== Personal life ==
Kuah has three children, one daughter and two sons.

== Bibliography ==
- Yeo, Khee Quan, ed. (2004). Essentials of medical law. Singapore : [St. Paul], Minn: Sweet & Maxwell Asia ; West Group. ISBN 978-981-05-0326-0. (co-author)
