= Ngiam Tee Liang =

Singaporean politician

Ngiam Tee Liang (Note: Chinese: 严世良; Bǽh-oe-tu: Ngiâm Tì-liâng; pinyin: Yán Shìliáng) is the former Head of the Department of Social Work, Faculty of Arts and Social Sciences, National University of Singapore and was a Nominated Member of Parliament (NMP) in Singapore from 2002 to 2005.

== Early life and education ==
Ngiam was fostered out when he was one week old until he was 12 years old. It made him wonder about the welfare of youths in the community, and got him started on Social Work. He was educated in Victoria School and University of Singapore.

== Career ==
Ngiam was one of the pioneers of the social work movement in Singapore, with 40 years of work as a social work educator and community service volunteer. Through the years, Ngiam has been championing social justice through his involvement in numerous projects and panels in prison rehabilitation, youth policy, and family life education.

In 2002, Ngiam was nominated and appointed to be a NMP.

== Personal life ==
Ngiam is married to Lim Geak Kim. They have two children.

== Bibliography ==
- "Population ageing in Singapore: The challenge of using the Central Provident Fund for retirement needs," Ageing Matters: European Policy Lessons from the East. Eds. J Doling, C Jones Finer and T Maltby. Adlershot: Ashgate, 2005.
- "Contemporary welfare policy and social well-being," Social Work in Context: A Reader. Eds. KK Mehta and A Wee. Singapore: Marshall Cavendish International, 2004.
- "Inclusion of people with disabilities: Policies and Services," Extending Frontiers: Social Issues and Social Work in Singapore. Eds. N T Tan and K K Mehta. Singapore: Times Media Private Ltd and Eastern Universities Press, 2002. (In commemoration of 50th anniversary of social work education in Singapore)
- (with Vasoo, S and P P L Cheung), "Singapore's ageing population: Some emerging trends and issues," Ageing in Asia-Pacific Region. Ed. D R Phillips. London: Routledge, 2000.
- (with Low, L), "An underclass among the overclass," Singapore: Towards a Developed Status. Ed. L Low. Singapore: Oxford University Press, 1999.
