= Wee Siew Kim =

Singaporean politician

Member of the Singapore Parliament for Ang Mo Kio GRC
- In office 25 October 2001 – 27 September 2010
- Preceded by: PAP held
- Succeeded by: PAP held
- Majority: 2001: N/A (walkover); 2006: 47,157 (32.28$)

Personal details
- Born: Wee Siew Kim; 19 April 1960 Colony of Singapore
- Party: People's Action Party

Wee Siew Kim (Note: Chinese: 黃守金; Pe̍h-ōe-jī: Ûiⁿ Siú-kim; pinyin: Huáng Shǒujīn) (born 19 August 1960) is a Singaporean former politician and businessman. A member of the People's Action Party, he was a Member of the Parliament of Singapore representing the Ang Mo Kio Group Representation Constituency from 25 October 2001 to 19 April 2011.

== Early life and education ==
Wee was born on 19 August 1960, and was educated at Raffles Institution, followed by the Imperial College of Science and Technology in London Bachelor of Science (Aeronautical Engineering) (Hons), followed by an MBA at Stanford University.

== Career ==
From 1984 to 2001, he worked at Singapore Technologies Aerospace, becoming President of Singapore Technologies Aerospace.

From 2001 to 2002, he was President of ST Engineering – Europe

From 2002 to 2004, he was President, Defence Business, ST Engineering.

From 2004 to 2009, he was Deputy CEO & President, Defence Business, ST Engineering

He is Group Chief Executive Officer of Nipsea Group and Deputy President Nippon Paint Holdings since 2009. He was previously the deputy CEO (Aerospace and Marine) and concurrent president, Defence Business of Singapore Technologies Engineering Ltd.

On 1 October 2020, he joined Jurong Port as Deputy Board Chairman and was appointed as Chairman and Chairman of the Executive Committee on 1 October 2021.

Wee is a Fellow of the City and Guilds Institute. He also serves on the Boards of Mapletree Logistics Trust Management, SIA Engineering Company and Singapore Telecommunications. He is also a member of the board of directors (non-executive & independent) of SBS Transit, and Director of Changi Airports International Pte Ltd.

== Personal life ==
Wee is a Buddhist. Wee is married and has four children.

In October 2006, one of Wee's daughters, Wee Shu Min, was in the news for posting on her blog what is viewed by some Singaporeans to be elitist, naive and insensitive statements against heartlanders.

== Notes ==
Parliament of Singapore
Preceded by Tang Guan Seng; Inderjit Singh; Tan Boon Wan; Lee Hsien Loong; Seng Han Thong	Member of Parliament for Ang Mo Kio GRC; 2015–present Served alongside: (2001 - 2006): Balaji Sadasivan, Inderjit Singh, Tan Boon Wan, Lee Hsien Loong, Seng Han Thong (2006 - 2011): Balaji Sadasivan, Inderjit Singh, Lee Bee Wah, Lam Pin Min, Lee Hsien Loong	Succeeded by Yeo Guat Kwang; Ang Hin Kee; Inderjit Singh; Intan Azura Mokhtar; Lee Hsien Loong; Seng Han Thong
