= Next Singaporean general election =

- By 5 December 2030

All 97 directly elected seats in Parliament (and up to 12 NCMPs) 49 seats needed for a majority
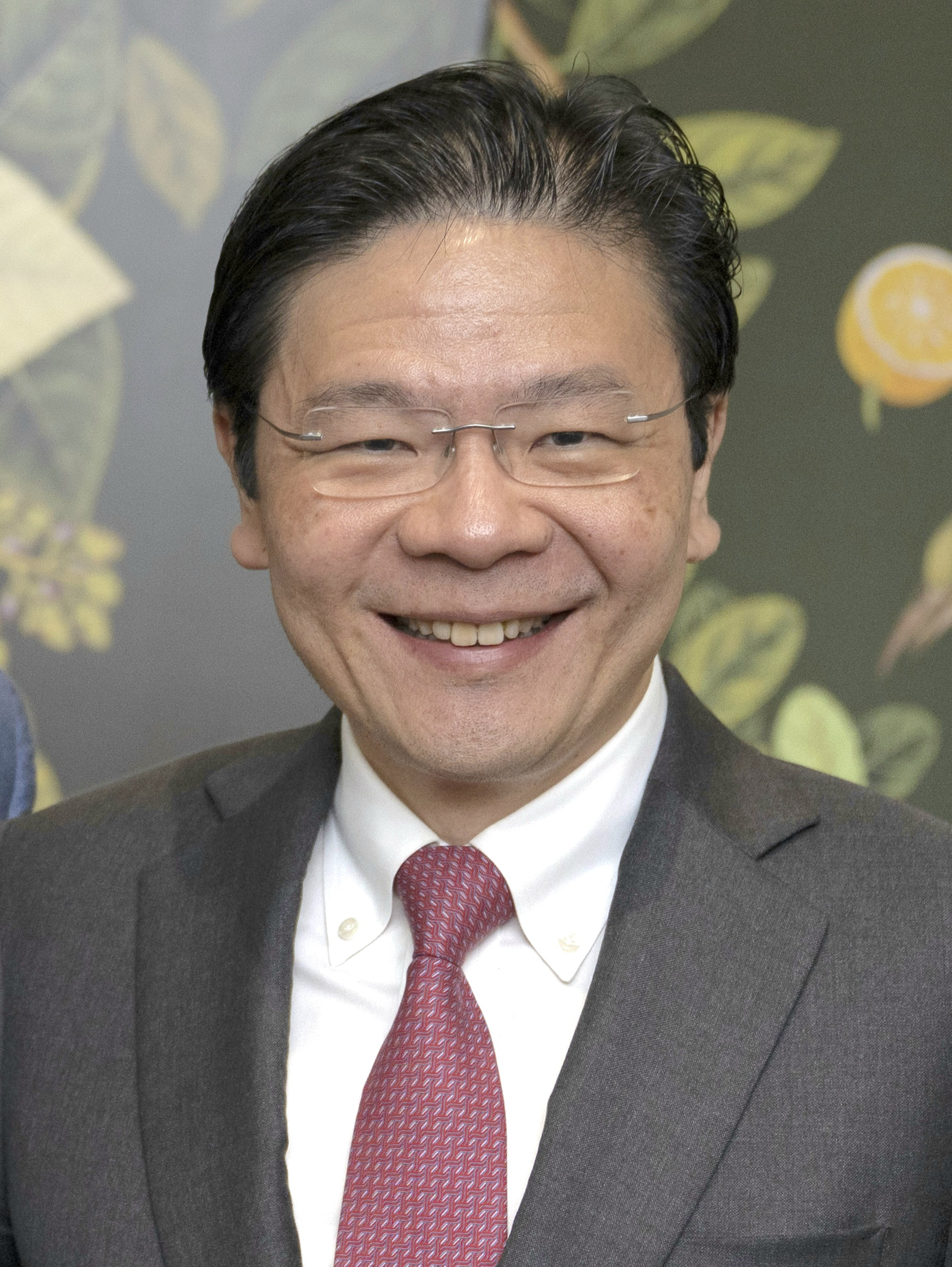

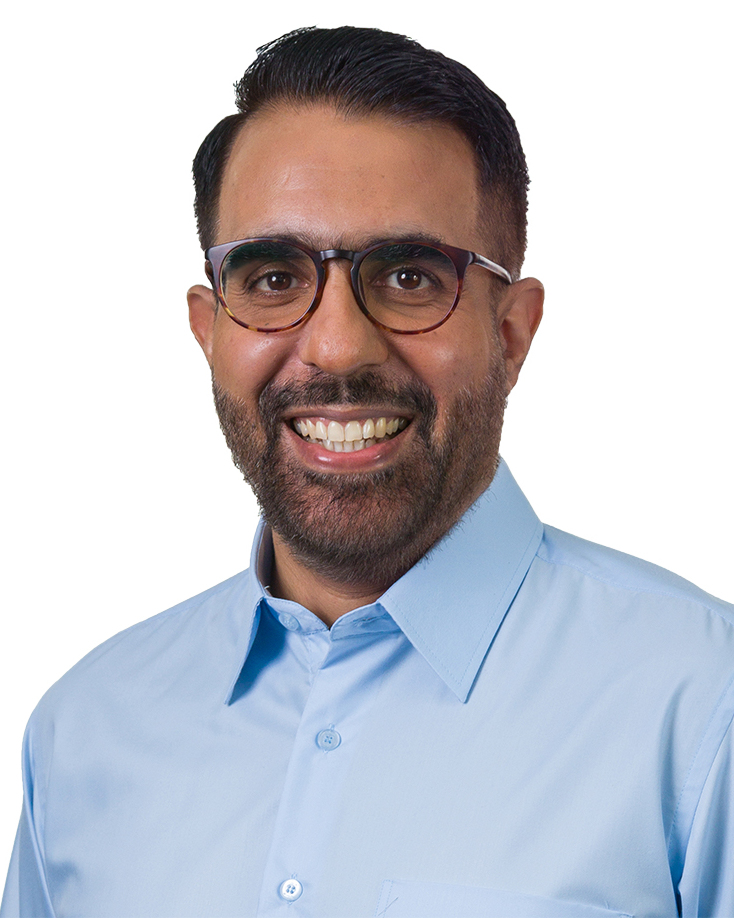
	First party	Second party
Leader	Lawrence Wong	Pritam Singh
Party	PAP	WP
Leader's seat	Marsiling–Yew Tee GRC	Aljunied GRC
Last election	65.57%, 87 seats	14.99%, 12 seats
Seats before	86	12
Prime Minister before election
Lawrence Wong
PAP
Elected Prime Minister
TBD

General elections are scheduled to be held in Singapore by 5 December 2030 to elect members of Parliament. They will be the seventeenth general elections since the introduction of self-government in 1959 and the fifteenth since independence in 1965, and will elect the 16th Parliament of Singapore.

== Background ==
The previous general election in 2025 saw an increase in the share of the nationwide popular vote for both the governing People's Action Party (PAP) and the opposition Workers' Party (WP), allowing the former to retain its supermajority held since independence. The WP retained all ten seats (Note: Comprising Hougang Single Member Constituency (SMC) and the two GRCs of Aljunied (5 seats) and Sengkang (4 seats).) which it won in 2020 and gained two seats for non-constituency Members of Parliament (NCMPs), bringing its total representation in Parliament to twelve seats, the most ever held by a single opposition party. On the other hand, most opposition parties suffered a drop in support, with the Progress Singapore Party (PSP) losing both NCMP seats it had gained in 2020. Voter turnout in 2025 was 92.47%, the lowest since 1968. The PAP won the five seats of Marine Parade–Braddell Heights Group Representation Constituency (GRC) in the first walkover since 2011.

=== Removal of Pritam Singh as Leader of the Opposition ===
On 14 January 2026, in the first few months of the 15th Parliament, Leader of the House Indranee Rajah moved a motion to declare WP secretary-general Pritam Singh "unsuitable" as Leader of the Opposition. The motion came in the wake of Singh's conviction on two counts of providing a false testimony to the Committee of Privileges in 2025 in relation to the 2021 resignation of MP Raeesah Khan. The vote was split along party lines; all PAP and nominated MPs (NMPs) in attendance voted in favour, while all WP MPs, other than absent NCMP Eileen Chong, voted against the motion despite the party whip being lifted. During the debate, Indranee said that Parliament could not remove Singh by itself and that the authority to appoint or remove the leader of the opposition rested with the Prime Minister.

The following day, Prime Minister Lawrence Wong removed Singh as leader of the opposition, inviting the WP to nominate another of its elected MPs as a replacement. After deliberation, the WP rejected the offer through its website on 21 January, claiming that the leader of the largest opposition party in Parliament was themselves the leader of the opposition. In response, the Prime Minister's Office (PMO) announced on the same day that it had accepted the rejection and that the position would remain vacant until the party was "ready to nominate someone to take on the responsibility".

On 30 April, the party issued Singh a letter of reprimand, citing that he had violated Articles 20(1) and 30 of the party constitution. On 28 June, a special cadre meeting was held to decide whether Singh would retain his post as Secretary-General; four-fifths of the cadres voted for support, including predecessor Low Thia Khiang, allowing Singh to retain his leadership post. Later when the next Parliament session convened on 7 July, Indranee decided not to take further action against both Sylvia Lim and Faisal Manap, citing that the case had lapsed onto the next parliamentary term and could not be punished retroactively under the Parliament (Privileges, Immunity and Powers) Act 1962.

=== Other extraparliamentary parties ===
On 7 July 2025, the Reform Party (RP) announced their departure from the People's Alliance for Reform (PAR), leaving the alliance with only Peoples Voice (PV) and Democratic Progressive Party (DPP) as membership parties. On 18 July 2026, RP secretary-general Kenneth Jeyaretnam died, leaving RP's fate uncertain.

On 6 July 2026, secretary-general Goh Meng Seng and chairman Derrick Sim stood down from the respective roles within the People's Power Party (PPP) in its leadership renewal. William Lim took over as secretary-general, with no announcement of a successor for the chair. On that same day, Stephanie Tan of the Progress Singapore Party (PSP) resigned; PSP leader Leong Mun Wai continued to assume his duties and pledged to improve the party's performance in the next election.

== Electoral system ==
According to Article 65(4) of the Constitution, the maximum term of any given Parliament is five years from the date of its first sitting following the previous general election, after which it is dissolved automatically. However, the Prime Minister may advise the President to dissolve Parliament earlier should a vote of confidence pass with the support of a majority of sitting MPs. A general election must be held within three months after Parliament is dissolved.

=== Political parties ===
The table below lists political parties elected or nominated in Parliament after the 2025 general election:

Name	Leader	Ideology	Votes (%)	Seats			Status
Name	Leader	Ideology	Votes (%)	Last election	Non-constituency	Current seats	Status
People's Action Party (PAP)	Lawrence Wong	Conservatism; Civic nationalism	65.57%	87 / 97	Government	86 / 99	Governing party
Workers' Party (WP)	Pritam Singh	Social democracy Parliamentarism	14.99%	10 / 97	2 / 2	12 / 99	Opposition
Vacant	—N/a					1 / 99	—N/a

=== List of vacated seats ===
The 15th Parliament has one vacant seat: (Note: A by-election is only called in Singapore if the MP for an SMC, or all elected MPs for a group representation constituency (GRC), resign from Parliament.)

Affiliation	Member	Constituency	Date of resignation	Reason	Ref.
PAP	Muhammad Faishal Ibrahim	Marine Parade–Braddell Heights GRC	20 July 2026	Interactions with a woman that "'fell short' of standards required of a political office holder and Member of Parliament"	
