= Eileen Chong =

Singaporean politician (born 1992)

The Honourable Eileen Chong
- 蒋佩姗
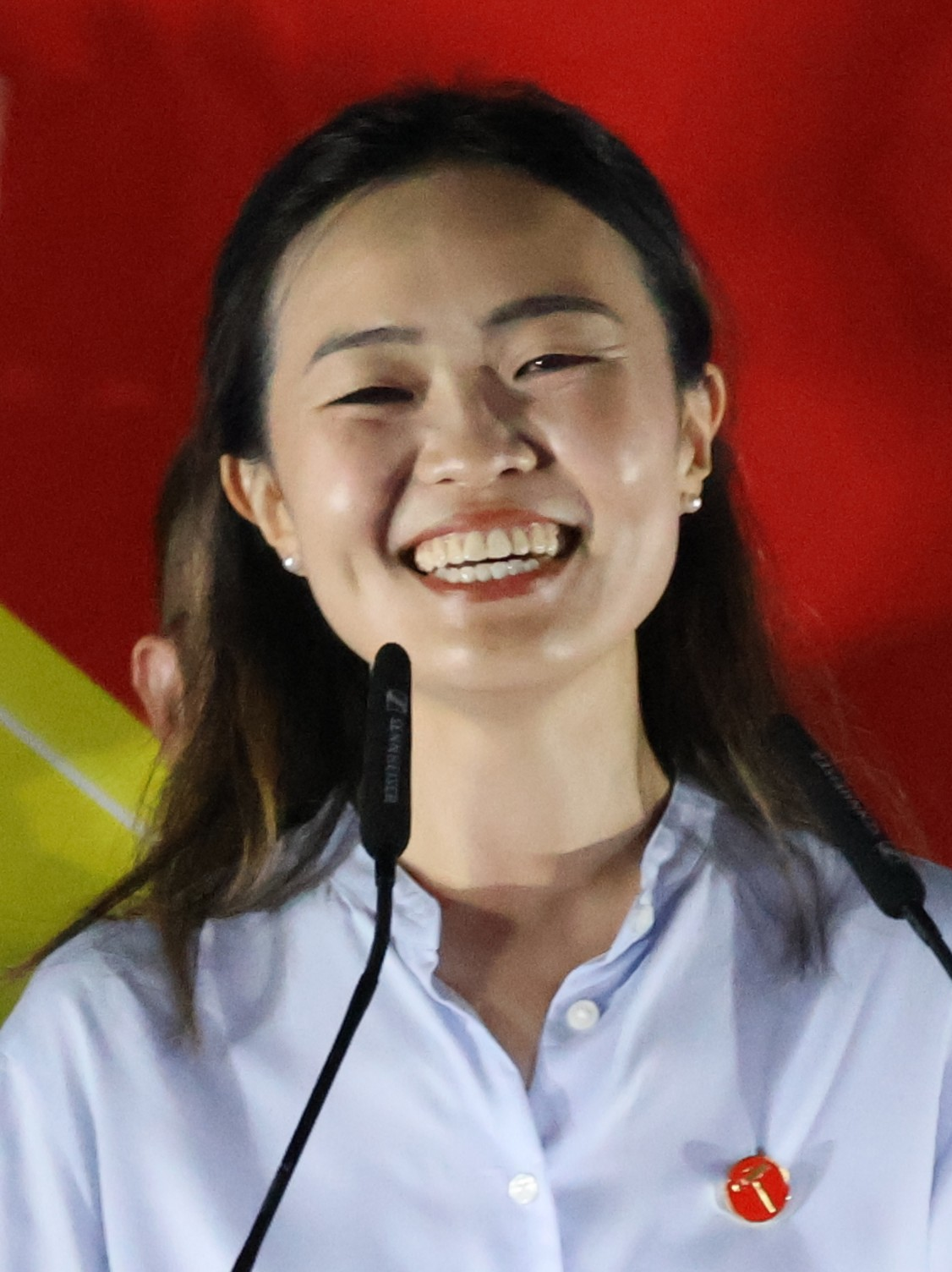
- Chong in 2025

Non-Constituency Member of the 15th Parliament of Singapore
- Incumbent
- Assumed office 19 May 2025 Serving with Andre Low
- Preceded by: Leong Mun Wai; Hazel Poa

President of the Youth Wing of the Workers' Party
- Incumbent
- Assumed office 18 June 2025
- Preceded by: Jamus Lim

Personal details
- Born: Eileen Chong Pei Shan; 29 April 1992 (age 34) Singapore
- Party: Workers' Party
- Education: Peking University (BA); Yonsei University (MA)
- Occupation: Politician; former diplomat

Eileen Chong Pei Shan (Note: Chinese: 蒋佩姗; pinyin: Jiǎng Pèishān) (born 29 April 1992) is a Singaporean politician and former diplomat. A member of the opposition Workers' Party (WP), she has been serving as a Non-Constituency Member of Parliament (NCMP) since 19 May 2025.

== Early life and education ==
Growing up in Tampines before moving to Jurong West, Chong attended Xingnan Primary School, Jurong Secondary School and later graduated from Anglo-Chinese School (Independent) with an International Baccalaureate diploma in 2010.

In 2011, Chong was awarded the Singapore Government Scholarship (Foreign Service). She subsequently studied in Peking University in Beijing, earning a Bachelor of Arts in International Politics. She also holds a Master of Arts in Global Affairs and Policy from Yonsei University in Seoul.

== Career ==
From 2017 to 2024, Chong worked at the Singapore Ministry of Foreign Affairs. She subsequently joined the Asia Philanthropy Circle (APC) in June 2024, working in the social impact sector.

=== Political career ===
Chong joined the Workers' Party (WP) in the second-half of 2024. She served as a volunteer caseworker at Meet-the-People Sessions in Aljunied GRC alongside Member of Parliament (MP) Gerald Giam.

On 17 April 2025, Chong was unveiled as part of a new group of candidates contesting in the 2025 Singaporean general election. During nomination day, she was fielded in the Tampines GRC with incumbent MP Faisal Manap, Michael Thng, Ong Lue Ping and Jimmy Tan against the People's Action Party (PAP), People's Power Party (PPP) and National Solidarity Party (NSP).

On Polling Day, the WP narrowly lost the GRC, winning 47.37% of the total votes. This was the second smallest victory margin for the PAP, allowing WP candidates in Tampines GRC to be eligible for a Non-constituency Member of Parliament (NCMP).

On 19 May 2025, WP announced that Chong would become a NCMP alongside Jalan Kayu SMC candidate Andre Low. In June 2025, Chong was co-opted to the Central Executive Committee along with fellow NCMP Andre Low, Abdul Muhaimin and Kenneth Tiong. Chong was appointed as Youth Wing President replacing Jamus Lim.

== Notes ==
Parliament of Singapore
Preceded by Leong Mun Wai; Hazel Poa	Non-Constituency Member of Parliament; 2025–present Served alongside: Andre Low	Incumbent
