= Dennis Tan =

Singaporean politician and lawyer

The Honourable Dennis Tan
- 陈立峰
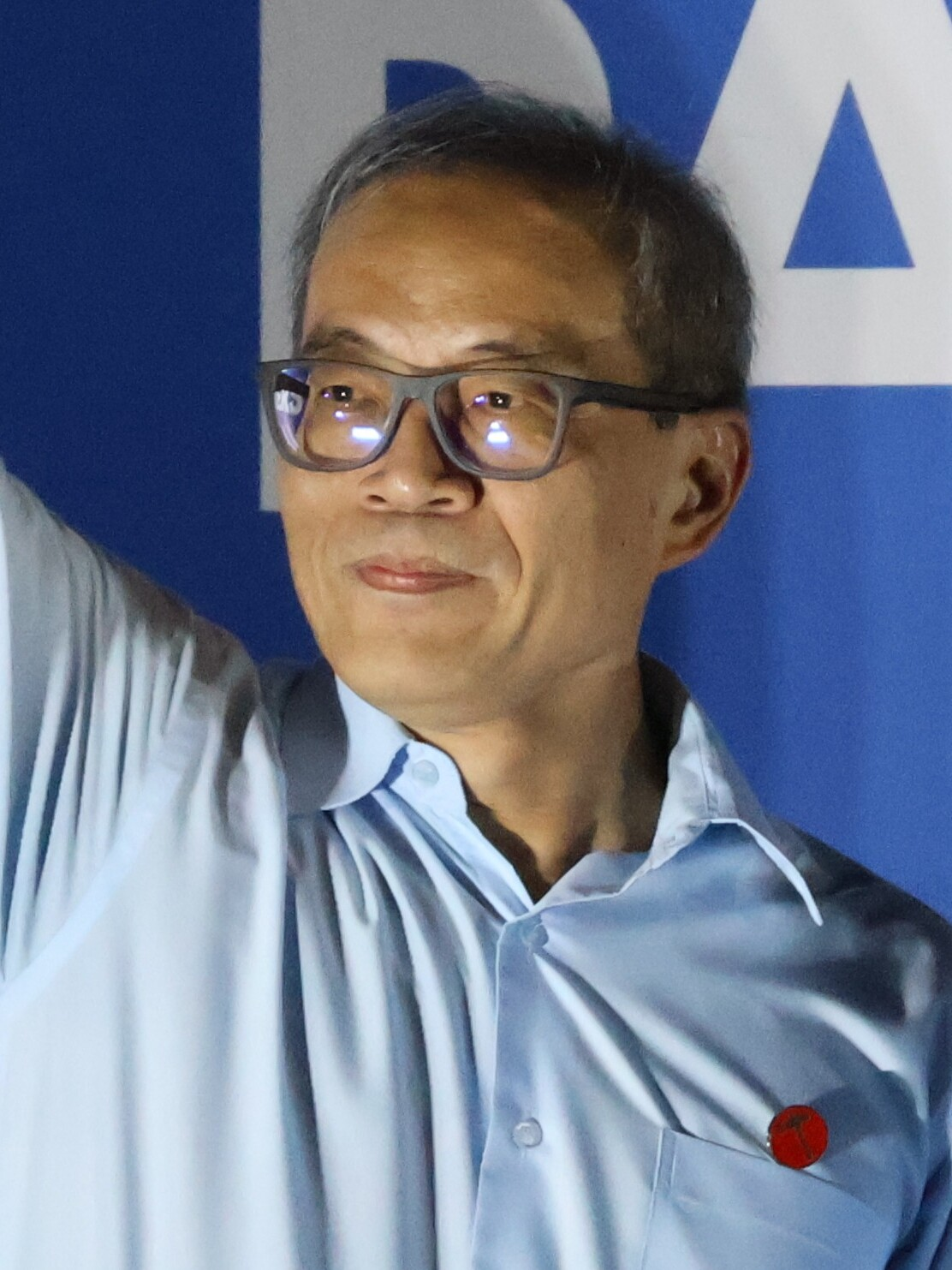
- Tan in 2025

Member of Parliament for Hougang SMC
- Incumbent
- Assumed office 10 July 2020
- Preceded by: Png Eng Huat
- Majority: 2020: 5,660 (22.42%); 2025: 6,629 (24.3%)

Organising Secretary of the Workers' Party
- Incumbent
- Assumed office 12 April 2018 Serving with He Ting Ru
- Preceded by: Png Eng Huat

Non-Constituency Member of the 13th Parliament of Singapore
- In office 16 September 2015 – 22 June 2020 Serving with Leon Perera; Daniel Goh
- Preceded by: Yee Jenn Jong; Gerald Giam; Lina Chiam
- Succeeded by: Leong Mun Wai; Hazel Poa

Personal details
- Born: Dennis Tan Lip Fong; 31 August 1970 (age 56) Singapore
- Party: Workers' Party
- Spouse: Tan Hui Tsing
- Children: 1
- Education: University of Nottingham (LLB); University of Southampton (LLM)
- Occupation: Politician; Lawyer

Dennis Tan Lip Fong (Note: Chinese: 陈立峰; pinyin: Chén Lìfēng) (born 31 August 1970) is a Singaporean politician and lawyer. A member of the Workers' Party (WP), he was a Non-Constituency Member of Parliament (NCMP) between 2015 and 2020, and has been the Member of Parliament (MP) for Hougang Single Member Constituency (SMC) since 2020.

== Education ==
Tan was educated at Nanyang Primary School, Raffles Institution and Raffles Junior College; he later studied law at the University of Nottingham. After graduating with a Bachelor of Laws (Honours) in 1994, Tan attended the Bar Professional Training Course ("bar school") and served as a barrister-at-law at the Middle Temple until 1997. He went on to complete a Master of Laws in maritime law at the University of Southampton in 2005.

== Career ==
Tan has practised law as a shipping lawyer since 1997, the same year he became an advocate and solicitor at the Supreme Court of Singapore. He re-qualified as a solicitor at the Supreme Court of England and Wales (now the Senior Courts of England and Wales) in 1999 while working in English law firm Stephenson Harwood.

Tan formerly belonged to Ang & Partners, a shipping law firm. In 2005, he started DennisMathiew, another such firm, with a partner. He is a fellow of the Chartered Institute of Arbitrators in the United Kingdom.

=== Political career ===
Tan started volunteering for the WP during the 2011 general election, becoming a member in early 2012. He contested Fengshan SMC during the 2015 general election, obtaining 42.5% of the vote against Cheryl Chan, fellow political newcomer and candidate for the governing People's Action Party (PAP). Following the election, Tan was appointed as an NCMP in the 13th Parliament.

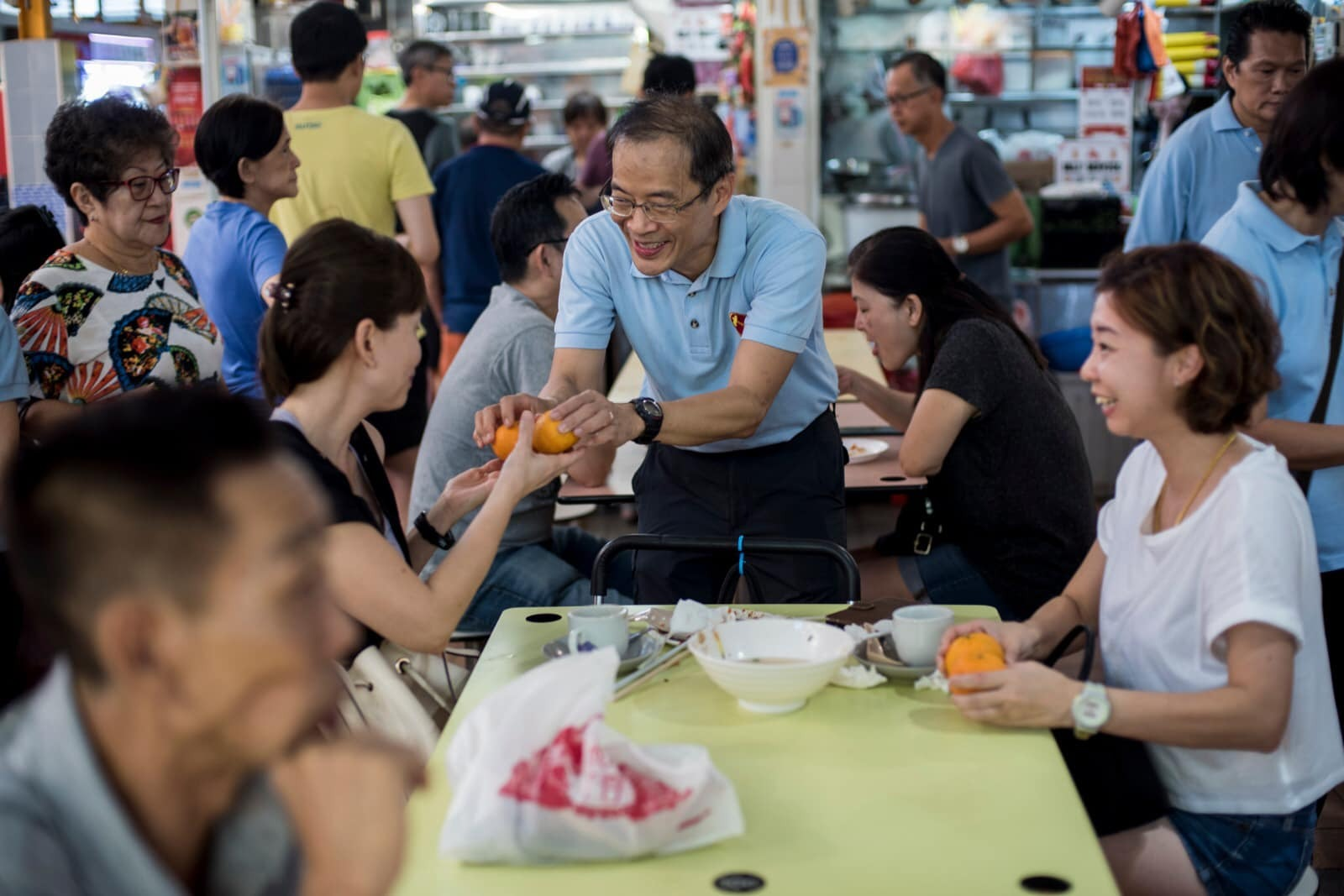
Tan on a walkabout

During the 2020 general election, Tan stood for the WP in party stronghold Hougang SMC, replacing incumbent Png Eng Huat, who had retired from politics. During the campaign, the Elections Department (ELD) said that complaints had been made about posters for his candidacy being hung below the required height of 2.2m. It also said that he should file a report regarding an allegation, made by a supposedly witnessing resident of Hougang SMC, that members of the PAP had pulled them down. Tan retained the seat for the WP after defeating PAP candidate Lee Hong Chuang with 61.21% of the vote.

During the 2025 general election, Tan contested in Hougang SMC. Tan defended his seat with 62.15% of the vote against the People's Action Party candidate Marshall Lim. Tan continued to represent Hougang SMC.

==== Party positions ====
In September 2013, Tan was co-opted into the Central Executive Committee (CEC) of the WP. He was subsequently elected to the CEC in 2014 as the vice-chairperson of the party's Media Team. Having been the WP's treasurer between 2016 and 2018, Tan has been its organising secretary since 2018.

==== Aljunied—Hougang Town Council ====
Tan has served as the Vice-Chairman of the Aljunied-Hougang Town Council (AHTC) since 2024 and previously serving as its Chairman from 2020 to 2024.

== Personal life ==
Tan is a Christian. He is married to Tan Hui Tsing, a fellow lawyer and WP member; they have a daughter.

Tan enjoys running and cycling, as well as non-fiction, historical, political and biographical reading. He has participated in triathlons, and is fluent in Hokkien and Teochew.

== Notes ==
Parliament of Singapore
Preceded by Png Eng Huat	Member of Parliament for Hougang SMC; 2020–present	Incumbent
Preceded by Gerald Giam; Yee Jenn Jong; Lina Chiam	Non-constituency Member of Parliament; 2015–2020; Served alongside: Leon Perera, Daniel Goh (since 2016)	Succeeded by Hazel Poa; Leong Mun Wai
