= Tony Tan Lay Thiam =

Singaporean politician

Tony Tan
- 陈礼添
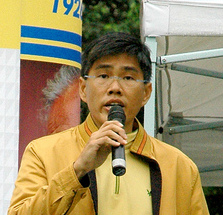
- Tan speaking at a Reform Party rally in January 2011.

Personal details
- Born: 1970 (age 55–56) Singapore
- Party: Progress Singapore Party (2019–present)
- Other political affiliations: Reform Party (2009–2011); National Solidarity Party (2011–2015)
- Spouse: Hazel Poa
- Children: 2
- Education: University of Cambridge
- Profession: Politician; businessman

Tony Tan Lay Thiam (Note: Chinese: 陈礼添; Pe̍h-ōe-jī: Tân Lé-thiam) (born 1970) is a Singaporean politician and businessman.

== Education ==
Tan attended Victoria Junior College before receiving a Singapore Armed Forces Merit Scholarship to study Engineering at Trinity College, Cambridge where he graduated with first class honours. Tan also holds a BSci (BioMed) degree from Central Queensland University and an MBA from the University of Leicester.

== Career ==
=== Military career ===
After completing his degree, Tan served in the Singapore Army and was promoted to the rank of Major when he was 27. During his service, he was named Top Student for the Basic Army Intelligence Course, Company Tactics Course and Combat Engineer Advanced Officer Course. Tan left the Singapore Army in 2001.

=== Business career ===
In 1999, Tan and Hazel Poa, his wife, established Smartlab Education Centre Pte Ltd, a chain of education centres. Tan was a recipient of the Spirit of Enterprise Award in 2006 and the company under his leadership was a recipient of a Singapore Prestige Brand Award (Promising Brand) in 2007.

=== Political career ===
Tan and Poa joined the Reform Party ahead of the 2011 general election and were slated to stand as candidates for the party in the election. However they were among six members of the party who resigned in February 2011 due to differences of opinion with the party's leaders.

Tan and Poa then joined the National Solidarity Party. In the 2011 general election, Tan and Poa were members of the party's five-person team which stood in the Chua Chu Kang Group Representation Constituency. The NSP team lost to the People's Action Party (PAP) team by 56,885 votes (38.8%) to 89,710 (61.2%).

On 17 April 2025, the Progress Singapore Party announced Tan as its candidate for Kebun Baru SMC during the 2025 general election. He received 31.5% of the vote and was not elected.

== Personal life ==
Tan met Poa while they were both students at Cambridge. They married and have two adopted sons.
