= Leon Perera =

Former Singaporean politician (born 1970)

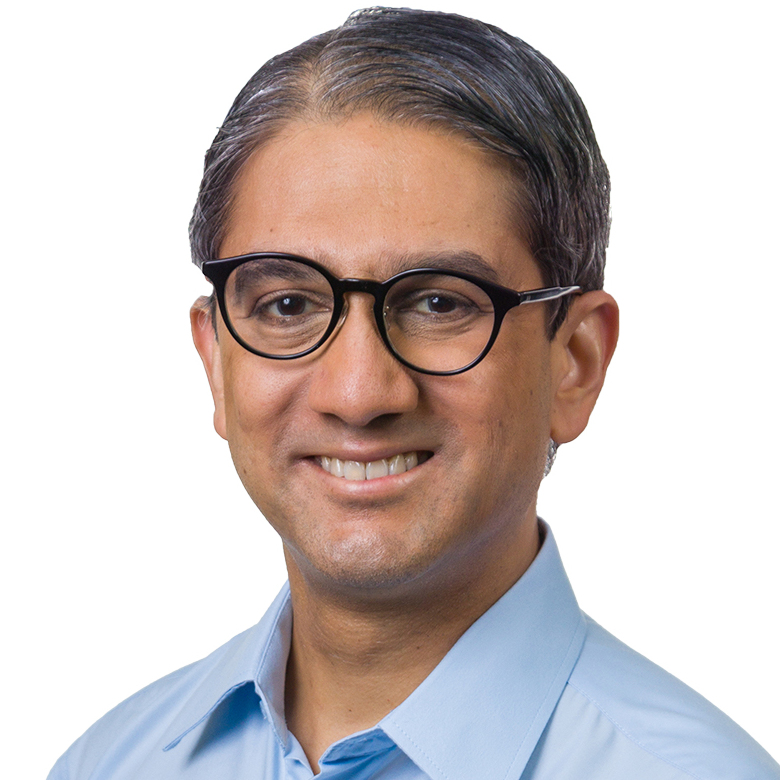
- Official portrait, 2021

Member of the Singapore Parliament for Aljunied GRC
- In office 10 July 2020 – 19 July 2023
- Preceded by: WP held
- Succeeded by: WP held
- Majority: 28,485 (19.90%)

Non-Constituency Member of the 13th Parliament of Singapore
- In office 16 September 2015 – 22 June 2020 Serving with Daniel Goh and Dennis Tan
- Preceded by: Yee Jenn Jong; Gerald Giam; Lina Chiam
- Succeeded by: Leong Mun Wai; Hazel Poa

Personal details
- Born: Leon Anil Perera; 28 September 1970 (age 56) Singapore
- Other political affiliations: Workers' Party (2013–2023)
- Spouse: Carol Perera (m. 2003)
- Children: 2
- Education: Exeter College, Oxford (MA)
- Occupation: Politician

Leon Anil Perera (born 28 September 1970) is a Singaporean activist and politician. A former member of the Workers' Party (WP), Perera has been the Non-Constituency Member of Singapore (NCMP) between 2015 to 2020. He has been the Member of Parliament (MP) for the Serangoon division of Aljunied Group Representation Constituency (GRC) between 2020 and 2023.

== Education ==
Perera was born in Singapore in 1970. He was educated at the Anglo-Chinese School and Hwa Chong Junior College before graduating from Exeter College, Oxford at the University of Oxford with a Bachelor of Arts with double first class honours (later promoted to Master of Arts by seniority) degree in philosophy, politics and economics (PPE).

== Career ==
Perera began his career as a senior officer at the International Business Development Division of the Economic Development Board (EDB). He went on to serve as Assistant Head in the Enterprise Development Division, where he assisted in the growth of large Singaporean companies in the service sector.

Perera was the co-founder and chief executive officer of Spire Research and Consulting, an international business research and consulting agency. He is also a member of the Economic Society of Singapore, the Economic Development Board Society and the Singapore Institute of Directors.

Perera was active in civil society before joining politics. He served on the committee of local human rights organisation Maruah, as the vice-president of migrant worker rights organisation Humanitarian Organization for Migration Economics (HOME), and as an adviser to alternative news website The Independent.

=== Political career ===
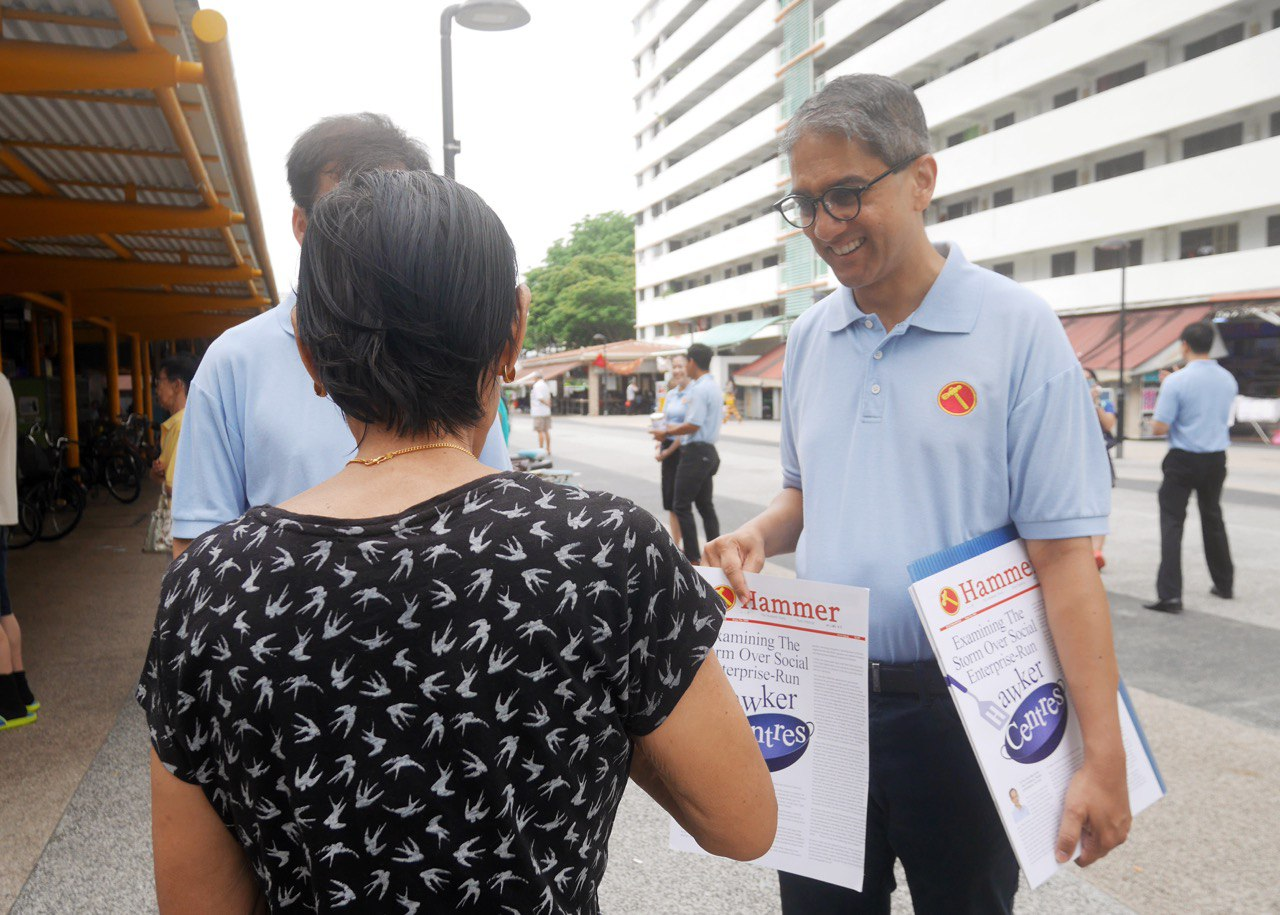
Perera on a walkabout

Before running as a candidate, Perera was a WP grassroots activist in the Paya Lebar division of Aljunied GRC.

==== Non-constituency Member of Parliament ====
Perera made his political debut during the 2015 general election in the four-member East Coast GRC. His team received 39.27% of the vote, losing to the governing People's Action Party (PAP). After the election, one member of the WP team was to be nominated to take up the third of three NCMP seats; the first two had been offered to better-performing defeated candidates in single-member constituencies (SMCs). The WP thus nominated Perera as an NCMP in the 13th Parliament.

Following the Hepatitis C outbreak at Singapore General Hospital in October 2015 which led to the deaths of five patients, Perera called on the government to convene a Committee of Inquiry to help "restore confidence" in Singapore's public health institutions.

==== Elected Member of Parliament ====
During the 2020 general election, Perera joined the WP team for the WP-held five-member Aljunied GRC. He became the MP for the Serangoon division of the GRC after the WP defeated the PAP with 59.95% of the vote.

==== Affair and resignation ====
On 19 July 2023, the WP announced that Perera and senior party leader Nicole Seah had resigned from the party, after a video was published on Facebook showing the two “behaving intimately” with one another. Perera also resigned from Parliament. Party leader Pritam Singh told the press that he would have revoked the party memberships of both if they had not resigned, as they had initially lied that there was no affair when first asked about rumours of an affair between them following the 2020 general election.

=== Post-political career ===
Perera held a closed-door discussion on politics and elections in Singapore at a bookshop on 20 May 2024.

In August 2024, Perera was reported to be assisting the Progress Singapore Party (PSP) on an informal basis, though he did not become a member of the party; a spokesperson for the party confirmed that Perera was still a volunteer with the party as of January 2025. Perera would later take up an executive director role for a consultancy firm, moving to New York City as part of his new role; observers stated that he was highly unlikely to contest the 2025 general election as a result, although he was spotted at the PSP's headquarters in the lead up to the election, fueling speculation that he would run. PSP chairman Tan Cheng Bock would later confirm that Perera would not be standing as a candidate. During one of the PSP's rallies for the election, Perera appeared as an emcee for the rally.

=== Policies and views ===
Perera's maiden speech as elected MP called for social safety nets to be strengthened, widened, and made easier to access. He highlighted the need to respect the role of civil society and for the government to be less resistant to a more plural political landscape, so as to foster a more antifragile society. He also called for greater support for entrepreneurs.

In 2021, Perera raised a motion on gender equality with He Ting Ru, WP MP for Sengkang GRC. In the same year, Perera filed an adjournment motion on hawker policy reform.

Perera also frequently focused on public accountability issues in his speeches. In 2019, he participated in the debate on the Protection from Online Falsehoods and Manipulation Act (POFMA), calling it "a cure worse than the disease" and accusing it of giving too much power to individual ministers. He also argued that it could stifle free speech in Singapore. The law was passed on 8 May of the same year.

During the debate on the Foreign Interference (Countermeasures) Act 2021, he moved amendments, arguing that they were needed to boost transparency and resist elite capture resulting from the powers granted by the bill.

On healthcare, Perera raised an adjournment motion on preventive health reform in 2022, responding to Singapore's poor track record on chronic diseases such as diabetes, by calling on the Government to adopt a highly targeted, outcome-based approach with regular reviews. Other proposals were to nudge target groups through subsidies and leverage the large amount of data available to flag health issues out to patients at visits to the doctor.

On climate change and the environment, Perera raised an adjournment motion in 2016 calling on the Government to boost support for new industries with non-economic benefits, including renewable energy and environmental technology.

During the 2022 debate on the Carbon Pricing (Amendment) Bill, Perera and He Ting Ru also filed amendments to the bill placing limitations on how allowances may be granted to taxable facilities, as well as the introduction of a registry requiring Ministers to disclose decisions to grant allowances and the use of international carbon credits.

== Personal life ==
Perera is married with a daughter and a son.

Parliament of Singapore
Preceded by Sylvia Lim	Member of Parliament for Aljunied GRC (Serangoon); 2020–2023	Succeeded by Kenneth Tiong (2025)
Preceded by Gerald Giam; Yee Jenn Jong; Lina Chiam	Non-Constituency Member of Parliament; 2015–2020; Served alongside: Dennis Tan, Daniel Goh	Succeeded by Hazel Poa; Leong Mun Wai
