= Lina Loh =

Singaporean politician

- 罗文丽
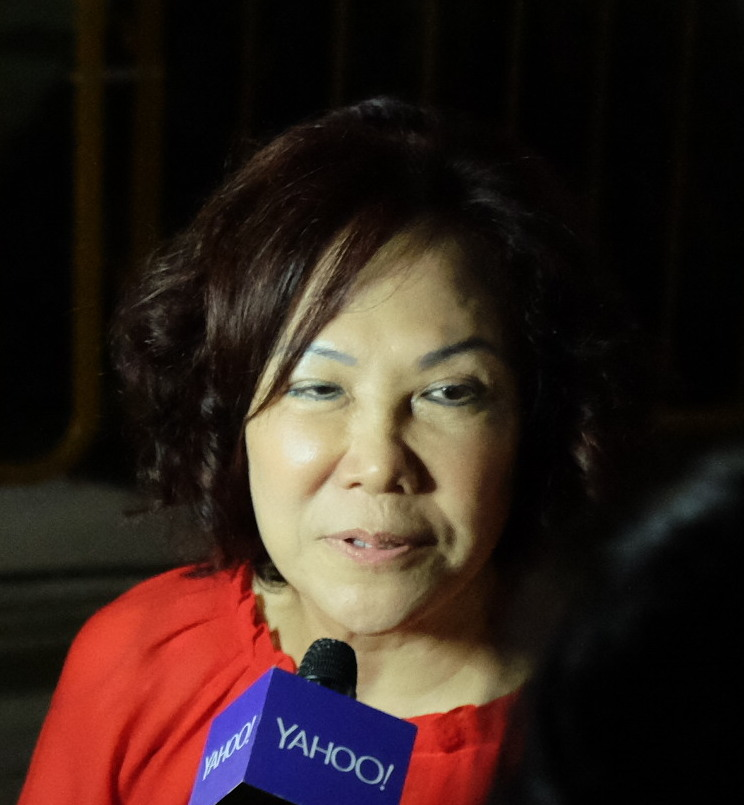
- Loh in 2015

2nd Chair of the Singapore People's Party
- In office 2012–2019
- Secretary-General: Chiam See Tong
- Preceded by: Sin Kek Tong
- Succeeded by: Jose Raymond

Non-Constituency Member of the 12th Parliament of Singapore
- In office 12 May 2011 – 23 August 2015 Serving with Yee Jenn Jong; Gerald Giam
- Preceded by: Sylvia Lim
- Succeeded by: Daniel Goh; Dennis Tan; Leon Perera

Personal details
- Born: Kuala Lumpur, Federation of Malaya
- Party: Singapore People's Party
- Spouse: Chiam See Tong (m. 1975)
- Children: 1
- Occupation: Politician

Lina Loh Woon Lee, (Note: Chinese: 罗文丽; pinyin: Luó Wénlì) also known as Lina Chiam, is a Singaporean former politician who has previously served as the Non-Constituency Member of Parliament (NCMP) between 2011 and 2015 and has been the vice-chairperson of the Singapore People's Party since 2019.

Loh contested in the 2011 and 2015 general elections in Potong Pasir SMC, but lost to the governing People's Action Party's Sitoh Yih Pin in both elections.

She was the chairwoman of Singapore People's Party (SPP) between 2012 and 2019 and committee member of Singapore People's Party since 2019.

== Political career ==
=== 2011 general election ===
Loh formally entered politics during the 2011 general election when she contested as a SPP candidate in Potong Pasir SMC. Loh ultimately lost to the PAP candidate Sitoh Yih Pin by a narrow margin of 114 votes (0.72%), garnering 49.64% of the vote against Sitoh's 50.36%.

Despite her electoral defeat as the best performing defeated candidate, Loh qualified for a seat in the 12th Parliament as a Non-constituency Member of Parliament (NCMP) by virtue of being one of the "best losers" in an election in which fewer than nine opposition Members of Parliament had been elected. She accepted the NCMP seat on 12 May 2011 and served in the 12th Parliament from 12 May 2011 to 23 August 2015.

=== 2015 general election ===
During the 2015 general election, Loh contested under the SPP banner in Potong Pasir SMC, but lost to the PAP's Sitoh Yih Pin again, garnering 33.61% of the vote against Sitoh's 66.39%. Since there were six opposition Members of Parliament who had been elected in the 2015 general election, only three NCMP seats would be offered. Loh's electoral result in Potong Pasir SMC was lower than that of the other opposition candidates so she was not offered a NCMP seat in the 13th Parliament.

=== 2020 general election and after ===
Loh and Chiam did not contest in the 2020 general election due to Chiam's declining health, which had led to him stepping down from his position as the SPP's secretary-general on 16 October 2019. Loh remains a member of the SPP's central executive committee after stepping down as its chairwoman in 2019.

== Charity work ==
On 9 March 2017, Loh and Chiam launched the Chiam See Tong Sports Fund at the Old Parliament House to help needy athletes achieve their sporting dreams. They are the co-patrons of the organisation, which is chaired by their daughter, Camilla Chiam.

== Personal life ==
Loh was born in the 1940s to a Hakka Chinese family in Sungai Besi, Kuala Lumpur, which was then part of the Federation of Malaya. After training as a nurse at the Royal London Hospital, she worked in the Singaporean nursing sector for two years. She later left the profession to manage administrative work at Chiam's law firm, Chiam & Co, which operated from 1976 to 2002.

Loh met Chiam in London in 1973. They married in Singapore in 1975 when Chiam was 40 and Loh was 26, and have a daughter, Camilla.

== Notes ==
Political offices
Parliament of Singapore
| Preceded by Sylvia Lim | Non-Constituency Member of Parliament; 2011 - 2015; Served alongside: Yee Jenn Jong, Gerald Giam | Succeeded by Daniel Goh; Dennis Tan; Leon Perera |
