= Daniel Goh =

Singaporean politician

- 吴佩松

Non-Constituency Member of the 13th Parliament of Singapore
- In office 4 February 2016 – 22 June 2020 Serving with Leon Perera and Dennis Tan
- Preceded by: Yee Jenn Jong; Gerald Giam; Lina Chiam
- Succeeded by: Leong Mun Wai; Hazel Poa

Personal details
- Born: Daniel Goh Pei Siong; 1973 (age 52–53) Singapore
- Other political affiliations: Workers' Party (2011–2023)

Daniel Goh Pei Siong (Note: Chinese: 吴佩松; Pe̍h-ōe-jī: Gô͘ Pōe-siông; pinyin: Wú Pèisōng) (born 1973) is a Singaporean sociologist and former politician. A former member of the opposition Workers' Party (WP), he was a non-constituency Member of Parliament (NCMP) between 2015 and 2020.

A sociologist by profession, he has primarily researched on political sociology, urban sociology, cultural studies, sociology of religion, and sociology of ethnic and multicultural relations.

Goh was expelled from the WP in 2023 after publicly criticising the party leadership on their handling of a false allegation Raeesah Khan had made in Parliament.

== Education ==
Goh studied at St Joseph's Institution and completed his undergraduate and graduate studies in Sociology at the National University of Singapore (NUS). He was then awarded the International Institute Fellowship, Department of Sociology Teaching Fellowship and the Rackham Graduate Fellowship to pursue his doctoral study in sociology at the University of Michigan in Ann Arbor from 2000 to 2005.

== Academic career ==
On his return to NUS in 2005, he was appointed assistant professor at the Department of Sociology. In 2012, he was awarded tenure and promoted to associate professor. As of October 2017, he was the Associate Provost of Undergraduate Education at NUS. He had previously been the deputy head of the Department of Sociology and the convener of the Cultural Studies Minor and Cultural Studies in Asia PhD Programme.

== Political career ==
Goh began supporting the WP in 1988, when he attended his first political rally at Eunos. He started volunteering with the party in the 2011 general election and joined as a member in 2013.

Goh made his political debut in the 2015 general election, contesting East Coast Group Representation Constituency (GRC) as part of a four-member team. The WP team lost with 39.27% of the vote to the governing People's Action Party (PAP); having received the third-highest share of the vote among defeated opposition candidates, they were to select one of their members to accept the third of three seats offered under the non-constituency Member of Parliament (NCMP) scheme. Leon Perera accepted it; however, Goh was denoted as being under consideration for becoming an NCMP after Lee Li Lian, another WP member who had unsuccessfully run for reelection in Punggol East Single Member Constituency (SMC), refused the NCMP seat offered to her. In 2016, he was made an NCMP through a parliamentary motion.

During a parliamentary debate on 26 February 2019, Goh asked for the retirement age to be removed to allow workers to age with "dignity and independence". He said that it would reform the system, ensuring that Singaporeans "do not have to worry about their finances and can retire in their 60s if they want to, but they can also continue to work if they want to."

On 21 April 2020, the WP announced that, due to a health condition, Goh would not run in the upcoming general election and would resign from various party posts except his position on the Central Executive Committee (CEC).

=== Expulsion from WP ===
In August 2021, Raeesah Khan, then-WP MP for Sengkang GRC, lied in a parliamentary debate, alleging that the Singapore Police Force had mishandled a sexual assault case. After admitting to the lie and making apologies, she resigned in November of the same year. Goh made several Facebook posts questioning her resignation; he also told the party leadership to "take some responsibility for allowing the transgression to persist". A party disciplinary committee was formed to investigate the posts in September 2022.

On 26 May 2023, Goh was formally expelled from the WP over his posts on Raeesah's resignation; he responded by calling his political retirement "complete".

== Notes ==
Parliament of Singapore
Preceded by Gerald Giam; Yee Jenn Jong; Lina Chiam	Non-Constituency Member of Parliament; 2016 - 2020; Served alongside: Dennis Tan, Leon Perera	Succeeded by Hazel Poa; Leong Mun Wai
