= Yee Jenn Jong =

Singaporean former politician (born 1965)

- 余振忠
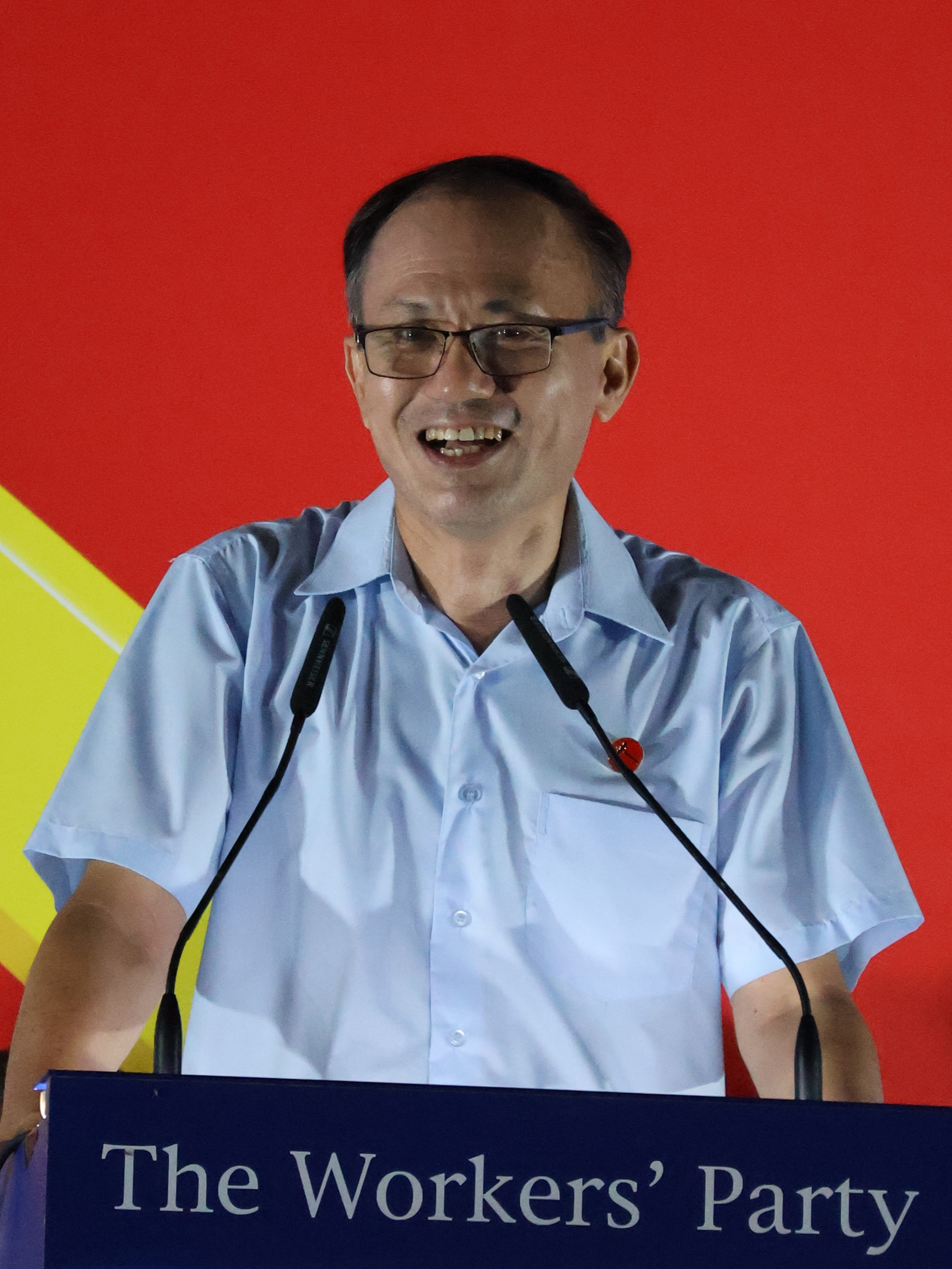
- Yee in 2025

Non-constituency Member of the 12th Parliament of Singapore
- In office 16 May 2011 – 24 August 2015 Serving with Gerald Giam
- Preceded by: Sylvia Lim
- Succeeded by: Daniel Goh; Dennis Tan; Leon Perera

Personal details
- Born: Yee Jenn Jong; 24 March 1965 (age 61) Singapore
- Citizenship: Singaporean
- Party: Workers' Party
- Education: National University of Singapore; Nanyang Technological University

Yee Jenn Jong (Chinese: 余振忠; pinyin: Yú Zhènzhōng; born 24 March 1965) is a Singaporean former politician. A member of the Workers' Party (WP), he was a Non-constituency Member of Parliament (NCMP) between 2011 and 2015.

== Education ==
Yee studied at St Stephen's School and then St Patrick's School for his secondary education. He went on to study at Temasek Junior College. Yee later obtained a Bachelor of Science in computer science (Hons) from National University of Singapore (NUS), a Master of Science in computer science from NUS and a Master of Business Administration from Nanyang Technological University.

== Career ==
Yee is also a self-styled education entrepreneur and consultant, as well as the founder of The Learning Grid and 360 Education. He is also the author of the book, Journey in Blue - A Peek into the Workers' Party of Singapore, published in 2020 by World Scientific., as well as Non-Constituency Members of Parliament: What's Next for the Scheme? (published 2024) and StepUp: The Workers' Party of Singapore 2.0 (published 2026). He is an author in World Scientific's World of Science Comic Series with the book Adventures with Energy, Adventures with Forces and Adventures with Man & the Environment.

=== Political career ===
Yee first stepped into politics in 2011 contesting in the Joo Chiat Single Member Constituency (SMC) against Charles Chong from the People's Action Party (PAP). Although he lost marginally with 48.99% of the votes, he finished as the second best loser in an election and was appointed to an NCMP position in the 12th Parliament of Singapore. It was confirmed by Workers' Party on 13 May 2011 that Yee would be taking up the NCMP position. With Yee taking up the NCMP position together with Gerald Giam, WP set a new record in the Singapore's post-independence political arena becoming the first non-ruling party to have 8 (6 MP + 2 NCMP) seats in parliament.

Yee contested in a five-member WP team for Marine Parade Group Representation Constituency (GRC) in the 2015 general election. The team gained 35.93% of the votes losing to the PAP team.

in the 2020 general election, Yee contested in a five-member WP team for Marine Parade GRC again. The team won 42.26% of the votes losing to the PAP team, an improvement of six percent of the votes. Following this election, Yee repeatedly stated that he had "largely retired from active politics".

On 22 April 2025, a day before nomination day for the 2025 general election, Yee, in a WP's video, said he will be "... stepping up – again", fueling speculation that he will contest the election despite his previous stance. On 23 April, Yee led a team, comprising Nathaniel Koh, Paris V. Parameswari, Sufyan Mikhail Putra and Jasper Kuan to contest the East Coast Group Representation Constituency against the PAP team. Eventually, Yee and his team lost to the PAP team led by Minister Edwin Tong with 41.27% of the votes. In aftermath of his loss, Yee announced that he will retire from electoral politics, but will remain with the Workers' Party.

Political offices
Parliament of Singapore
Preceded by Sylvia Lim	Non-Constituency Member of Parliament; 2011–2015; Served alongside: Lina Chiam, Gerald Giam	Succeeded by Dennis Tan; Leon Perera; Daniel Goh
