= Andre Low =

Singaporean politician (born 1991)

The Honourable Andre Low
- 刘宇扬
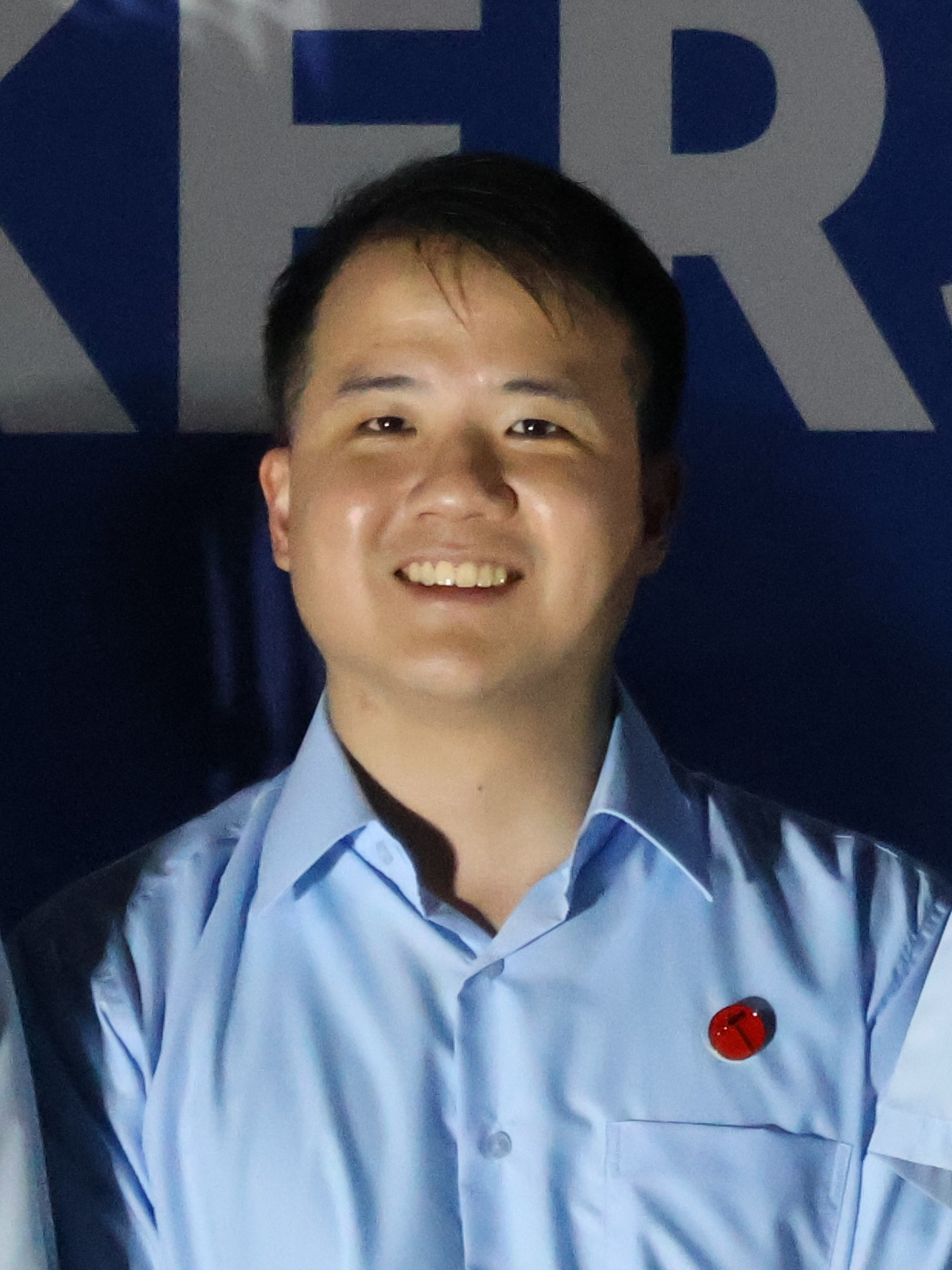
- Low in 2025

Non-Constituency Member of the 15th Parliament of Singapore
- Incumbent
- Assumed office 19 May 2025 Serving with Eileen Chong
- Preceded by: Leong Mun Wai; Hazel Poa

Deputy Head of the Media Team of the Workers' Party
- Incumbent
- Assumed office 17 July 2024
- Preceded by: Lee Li Lian

Personal details
- Born: Andre Low Wu Yang; 7 May 1991 (age 35) Singapore
- Party: Workers' Party
- Education: University College London (LLB); INSEAD (MBA)
- Occupation: Politician; product manager; consultant; lawyer
- Website: Official website

Andre Low Wu Yang (Note: Chinese: 刘宇扬; pinyin: Liú Yǔyáng) (born 7 May 1991) is a Singaporean politician. A member of the opposition Workers' Party (WP), he has been a Non-Constituency Member of Parliament (NCMP) since 19 May 2025.

== Early life and education ==
Low was the only child in his family; both his parents were teachers working for the Ministry of Education. He studied at University College London, graduating as third in his cohort and earning a Bachelor of Laws, and also holds a Master of Business Administration from INSEAD.

== Pre-political career ==
Low first worked as a dispute lawyer with Drew & Napier, under the mentorship of senior counsel Davinder Singh. He then moved to the start-up sector where he developed products in legal-tech, urban mobility and health-tech, before joining Amazon Web Services and subsequently becoming a consultant with the Boston Consulting Group. He now works as a product manager in a fintech company.

== Political career ==
Low joined the WP in 2020, and served as a secretarial assistant to Louis Chua, elected MP for Sengkang Group Representation Constituency (GRC), for about three years. He became a member of the party's media team in 2023.

On 18 April 2025, Low was unveiled as part of a group of new WP candidates for the 2025 general election. He made his political debut in the newly created Jalan Kayu Single Member Constituency (SMC) against Ng Chee Meng, the candidate for the governing People's Action Party (PAP). Ng had been a cabinet minister and MP for Pasir Ris–Punggol GRC; however, he was defeated by the WP when leading a team for the newly created Sengkang GRC in 2020.

During the campaigning period of the election, several private chat messages allegedly texted by Low surfaced on Reddit and Facebook. These messages allegedly showed him voicing discontent on a variety of subjects, some including the use of profanity. In response, Low apologised for his "completely inappropriate" language, stating that he was "not proud of the way [he] expressed [his] views" and that "there [was] no excuse for using such language or making disparaging comments about anyone – especially those who [had] placed their trust in [him]".

On polling day, Low lost to Ng by 809 votes; this was the smallest victory margin by a PAP candidate in the general election. Being the best-performing defeated opposition candidate, Low became eligible for an NCMP seat. On 19 May, the WP announced that he would become an NCMP alongside Eileen Chong, one of five WP candidates for Tampines GRC.

In June 2025, Low was co-opted, as the deputy head of the media team, to the Central Executive Committee (CEC) of the WP alongside Chong, Abdul Muhaimin and Kenneth Tiong.

== Personal life ==
Low is married and expecting a child as of April 2025. His interests include skiing, building Legos and electronics. Low is also an amateur beatboxer.

== Notes ==
Parliament of Singapore
Preceded by Leong Mun Wai; Hazel Poa	Non-Constituency Member of Parliament; 2025 - present Served alongside: Eileen Chong	Incumbent
