= Hazel Poa =

Singaporean politician and businesswoman

- 潘群勤
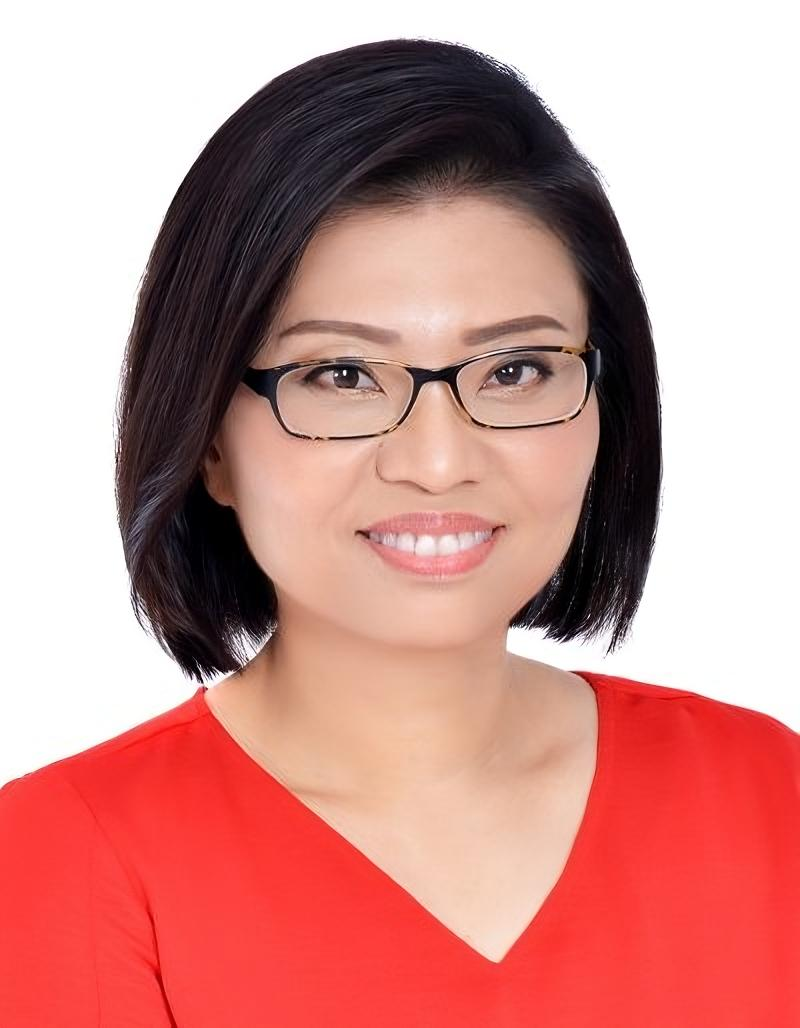
- Official portrait, 2024

Non-Constituency Member of the 14th Parliament of Singapore
- In office 24 August 2020 – 15 April 2025 Serving with Leong Mun Wai
- Preceded by: Dennis Tan; Daniel Goh; Leon Perera
- Succeeded by: Andre Low; Eileen Chong

4th Secretary-General of the Progress Singapore Party
- In office 20 February 2024 – 26 March 2025
- Chairman: Tan Cheng Bock
- Preceded by: Leong Mun Wai
- Succeeded by: Leong Mun Wai

2nd Vice Chairperson of the Progress Singapore Party
- In office 4 April 2023 – 20 February 2024
- Preceded by: Wang Swee Chuang

3rd Secretary-General of the National Solidarity Party
- In office 26 June 2011 – 25 October 2013
- Preceded by: Goh Meng Seng
- Succeeded by: Jeannette Chong-Aruldoss

Personal details
- Born: 27 August 1970 (age 56) Singapore
- Party: Progress Singapore Party
- Other political affiliations: Reform Party (2009–2011); National Solidarity Party (2011–2015)
- Spouse: Tony Tan Lay Thiam
- Children: 2
- Education: University of Cambridge
- Profession: Politician; businesswoman

Hazel Poa Koon Koon (Note: Chinese: 潘群勤; Pe̍h-ōe-jī: Phoaⁿ Kûn-khûn) (born 27 August 1970) is a Singaporean politician and businesswoman. A member of the opposition Progress Singapore Party (PSP), Poa served as Secretary-General of the PSP from 2024 to 2025 and as a Non-Constituency Member of Parliament (NCMP) between 2020 to 2025.

A Public Service Commission scholar, Poa graduated from the University of Cambridge in 1992 with a first-class honours degree in mathematics. After graduation, she worked as a civil servant before joining the financial industry and starting her own business.

Poa was a member of the Reform Party before joining the National Solidarity Party (NSP) in 2011. She was Secretary-General of the NSP from June 2011 to September 2013, and acting Secretary-General from June 2015 to August 2015. She was the Vice-Chairman of the Progress Singapore Party from 2023 to 2024, and was elected as Secretary-General on 20 February 2024. Poa was appointed as secretary-general of the Progress Singapore Party on 20 February 2024 following the resignation of Leong Mun Wai after the Singapore government issued a POFMA order which refuted the falsehoods made by Leong on his Facebook post.

== Education ==
Poa attended the University of Cambridge on a scholarship from Singapore's Public Service Commission, completing a degree in Mathematics with first class honours. At Cambridge, she met her future husband, Tony Tan Lay Thiam, also a government scholar.

== Civil career ==
Upon completing her degree, Poa returned to serve in the Singapore Civil Service and was appointed to the Administrative Service. She was first posted to the Prime Minister's Office, where she worked in the Public Service Division, handling personnel policies within the civil service. She later became Assistant Director for Indirect Taxation at the Ministry of Finance.

== Business career ==
After four years, Poa left the civil service and joined the investment department of an insurance company as an analyst. She later worked as an assistant fund manager before starting her own business. Poa and her husband run a private school in Singapore and a chain of education centres in Singapore and Indonesia.

== Political career ==
Poa and her husband first joined the Reform Party in 2009, ahead of the 2011 general election. They had been slated to stand as candidates for the party in the election, but were later among six members of the party who resigned in February 2011 due to disagreements with the party's leadership. Poa and Tan later joined the National Solidarity Party.

=== 2011 general election ===
In the 2011 general election, Poa along with team members, Sebastian Teo, Tony Tan, Nor Lella Mardiiiah and Mohamed Jeisilan Sivalingam contested in Chua Chu Kang GRC. The NSP's team lost to the team from the governing People's Action Party (PAP) by 56,885 votes (38.8%) to 89,710 (61.2%). In June 2011, Poa was elected as the Secretary-General of the NSP by the Central Executive Council following the resignation of Goh Meng Seng. She was the first woman to be elected Secretary-General of the NSP.

Poa resigned as Secretary-General in September 2013 citing health problems.

=== 2015 general election ===
In June 2015, nearly two years after she resigned, Poa was appointed the Acting Secretary-General of the NSP following the resignation of Tan Lam Siong. The party decided against calling a Party Congress to elect a new Secretary-General "in view of the need to focus on preparations for the next general election".

In August 2015, Poa stepped down as Acting Secretary-General and left the party due to disagreements with the party's Central Executive Committee fielding a candidate in the single-member constituency of MacPherson in the 2015 general election, despite the opposition Workers' Party already planning to contest there. On 30 August, Poa was seen helping out with the Singapore Democratic Party team in their walkabout, but did not eventually join the party.

In July 2019, Poa, along with former SDP member Michelle Lee Juen, was elected one of the CEC members of the newly established Progress Singapore Party.

=== 2020 general election ===
Poa, along with a team members, Tan Cheng Bock, Leong Mun Wai, Nadarajah Loganathan and Jeffrey Khoo contested in the 2020 Singaporean general election at West Coast GRC but failed to garner a majority against the incumbent People's Action Party team, but was awarded two seats under the Non-constituency Member of Parliament (NCMP) scheme. In 2020, the PSP announced that they had chosen Poa and Leong Mun Wai for the seats. Poa and Leong were appointed NCMPs from 16 July 2020. On July 20, 2020, Poa stepped down as vice-chairman of PSP to focus on her NCMP duties. She was re-elected vice-chair in 2023. Poa succeeded Leong Mun Wai as PSP secretary-general on 20 February 2024.

== Political positions ==
In September 2020, Poa called on the Singapore government to allow Central Provident Fund members who lost their jobs during the COVID-19 pandemic to borrow from their own CPF accounts, and to explore the option of indexing CPF Life payments to inflation.

In April 2022, Poa called on the Government to reform the parental leave system given that "parenthood is a responsibility that should be shared equally by both parents". Her proposal called for parental leave to be shared equally between parents by default, but parents could adopt other arrangements by mutual agreement, subject to a minimum period of parental leave for each parent.

In February 2023, Poa called on the Government to allow singles aged above 28 to purchase 3-room flats.

Poa raised a number of parliamentary questions in 2023 relating to the prosecution of S Iswaran. In September 2023, she raised a motion in Parliament to suspend Iswaran from MP duties and prevent him from receiving an allowance while not performing duties. In January 2024, she requested an update into Iswaran's investigation by the Corrupt Practices Investigation Bureau.

Poa has been active in calling for institutional reform while in Parliament. In July 2023, Poa raised a private member's motion in Parliament calling for Group Representation Constituencies to be abolished. In August 2024, Poa raised another private member's motion in Parliament, calling for changes to how electoral boundaries are drawn. Her motion was defeated by a 10-76 vote despite receiving support from the Workers' Party.

== Personal life ==
Poa is married to Tony Tan Lay Thiam. They have two adopted sons.

== Notes ==
Parliament of Singapore
Preceded by Daniel Goh; Dennis Tan; Leon Perera	Non-Constituency Member of Parliament; 2020 - 2025; Served alongside: Leong Mun Wai	Succeeded by Andre Low; Eileen Chong
Party political offices
Preceded by Goh Meng Seng	Secretary-General of the National Solidarity Party; 2011 – 2013	Succeeded by Jeannette Chong-Aruldoss
Preceded by Leong Mun Wai	Secretary-General of the Progress Singapore Party; 2024 – present	Incumbent
