= Leong Mun Wai =

Singaporean politician (born 1959)

- 梁文辉
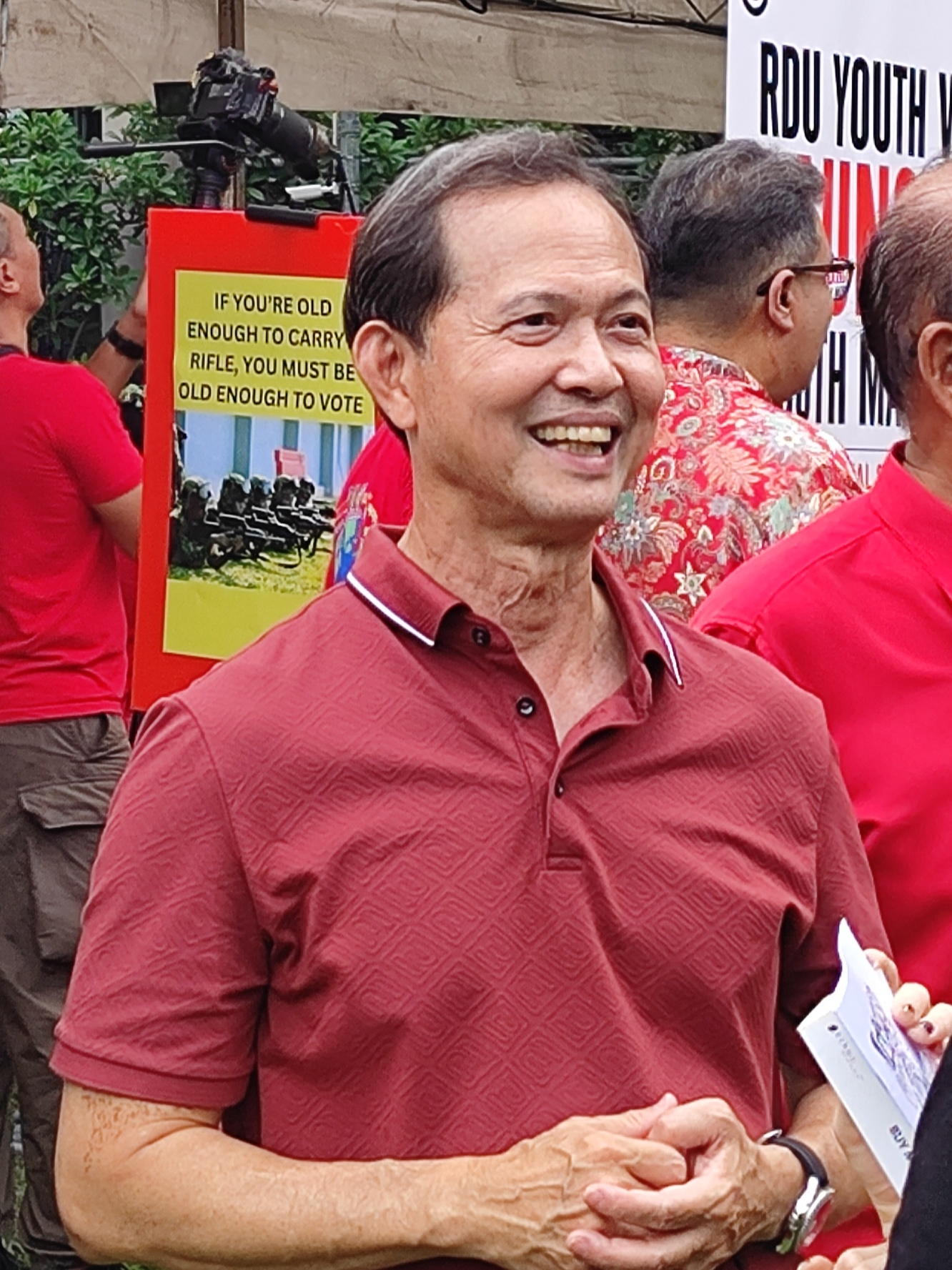
- Leong in 2026

Non-Constituency Member of the 14th Parliament of Singapore
- In office 24 August 2020 – 15 April 2025 Serving with Hazel Poa
- Preceded by: Dennis Tan; Daniel Goh; Leon Perera
- Succeeded by: Andre Low; Eileen Chong

3rd & 5th Secretary-General of the Progress Singapore Party
- Incumbent
- Assumed office 26 March 2025
- Chairman: Tan Cheng Bock; A’bas bin Kasmani
- Preceded by: Hazel Poa
- In office 4 April 2023 – 20 February 2024
- Chairman: Tan Cheng Bock
- Preceded by: Francis Yuen
- Succeeded by: Hazel Poa

1st Assistant Secretary-General of the Progress Singapore Party
- In office 17 January 2020 – 17 July 2020
- Preceded by: Anthony Lee
- Succeeded by: Francis Yuen

Personal details
- Born: 25 September 1959 (age 67) State of Singapore
- Party: Progress Singapore Party
- Education: Raffles Institution
- Alma mater: Hitotsubashi University (BEc); London Business School (MSc)
- Occupation: Politician; business executive
- Website: Official website

Leong Mun Wai (Note: Chinese: 梁文辉; Jyutping: Loeng^{4} Man^{4} Fai^{1}) (born 25 September 1959) is a Singaporean politician and former investment banker who served as Secretary-General of the Progress Singapore Party between 2023 and 2024 and re-elected since 2025 and as a Non-Constituency Member of Parliament (NCMP) between 2020 and 2025.

An Overseas Merit Scholar and Sloan Fellow, Leong worked at the Government of Singapore Investment Corporation (GIC) and Merrill Lynch, before joining OCBC Securities, and later DBS Vickers, as managing director. He joined the PSP in 2020, contesting in the West Coast Group Representation Constituency where his team narrowly lost to the PAP. He was appointed an NCMP that same year.

== Early life and education ==
Leong grew up in Chinatown, his family sharing a rented floor of a shophouse with nine other families. He was educated at Raffles Institution in the 1970s, and was later awarded an Overseas Merit Scholarship by the Singapore Government in 1979 to study economics at Hitotsubashi University in Japan, where he graduated valedictorian and at the top of his economics class. Whilst pursuing his degree, Leong was also elected Secretary-General of Singapore's Student Association of Japan. In 1992, Leong obtained a Master of Science in management from London Business School as a Sloan Fellow. He is a Chartered Financial Analyst.

== Career ==
Leong began his career in 1986 with the GIC, Singapore's sovereign wealth fund, and subsequently worked with investment banks in Tokyo, London and Hong Kong, including at Mitsubishi Bank, Salomon Brothers and at Merrill Lynch as a director. He returned to Singapore in 1997 to accept an appointment as managing director of OCBC Securities. He stepped down from the position in 2005, joining DBS Vickers as managing director later that year. He is currently the chief executive officer of his own private equity firm, Timbre Capital.

Leong was formerly the deputy chairman of the Singapore Exchange Disciplinary Panel.

=== Political career ===
Leong joined PSP in 2019 and served as its assistant secretary-general.

In the 2020 Singaporean general election, Leong along with team members, Tan Cheng Bock, Hazel Poa, Nadarajah Loganathan and Jeffrey Khoo contested in the West Coast GRC as part of a five-member PSP team but narrowly lost to the People's Action Party with 48.31% of the vote. Notwithstanding, under the Non-constituency Member of Parliament (NCMP) scheme, Leong was appointed an NCMP with effect from 16 July 2020. Four days later, he stepped down as assistant secretary-general of PSP to focus on his NCMP duties, with the position handed over to Francis Yuen.

In 2023, Yuen stepped down as secretary-general of PSP and Leong was elected secretary-general. On 23 February 2024, Leong stepped down as secretary-general of PSP after the Singapore government issued a POFMA order which refuted the falsehoods made by Leong on his Facebook post. He remains on the party's governing body and as an NCMP.

Leong was re-elected as secretary-general of the Progress Singapore Party on 26 March 2025.

=== Parliamentary work ===
In 2021, Minister for Foreign Affairs Vivian Balakrishnan called Leong "illiterate" in Parliament in a hot mic accident, denigrating Leong's secondary school Raffles Institution as a "lousy school". Balakrishnan later apologised to Leong for the remark. In August 2023, Leong filed a complaint against Balakrishnan, which Speaker of Parliament Seah Kian Peng dismissed.

In 2023, MP for Bukit Batok SMC Murali Pillai claimed in Parliament that Leong had “advocated some form of rent control” during a debate on the Significant Investments Review Bill. Leong similarly filed a complaint to the Speaker of Parliament against this claim, which was also dismissed.

In 2023, Parliament voted in favour of an amended motion Leong proposed on the impartiality of duties of the Speaker of Parliament. The same year, Leong's motion on housing policy was supported by all 11 opposition Members of Parliament, but failed to win the majority PAP's vote.

Eugene Tan, an associate professor at Singapore Management University, has described Leong as having a "dogged but confrontational style" in Parliament with a "folksy persona" that attempts to embody a "defiant underdog speaking for the masses". Felix Tan, a lecturer at Nanyang Technological University, notes that "A vocal articulation of [Leong's] thoughts in parliament has given him... perhaps an increasing number of supporters for the way that he goes about voicing concerns amongst certain groups of Singaporeans."

== Political positions ==
Leong argues that Singaporeans at large are worried about domestic jobs being replaced by expatriates, advocating for laws that prevent discrimination on the basis of nationality. In 2020, Leong proposed a cap on the ratio of non-resident workers to Singapore citizens, and for more stringent regulations on the admission of foreign PMETs. In 2021, Leong criticised the government for the India–Singapore Comprehensive Economic Cooperation Agreement, claiming that the policy had negatively affected Singaporean employment whilst increasing immigration into Singapore.

Leong has criticised the government's social policy as giving out handouts. He advocates for long-term social policy solutions and for a minimum wage in Singapore. In light of rising costs of living, Leong has proposed re-lowering Singapore's goods and service tax from 9% to 7%, after it was increased by the government. At the 2023 budget debates, Leong expressed the view that middle-class Singaporeans are taxed disproportionately to their income. He advocates for more affordable public housing in Singapore.

Leong has been vocal in raising questions relating to the reserves of the Government of Singapore. In February 2024, he raised a motion calling on the Government to use more of the reserves for the needs of the current generation of Singaporeans. During that debate, he argued that there was no need for secrecy around the size of Singapore's reserves, and that the reserves will continue to grow even if a larger proportion is allocated for use today.

Leong has also raised questions about the Selective En Bloc Redevelopment Scheme (SERS). In 2022, he submitted a petition to Parliament seeking a review of the scheme and a moratorium on the scheme pending the outcome of such a review, on behalf of residents affected by the scheme.

He has called for the abolition of the GRC system, financial support for opposition MPs, and for greater opposition representation in Parliament. He opposed the government's passing of the Foreign Interference (Countermeasures) Act, arguing that more public consultation and legislative checks should have been put into place. During the COVID-19 pandemic, Leong voted against the government's bill to allow the use of TraceTogether contact tracing information by law enforcement officials in investigations.

The PSP supported a motion passed by the Parliament of Singapore on the Gaza war in November 2023. During that debate, Leong acknowledged the complexity of the Israeli–Palestinian conflict and called for greater public education on this issue to reduce the risk of Singaporeans being swayed by biased or incorrect discourse.

== Personal life ==
Leong has three children.

== Notes ==
Parliament of Singapore
Preceded by Daniel Goh; Dennis Tan; Leon Perera	Non-Constituency Member of Parliament; 2020 - 2025; Served alongside: Hazel Poa	Succeeded by Andre Low; Eileen Chong
