= Jalan Kayu Single Member Constituency =

Electoral division in Singapore

Jalan Kayu
- Single-member constituency for the Parliament of Singapore
- Region: North-East Region, Singapore
- Electorate: 29,628

Current constituency
- Created: 2025; 1 year ago
- Seats: 1
- Party: People's Action Party
- Member: Ng Chee Meng
- Town Council: Jalan Kayu
- Created from: Ang Mo Kio GRC

The Jalan Kayu Single Member Constituency (Note: Malay: Kawasan Undi Perseorangan Jalan Kayu; Chinese: 惹兰加由单选区; Tamil: ஜாலான் காயு தனித்தொகுதி) is a single-member constituency (SMC) situated in north-eastern Singapore. It is managed by Jalan Kayu Town Council (JKTC). The current Member of Parliament (MP) for the constituency is Minister in the Prime Minister's Office Ng Chee Meng from the People's Action Party (PAP).

== History ==
Prior to the 2025 general election, Jalan Kayu SMC was established to reduce the number of voters in Ang Mo Kio Group Representation Constituency (GRC), the GRC with the largest electorate. At establishment, the SMC had 29,565 registered voters.

The PAP announced that Ng would contest the newly established SMC. He had previously been a cabinet minister and MP for Pasir Ris–Punggol GRC but was defeated by the Workers' Party (WP) when running for Sengkang GRC in 2020. The WP announced Andre Low as their candidate for the constituency on Nomination Day, after two other opposition parties pulled out. Ng defeated Low by 2.94% of the vote, or 809 votes, the narrowest PAP victory in the election. As the best-performing defeated opposition candidate, Low was offered, and accepted, a seat as a non-constituency MP (NCMP).

After the election, it was announced that Jalan Kayu SMC would have its own town council, a situation last seen in 2011 with Potong Pasir SMC.

== Members of Parliament ==
Interactive map of Jalan Kayu SMC as of the 2025 general election

Year	Member	Party
Formation
2025	Ng Chee Meng	PAP

== Electoral results ==
Note: The Elections Department does not include rejected votes when calculating the vote shares of candidates. Hence, all candidates' vote shares will total to 100% at any given election (may not appear so in multi-way contests due to rounding).

=== Elections in 2020s ===
General Election 2025
Party	Candidate	Votes	%
PAP	Ng Chee Meng	14,146	51.47
WP	Andre Low	13,337	48.53
Majority		809	2.94
Total valid votes		27,483	98.65
Rejected ballots		377	1.35
Turnout		27,860	94.03
Registered electors		29,628	
PAP win (new seat)			
