= Gerald Giam =

Singaporean politician (born 1977)

The Honourable Gerald Giam
- 严燕松
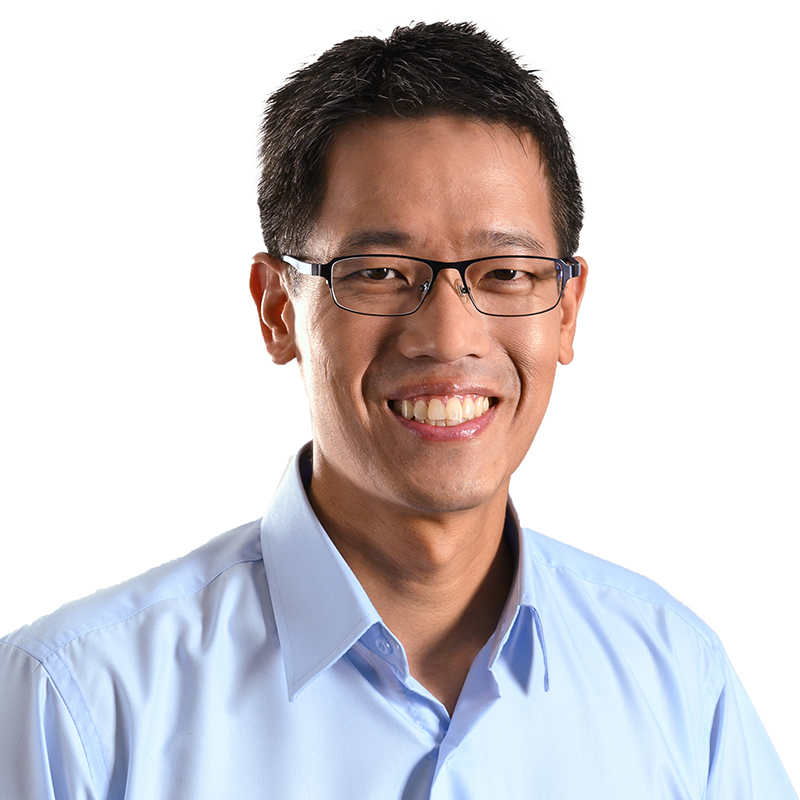
- Official portrait, 2021

Member of the Singapore Parliament for Aljunied GRC
- Incumbent
- Assumed office 10 July 2020
- Preceded by: WP held
- Majority: 2020: 28,485 (19.90%); 2025: 25,783 (19.42%)

Deputy Head of Policy Research Team of the Workers' Party
- Incumbent
- Assumed office 7 July 2026
- Preceded by: Jamus Lim

Non-Constituency Member of the 12th Parliament of Singapore
- In office 10 October 2011 – 25 August 2015 Serving with Yee Jenn Jong
- Preceded by: Sylvia Lim
- Succeeded by: Daniel Goh; Dennis Tan; Leon Perera

Personal details
- Born: Gerald Giam Yean Song; 22 November 1977 (age 48) United Kingdom
- Party: Workers' Party
- Children: 2
- Education: University of Southern California (BS); Nanyang Technological University (MS)
- Occupation: Politician

Gerald Giam Yean Song (Note: Chinese: 严燕松; Pe̍h-ōe-jī: Giâm Iàn-sông) (born 22 November 1977) is a Singaporean politician. A member of the Workers' Party (WP), Giam has been the Non-Constituency Member of Parliament (NCMP) between 2011 and 2015. He has been the Member of Parliament (MP) for the Bedok Reservoir–Punggol division of Aljunied Group Representation Constituency (GRC) since 2020.

== Education ==
Giam was educated at Anglo-Chinese School (Independent) and Anglo-Chinese Junior College. He holds a Bachelor of Science in electrical engineering from the University of Southern California and a Master of Science in international political economy from Nanyang Technological University.

== Career ==
Giam has worked in various roles in the information technology industry, including as a senior consultant at Avanade and a project manager at MSC Consulting. He was also a foreign service officer at the Ministry of Foreign Affairs and a volunteer youth leader in the South West Community Development Council (CDC). He was previously a deputy editor at The Online Citizen (TOC).

Giam is the chief technology officer of an information technology solutions company which he co-founded. He is a Registered Management Consultant certified by the Institute of Management Consultants (Singapore).

=== Political career ===
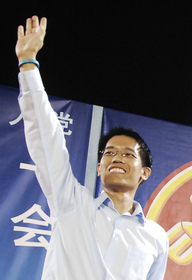
Giam at a political rally in 2011

Following the 2011 general election, Giam first entered politics in a five-member Workers' Party with team members, Png Eng Huat, Mohd Fazli Talip, Eric Tan and Glenda Han contesting in the East Coast GRC against the People's Action Party (PAP). The Workers' Party team lost with 45.2% of the votes.

As the best performing defeated team, Giam was offered a Non-constituency Member of Parliament (NCMP) seat in Parliament. On 13 May 2011, the Workers' Party confirmed that Giam would take up the NCMP seat.

With Giam taking up the NCMP position together with Yee Jenn Jong, the Workers' Party set a new record in Singapore's electoral history by becoming the first opposition party to have eight (six elected and two NCMP) seats in Parliament.

Giam served as a NCMP in the 12th Parliament from 10 October 2011 to 25 August 2015.

During the 2015 general election, Giam contested in East Coast GRC alongside, Daniel Goh, Leon Perera and Mohamed Fairoz Bin Shariff going against the People's Action Party (PAP) team. The Workers' Party team lost with 39.27% of the votes.

As the opposition team with third highest percentage of votes among losing candidates, Giam's team was offered one NCMP seat which the team decided to let Perera to take up the seat. After Lee Li Lian, another WP member who had unsuccessfully run for reelection in Punggol East Single Member Constituency (SMC), refused the NCMP seat offered to her, Lee's seat was offered to another member of Giam's team which was decided that Goh was to take up the last NCMP seat.

During the 2020 general election, Giam was in a five-member WP team and contested in Aljunied GRC with Pritam Singh, Sylvia Lim, Leon Perera and Muhamad Faisal Manap and won the GRC with 59.95% of the votes. Giam was elected as Member of Parliament representing Aljunied GRC in the 14th Parliament.

Giam has served as the Chairman of the Aljunied-Hougang Town Council (AHTC) since 2024 and previously serving as its Vice-Chairman from 2020 to 2024. Giam was elected as Head, Policy Research of the Workers' Party Central Executive Committee since 2022 to 2026. He was elected as Deputy Head, Policy Research of the Workers' Party Central Executive Committee since 2026.

During the 2025 general election, Giam was in a five-member WP team and contested in Aljunied GRC with Pritam Singh, Sylvia Lim, Kenneth Tiong and Fadli Fawzi and won the GRC with 59.71% of the votes. Giam was elected as Member of Parliament representing Aljunied GRC in the 15th Parliament.

== Political positions ==
=== National Service ===
Giam has repeatedly pressed for higher pay for full-time national servicemen (NSFs). In February 2023 he asked in Parliament whether NSF allowances could be raised to keep pace with inflation, to which Senior Minister of State for Defence Heng Chee How replied that NSFs' lodging and food were already provided for; from 1 July 2023, monthly NSF allowances rose by between S$125 and S$200, or 10.9 to 21.7 per cent. At the 2024 Ministry of Defence Committee of Supply debate, he proposed reframing NS pay from an "allowance" to a "salary" attracting Central Provident Fund contributions, set at a median of at least the local qualifying salary of S$1,600 a month, arguing that second-year NSFs performed fully operational roles. Heng rejected the reframing, saying national service "is a duty to the country, it's not a form of employment". At the 2025 debate Giam renewed the call and also urged smoother transitions from NSFs' end of service to university and more career-relevant training; the government maintained its position on the allowance but announced a further S$35–S$75 increase in monthly NSF allowances from 1 July 2025, the fourth such adjustment in a decade.

=== Artificial intelligence ===
In February 2024, Giam delivered an adjournment motion titled "Global Leadership in AI", arguing that Singapore's National AI Strategy should be complemented by a more proactive AI industrial policy and proposing publicly funded "moonshot" projects, with healthcare AI built on population-scale clinical datasets as a candidate. In 2025, the Ministry of Health established the Singapore Medical Foundation AI Model (SIMFONI) programme to develop healthcare AI foundation models, which from June 2026 was trained on the National Supercomputing Centre Aspire 2B supercomputer.

== Personal life ==
Giam is of Peranakan Chinese ancestry and is a Christian. He is married to a chartered accountant with two children.

== Notes ==
Parliament of Singapore
Preceded by Sylvia Lim	Non-Constituency Member of Parliament; 2016–2020; Served alongside: Yee Jenn Jong, Lina Chiam	Succeeded by Dennis Tan; Daniel Goh; Leon Perera
Preceded by Low Thia Khiang; Sylvia Lim; Faisal Manap; Pritam Singh; Chen Show Mao	Member of Parliament for Aljunied GRC; 2020–present Served alongside: (2020 - 2025): Pritam Singh, Sylvia Lim, Faisal Manap, Leon Perera (2025 - present): Pritam Singh, Sylvia Lim, Kenneth Tiong, Fadli Fawzi	Incumbent
