= Pre-election day events of the 2020 Singaporean general election =

List of notable events prior to the 2020 Singaporean general election

List of notable events prior to the 2020 Singaporean general election:

== New candidates/Outgoing MPs ==
=== New candidates ===
The following is a list of candidates contesting in the election for the first time. There are 73 new candidates.

Candidates running as independents do not have a party logo but have a different logo reflected in the party column.

Name	Age	Occupation	Party	Contested Constituency
Williamson Lee Jian Chuan	40	Company vice-chairman	Singapore People's Party	Bishan–Toa Payoh GRC
Jose Raymond Thomas Devaraj	49	Chief Strategy Officer, SW Singapore	Singapore People's Party	Potong Pasir SMC
Desmond Tan Kok Ming	50	Former chief executive, People's Association	People's Action Party	Pasir Ris–Punggol GRC
Edward Chia Bing Hui	36	Co-founder, Timbre Group	People's Action Party	Holland–Bukit Timah GRC
Nadia Ahmad Samdin	30	Associate director, TSMP Law Corporation	People's Action Party	Ang Mo Kio GRC
Hany Soh Hui Bin	33	Lawyer and Director, MSC Law Corporation	People's Action Party	Marsiling–Yew Tee GRC
Don Wee Boon Hong	43	Senior vice-president, United Overseas Bank	People's Action Party	Chua Chu Kang GRC
Fahmi Aliman	48	Deputy chief executive, Islamic Religious Council of Singapore, and director, NTUC Administration and Research Unit	People's Action Party	Marine Parade GRC
Yip Hon Weng	43	Former group chief, Silver Generation Office at the Agency for Integrated Care	People's Action Party	Yio Chu Kang SMC
Tan Kiat How	42	Former IMDA chief executive and Founder, Silver Generation Office	People's Action Party	East Coast GRC
Tan See Leng	55	Former managing director and chief executive officer, IHH Healthcare	People's Action Party	Marine Parade GRC
Zhulkarnain Abdul Rahim	39	Law firm, Dentons Rodyk & Davidson	People's Action Party	Chua Chu Kang GRC
Ng Ling Ling	48	Former director, Ministry of Health's Office for Healthcare Transformation (community engagement)	People's Action Party	Ang Mo Kio GRC
Derrick Goh Soon Hee	51	Head Managing Director, Group Audit at DBS Bank	People's Action Party	Nee Soon GRC
Poh Li San	45	Vice-President, Terminal 5 Planning of Changi East Development, Changi Airport Group	People's Action Party	Sembawang GRC
Yeo Wan Ling	44	Founder, Caregiver Group and Caregiver Asia	People's Action Party	Pasir Ris–Punggol GRC
Alvin Tan Sheng Hui	39	Industrial planner and head, LinkedIn	People's Action Party	Tanjong Pagar GRC
Wan Rizal Bin Wan Zakariah	42	Senior Lecturer, Republic Polytechnic (Sports & Exercise Science at the School of Sports)	People's Action Party	Jalan Besar GRC
Eric Chua Swee Leong	41	Former company chairman and Commander of the 3rd SCDF Division	People's Action Party	Tanjong Pagar GRC
Gan Siow Huang	46	Former air force brigadier-general and deputy CEO, National Trades Union Congress' Employment and Employability Institute	People's Action Party	Marymount SMC
Rachel Ong Sin Yen	47	Chief executive, Rohei	People's Action Party	West Coast GRC
Mohamed Sharael Taha	39	Vice-president, Singapore Aero Engine Services (strategy and project management office)	People's Action Party	Pasir Ris–Punggol GRC
Alex Yeo Sheng Chye	41	Lawyer and Director, Niru & Co LLC	People's Action Party	Aljunied GRC
Raymond Lye Hoong Yip	54	Managing Partner, Union Law LLP	People's Action Party	Sengkang GRC
Mariam Jaafar	43	Managing director, Boston Consulting Group	People's Action Party	Sembawang GRC
Shawn Huang Wei Zhong	38	Director, Enterprise Development Group at Temasek Holdings	People's Action Party	Jurong GRC
Xie Yao Quan	35	Head of healthcare redesign, Alexandra Hospital, maternal cousin of Ong Ye Kung	People's Action Party	Jurong GRC
Carrie Tan Huimin	38	Founder, Daughters of Tomorrow	People's Action Party	Nee Soon GRC
Chan Hui Yuh	44	MRT train announcer (except North East and Downtown Lines) and Marketing director, Jingslink Marketing	People's Action Party	Aljunied GRC
Nadarajah Loganathan	57	Adult educator and former SAF Lieutenant Colonel	Progress Singapore Party	West Coast GRC
Wendy Low Wei Ling	43	Lawyer, Eldan Law LLP	Progress Singapore Party	Tanjong Pagar GRC
Kumaran Masilamani Pillai	49	CEO, Apple Seed	Progress Singapore Party	Kebun Baru SMC
Damien Tay Chye Seng	51	Customer service manager	Progress Singapore Party	Nee Soon GRC
Michael Chua Teck Leong	55	Business director and former Senior Lieutenant-Colonel	Progress Singapore Party	Tanjong Pagar GRC
Lim Cher Hong	42	Author and chartered financial consultant, CHFC	Progress Singapore Party	Pioneer SMC
Leong Mun Wai	60	Founder, Timbre Capita	Progress Singapore Party	West Coast GRC
Terence Soon Jun Wei	29	Pilot, Singapore Airlines	Progress Singapore Party	Tanjong Pagar GRC
Kalayarasu Manickam	52	Adult educator and former platoon commander	Progress Singapore Party	Nee Soon GRC
Jeffrey Khoo Poh Tiong	51	Chief marketing officer, APAC	Progress Singapore Party	West Coast GRC
Abdul Rahman Mohamad	67	Consulting engineer, Institution of Fire Engineers UK	Progress Singapore Party	Chua Chu Kang GRC
Tan Meng Wah	56	Associate professor, Lee Kuan Yew School of Public Policy	Progress Singapore Party	Chua Chu Kang GRC
Choo Shaun Ming	23	Undergraduate, National University of Singapore	Progress Singapore Party	Chua Chu Kang GRC
Harish Pillay	60	Director, Red Hat	Progress Singapore Party	Tanjong Pagar GRC
A'bas Kasmani	67	Senior trainer	Progress Singapore Party	Tanjong Pagar GRC
Kayla Low Shu Yu	43	Chartered accountant	Progress Singapore Party	Yio Chu Kang SMC
Francis Yuen Kin Pheng	67	Former SAF Lieutenant Colonel and Director, Huarui Aerosystems	Progress Singapore Party	Chua Chu Kang GRC
Sri Nallakaruppan	56	IT professional and investment specialist	Progress Singapore Party	Nee Soon GRC
Bradley Peter Bowyer	53	Media consultant	Progress Singapore Party	Nee Soon GRC
Taufik Supan	40	IT project manager	Progress Singapore Party	Nee Soon GRC
Gigene Wong Sang Thor	54	Senior manager	Progress Singapore Party	Hong Kah North SMC
Alfred Tan Wei Ru	54	Director, Kopi Ong	Singapore Democratic Party	Holland–Bukit Timah GRC
En-Min Cheong	35	Marketing and communications professional	Singapore Democratic Party	Holland–Bukit Timah GRC
Robin Low Boon Peng	45	Entrepreneur, Industrial & Services Co-Operative Society Ltd (ISCOS)	Singapore Democratic Party	Yuhua SMC
Liyana Dhamirah Selamat	33	Business Operations Specialist, Catalyse Consulting	Red Dot United	Jurong GRC
Nicholas Tang Jian Ye	28	Legal engineer, Pinsent Masons MPillay LLP	Red Dot United	Jurong GRC
Charles Yeo Yao Hui	30	Criminal defence lawyer	Reform Party	Ang Mo Kio GRC
Raeesah Begum Farid Khan	26	Activist and founder, Reyna Movement	Workers' Party	Sengkang GRC
Jamus Jerome Lim Chee Wui	44	Associate professor of economics, ESSEC Business School, Asia-Pacific	Workers' Party	Sengkang GRC
Louis Chua Kheng Wee	33	Equity Research Analyst, Credit Suisse	Workers' Party	Sengkang GRC
Muhammad Azhar Abdul Latip	34	Gig economy worker and Grab driver	Workers' Party	Marine Parade GRC
Nathaniel Koh Kim Kui	36	IT professional	Workers' Party	Marine Parade GRC
Tan Chen Chen	38	Contracts administrator	Workers' Party	Punggol West SMC
Muhammad Fadli Mohammed Fawzi	45	Lawyer, Inkwell Law Corporation	Workers' Party	Marine Parade GRC
Abdul Shariff Aboo Kassim	54	Former researcher	Workers' Party	East Coast GRC
Sivakumaran Chellappa	57	Educator	Peoples Voice	Mountbatten SMC
Azlan Sulaiman	49	Certifier, Majlis Ugama Islam Singapura (MUIS)	Peoples Voice	Jalan Besar GRC
Michael Fang Amin	43	Medical administrator and entrepreneur	Peoples Voice	Jalan Besar GRC
Leong Sze Hian	66	Blogger and financial adviser	Peoples Voice	Jalan Besar GRC
Mohamed Nassir Ismail	63	Freelance economics lecturer	Peoples Voice	Pasir Ris–Punggol GRC
Prabu Ramachandran	31	Business financial manager	Peoples Voice	Pasir Ris–Punggol GRC
Simon Jireh Lim Kay Cheow	61	Private-hire driver	Peoples Voice	Pasir Ris–Punggol GRC
Kelvin Ong Soon Huat	34	Operation Manager	Singapore Democratic Alliance	Pasir Ris–Punggol GRC
Kuswadi Atnawi	57	Electrical engineer	Singapore Democratic Alliance	Pasir Ris–Punggol GRC
Cheang Peng Wah	62	Business consultant	Independent	Pioneer SMC

=== Outgoing Members of Parliament ===
The following members of parliament (MPs) retired and did not seek re-election this time.

Name	Constituency (Division)	Party	Highest attained portfolio during the 13th Parliament of Singapore	Date announced	Remarks
Yaacob Ibrahim	Jalan Besar GRC (Kolam Ayer)	People's Action Party	Former Cabinet Minister (Communications and Information/Minister-in-charge of Muslim Affairs and Cyber Security)	23 June 2020	
Goh Chok Tong	Marine Parade GRC (Marine Parade)	People's Action Party	Emeritus Senior Minister	25 June 2020	Secretary-General for the party (1992–2004) & second Prime Minister (1990-2004)
Low Thia Khiang	Aljunied GRC (Bedok Reservoir-Punggol)	Workers' Party	Member of Parliament/Former Leader of the Opposition	25 June 2020	Secretary-General for the party (2001–18)
Chen Show Mao	Aljunied GRC (Paya Lebar)	Workers' Party	Member of Parliament	25 June 2020	
Png Eng Huat	Hougang SMC	Workers' Party	Member of Parliament	25 June 2020	
Khaw Boon Wan	Sembawang GRC (Sembawang)	People's Action Party	Coordinating Minister for Infrastructure and Minister for Transport	26 June 2020	
Charles Chong	Punggol East SMC	People's Action Party	Deputy Speaker	27 June 2020	Chong's ward was absorbed into Sengkang GRC.
Ong Teng Koon	Marsiling–Yew Tee GRC (Woodgrove)	People's Action Party	Member of Parliament	28 June 2020	
Sam Tan	Radin Mas SMC	People's Action Party	Minister of State (Foreign Affairs/Social and Family Development)	29 June 2020	
Chia Shi-Lu	Tanjong Pagar GRC (Queenstown)	People's Action Party	Member of Parliament	29 June 2020	
Lily Neo	Jalan Besar GRC (Kreta Ayer - Kim Seng)	People's Action Party	Member of Parliament	29 June 2020	
Lee Bee Wah	Nee Soon GRC (Nee Soon South)	People's Action Party	Member of Parliament	29 June 2020	
Fatimah Lateef	Marine Parade GRC (Geylang Serai)	People's Action Party	Member of Parliament	30 June 2020	
Zainal Sapari	Pasir Ris–Punggol GRC (Pasir Ris East)	People's Action Party	Member of Parliament	30 June 2020	
Lim Hng Kiang	West Coast GRC (Telok Blangah)	People's Action Party	Former Cabinet Minister (Trade and Industry)	30 June 2020	
Lee Yi Shyan	East Coast GRC (Kampong Chai Chee)	People's Action Party	Member of Parliament	30 June 2020	
Lim Swee Say	East Coast GRC (Bedok)	People's Action Party	Former Cabinet Minister (Manpower)	30 June 2020	
Teo Ho Pin	Bukit Panjang SMC	People's Action Party	Mayor (North West CDC)	30 June 2020	
Teo Ser Luck	Pasir Ris–Punggol GRC (Sengkang Central)	People's Action Party	Former Mayor (North East CDC) and Minister of State (Manpower/Trade & Industry)	30 June 2020	Teo's ward was absorbed into Sengkang GRC.
Cedric Foo	Pioneer SMC	People's Action Party	Member of Parliament	30 June 2020	
Intan Azura Mokhtar	Ang Mo Kio GRC (Jalan Kayu)	People's Action Party	Member of Parliament	30 June 2020	
Ang Hin Kee	Ang Mo Kio GRC (Cheng San-Seletar)	People's Action Party	Member of Parliament	30 June 2020	
Yee Chia Hsing	Chua Chu Kang GRC (Nanyang)	People's Action Party	Member of Parliament	30 June 2020	Portions of Yee's ward are absorbed into neighboring Hong Kah North SMC and West Coast GRC.

=== Party changes ===
During the period in the lead-up to the election, multiple opposition politicians changed their party affiliation for the purpose of contesting this election. The following table lists these politicians, excluding politicians whose parties joined alliances.

Name	Previous party	New party	Remarks	Constituency	Source
Ang Yong Guan	SingFirst	PSP	Ang, also a former member of the Singapore Democratic Party in the 2011 election, joined PSP sometime in 2019, while his former party, Singaporeans First, was dissolved on 25 June 2020.	Marymount SMC	
Tan Jee Say	SingFirst	SDP	Tan, a former Singapore Democratic Party member and also a 2011 presidential candidate, was the founder of the Singaporeans First party on 25 May 2014. After the party was dissolved on 25 June 2020, he returned back to SDP.	Holland-Bukit Timah GRC	
Hazel Poa	NSP	PSP	Poa first contested in the 2011 elections under the NSP ticket in the Chua Chu Kang GRC. Ahead in the last election, Poa, then the NSP's assistant secretary-general, resigned from the party on 19 August 2015 in protest to NSP for their decision to contest MacPherson SMC. She joined PSP sometime in July 2019.	West Coast GRC	
Nicole Seah	NSP	WP	Seah first contested in the 2011 elections under the NSP ticket in the Marine Parade GRC. She resigned from NSP in 2014 and later joined the WP in late 2015, sometime after the end of that year's election.	East Coast GRC	
Lim Tean	NSP	PV	Lim was the secretary-general for NSP and led his team in Tampines GRC in 2015. Lim left NSP on 18 May 2017 over party's disagreements, and founded Peoples Voice on 29 October 2018.	Jalan Besar GRC	
Tan Cheng Bock	PAP	PSP	Tan, a former six-term MP of Ayer Rajah SMC from 1980 to 2006, and a 2011 presidential candidate, founded Progress Singapore Party on 28 March 2019.	West Coast GRC	
Ravi Philemon	SPP	RDU	Philemon was a candidate in the 2015 election contesting Hong Kah North SMC. Philemon left SPP sometime after the election to join PSP in 2019, but in May 2020, he left PSP and founded Red Dot United on 26 May.	Jurong GRC	
Steve Chia	NSP	SPP	Chia, a former Non-constituency Member of Parliament from 2001 to 2006, was a member of the NSP. He did not contest in the 2015 election following online outcry of NSP contesting MacPherson SMC and their party to initially field him as a candidate, which was later passed it to Cheo Chai Chen. Chia left NSP and joined SPP, then subsequently become the party's secretary-general on 5 November 2019, succeeding Chiam See Tong.	Bishan-Toa Payoh GRC	

== Pre-nomination day ==
The following is a list of events that occurred prior to Nomination Day on 30 June 2020. All times are reflected in Singapore Standard Time (SGT).

- PAP – People's Action Party
- DPP – Democratic Progressive Party
- NSP – National Solidarity Party
- PSP – Progress Singapore Party
- PV – Peoples Voice
- RDU – Red Dot United
- RP – Reform Party
- SDA – Singapore Democratic Alliance
- SDP – Singapore Democratic Party
- SingFirst – Singaporeans First
- SPP – Singapore People's Party
- WP – Workers' Party

Date	Party	Events	Source
1 March		The Registers of Electors revised eligible candidates with a cut-off date of 1 March. The certification was enacted on 15 April.	
13 March		The Electoral Boundaries Review Committee published a report on new electoral boundaries.	
21 April	WP	WP announced that NCMP Daniel Goh will be stepping down from its central executive committee (CEC) for health reasons, and not be running in the next General Election.	
30 April	WP	Aljunied GRC incumbent Low Thia Khiang was warded to the Khoo Teck Puat Hospital's ICU ward following a head injury, and the party informed on the hospitalization three days later on 3 May. Low was transferred to a general ward on 4 May, and eventually discharged on 21 May.	
26 May	RDU	Former Progress Singapore Party members Ravi Philemon and Michelle Lee founded Red Dot United. Its party was approved three weeks later on 15 June.	
13 June	PSP	PSP announced that it will contest with 29 candidates at the election as opposed to 44 earlier, coming after talks with other opposition parties. It also announced that the West Coast GRC candidates are almost confirmed.	
15 June	RP	RP unveiled a batch of seven candidates: Kenneth Jeyaretnam, Andy Zhu, Noraini Yunus and Darren Soh, as well as first-time candidates Charles Yeo, Mahaboob Batcha and Gurdev Singh.	
18 June		The Elections Department Singapore released preliminary campaigning guidelines pertaining to campaigning and social distancing amid the ongoing COVID-19 pandemic, just a day before Singapore enters the second phase of reopening.	
18 June	PSP	PSP unveiled its first batch of six candidates: Francis Yuen Khin Pheng, Muhammad Taufik Supan, Sri Nallakaruppan, Brad Bowyer, Gigene Wong and Hazel Poa.	
20 June	SPP	SPP unveiled its candidates for two constituencies: Bishan–Toa Payoh GRC: Steve Chia, Williiamson Lee, Osman Sulaiman and Melvyn Chiu; Potong Pasir SMC: Jose Raymond	
21 June	SDP	SDP secretary-general Chee Soon Juan announced his candidacy for Bukit Batok SMC, which he had previously contested in the 2016 by-election.	
23 June		At 4 pm, Prime Minister Lee Hsien Loong held a televised announcement highlighting future challenges facing Singapore and the relative stability of the COVID-19 situation, then announced the dissolution of the 13th Parliament of Singapore; President Halimah Yacob dissolved the parliament and the writ of election is published. Returning officer Tan Meng Dui adjourned nominations to be held 30 June, and Singapore would go to the polls on 10 July.	
23 June	PAP	Yaacob Ibrahim, Member of Parliament of Jalan Besar GRC, announced his retirement.	
23 June	PSP	PSP leader Tan Cheng Bock announced plans to contest eight constituencies: West Coast GRC, Choa Chu Kang GRC, Tanjong Pagar GRC, Hong Kah North, Marymount, Pioneer, Yio Chu Kang, and Kebun Baru, as well as trim the list to 24 candidates. The party's also unveiled a second batch of candidates: Tan Meng Wah, Kayla Low, A’bas Bin Kasmani, Choo Shaun Ming, Harish Pillay and former Singaporeans First candidate Ang Yong Guan.	
23 June	WP	WP released a video with a slogan, "Make Your Vote Count", featuring 12 faces of the party, including leader Pritam Singh, chairperson Sylvia Lim, NCMP Dennis Tan, former Punggol East SMC MP Lee Li Lian and former NSP member Nicole Seah.	
23 June	RDU	RDU unveiled the first three candidates: Ravi Philemon, Michelle Lee Juan, and Liyana Dhamirah. They also announced that they will be fielded only in Jurong GRC, and were prepared to pass the contest to PV to avoid a possible multi-cornered contest.	
23 June	PPP	PPP secretary-general Goh Meng Seng announced that the party will be contesting MacPherson SMC and Radin Mas SMC.	
24 June	RP	RP leader Kenneth Jeyaretnam announced they will withdraw from West Coast GRC to facilitate opposition unity even though the team had contested there in 2011 and 2015, avoiding a potential three-cornered fight with the PAP and PSP. It will now only contest in Radin Mas SMC, Yio Chu Kang SMC and Ang Mo Kio GRC, allowing a three-cornered contest for Yio Chu Kang.	
24 June	PSP	PSP unveiled Lee Hsien Yang, younger brother of Lee Hsien Loong and also the younger son of Lee Kuan Yew, as a party member. The younger Lee is considering contesting the election.	
24 June	PAP	PAP announced that there will be 26 new candidates this election which will be unveiled over the next few days, but declined to reveal where the candidates would be standing. The first two groups of four new candidates were announced as: Desmond Tan Kok Ming, Edward Chia Bing Hui, Ivan Lim Shaw Chuan and Nadia Ahmad Samdin; Don Wee Boon Hong, Hany Soh Hui Bin, Mohd Fahmi Aliman and Yip Hon Weng	
24 June	PV	PV chief Lim Tean announced that the party will be contesting Punggol West SMC and Pasir Ris–Punggol GRC, anticipating a three-cornered contest for the latter.	
24 June	SDP	SDP announced that the party will be contesting Holland–Bukit Timah GRC, Marsiling–Yew Tee GRC, Bukit Panjang SMC and Yuhua SMC.	
24 June	NSP	NSP secretary-general Spencer Ng announced that the party will be contesting Tampines GRC and Sembawang GRC and withdrawing from Pioneer SMC to back PSP.	
24 June	RDU	RDU unveiled its fourth candidate for Jurong GRC: Nicholas Tang Jian Ye	
25 June	PV	PV announced its intention to contest Jalan Besar GRC, Mountbatten SMC, Pasir-Ris Punggol GRC, Pioneer SMC and Punggol West SMC.	
25 June	PAP	PAP unveiled three more batches of new candidates, respectively introduced by Heng, Masagos Zulkifli and Grace Fu: Ng Ling Ling, Tan Kiat How, Tan See Leng and Zhulkarnain Abdul Rahim; Yeo Wan Ling, Alvin Tan Sheng Hui, Wan Rizal Wan Zakariah and Eric Chua Swee Leong; Derrick Goh Soon Hee, Raymond Lye Hoong Yip and Poh Li San; Emeritus Senior Minister and Marine Parade GRC MP Goh Chok Tong, announced his retirement after serving Marine Parade for 44 years.	
25 June		Perennial candidate Ooi Boon Ewe picked up nomination forms and revealed that he will be standing at Bukit Panjang SMC; if nominated, this would be Ooi's second election since 2001 after unsuccessful nominations in the interim elections, and also the second consecutive election with independent candidates standing.	
25 June	WP	WP announced its intention to contest East Coast GRC, Marine Parade GRC, Sengkang GRC and Punggol West SMC, while defending its current seats in Aljunied GRC and Hougang SMC to be helmed by former NCMPs Gerald Giam and Dennis Tan, respectively. The party also introduced two first-time candidates: Muhammad Azhar Abdul Latip and Louis Chua Kheng Wee as well as two previously-contested candidates Nicole Seah (who contested with NSP in 2011) and Yee Jenn Jong (also a former NCMP). Incumbent MPs Low Thia Khiang, Chen Show Mao and Png Eng Huat will step down as MPs and not contest in the election.	
25 June	SingFirst	Tan Jee Say dissolved Singaporeans First and encouraged its former members to join other opposition parties.	
25 June	PPP	PPP secretary-general Goh Meng Seng announced his candidacy in MacPherson SMC against PAP incumbent Tin Pei Ling, while also withdrawing their interest in contesting Radin Mas SMC and backed RP.	
25 June	PSP	PSP unveiled a batch of five candidates including a former SAF colonel, a former senior lieutenant-colonel and a lawyer: Nadarajah Loganathan, Wendy Low, Kumaran Pillai, Damien Tay Chye Seng and Michael Chua Teck Leong.	
25 June	RP	RP secretary-general Kenneth Jeyaretnam was required to serve a mandatory 14-day stay-home notice at a designated stay-home-notice facility after a visit to the United Kingdom, according to a statement released by the Ministry of Health and the ELD. Jeyaretnam requested for a waiver, but MOH declined his request.	
25 June	SDP	SDP held an "Ask Me Anything" session on Reddit, where Reddit users were able to ask the SDP questions about its views pertaining to the upcoming election.	
26 June	PAP	PAP vice-chairman Masagos Zulkifli and Chan Chun Sing unveiled its final batch of new candidates at separate sessions, including the first woman brigadier-general: Gan Siow Huang, Rachel Ong Sin Yen, Mohamed Sharael Taha and Alex Yeo Sheng Chye; Mariam Jaafar, Shawn Huang Wei Zhong (née Inkiriwang), Chan Hui Yuh and Carrie Tan Huimin; Chan was an intended PAP candidate in the last General election, but ultimately did not participate and was replaced by former MP Yeo Guat Kwang.; Transport Minister and Sembawang GRC MP Khaw Boon Wan announced his retirement.	
26 June	RDU	RDU announced its final candidate for Jurong GRC, ex-SDP candidate Alec Tok Kim Yam, thus completing the five-member lineup that earlier include Ravi Philemon, Michelle Lee Juan, Liyana Dhamirah and Nicholas Tang Jian Ye.	
26 June	PSP	PSP unveiled its final batch of six new candidates: Lim Cher Hong, Kala Manickam, Leong Mun Wai, Terence Soon Jun Wei, Abdul Rahman Mohamad and Jeffrey Khoo Poh Tiong. Later in the day, the party indicated that they will be contesting in Nee Soon GRC in addition to the initial eight constituencies it was planning to contest in, along with the full lineup for each of them. Lee Hsien Yang is not listed among the candidates for now.	
26 June	WP	WP chairman Sylvia Lim unveiled two first-time candidates: Raeesah Begum Farid Khan and Jamus Jerome Lim Chee Wui, and three previously-contested candidates Dennis Tan Lip Fong, Dylan Ng Foo Eng, and Ron Tan Jun Yen. The party also announced the candidates that they would stand to defend their constituencies, while the other four constituencies will be revealed later only after nomination day: Hougang SMC: Dennis Tan Lip Fong; Aljunied GRC: Incumbents Sylvia Lim, Pritam Singh, Faisal Manap and former NCMPs Gerald Giam and Leon Perera (respectively replacing Low and Chen).	
26 June	PSP; RP	RP chairman Andy Zhu accused PSP of reneging on an agreement to not contest Yio Chu Kang SMC in return for RP withdrawing from West Coast GRC. PSP assistant secretary-general Leong Mun Wai later denied that a deal had been reached and "apologised for any misunderstandings", though it did not make any further concessions.	
27 June		ELD announced that they had received 226 applications for the Political Donation Certificate, 37 applications for the Certificate of The Malay Community Committee and 35 applications for the Certificate of The Indian and Other Minority Communities Committee.	
27 June	PAP	PAP released its manifesto for the upcoming election, as well as its slogan: "Our Lives, Our Jobs, Our Future". The party's secretary-general Lee cited that in a normal election, the party would have focused on long-term plans for the nation; however, because of the ongoing COVID-19 pandemic, their manifesto would instead be about "overcome(ing) this crisis of a generation". PAP also announced that 20 MPs had confirmed their political retirement, among which was deputy speaker and Punggol East SMC MP Charles Chong. PAP's candidate Ivan Lim Shaw Chuan was criticized online as "lacking compassion, and being arrogant and elitist", but Lim later rebutted the criticism saying that "people can have different perspectives of the same incident" and said on an interview that he was "determined to stay the course". Nevertheless, he withdrew from the nomination later that night, with the party accepting his decision.	
27 June	SDP; PAP	After SDP pointed out how the PAP had already erected its flags in Marine Parade GRC, ELD clarified that the rules pertaining to the display of posters and banners during election period did not apply because Nomination Day had not yet passed. A volunteer from the PAP branch office of Marine Parade claimed that the flags were put up "as part of National Day celebrations", and that the erection of its flags had been done annually "for the past 20 to 30 years".	
27 June	PSP	PSP expressed concerns over the requirement to submit its scripts in advance to the Infocomm Media Development Authority and Mediacorp for the preparation of subtitles for political broadcasts on TV; organising secretary Michael Chua Teck Leong said that the submission of scripts at least 48 hours in advance was "disturbing" and was worried that its scripts could be leaked. PSP member Lee Hsien Yang responded to the controversy surrounding PAP candidate Ivan Lim Shaw Chuan, saying that it raised questions about the PAP's candidate screening process, and commented on how the PAP was not prepared for the controversy.	
27 June	RP	RP released its manifesto for the election with the slogan: "Build Back Better, Fairer", citing the goals of overcoming obstacles during the pandemic.	
27 June	SDA	SDA chairman Desmond Lim announced his decision to step down after the election, and would relinquish his post to SDA's chief media officer Harminder Pal Singh.	
27 June	WP	WP secretary-general Pritam Singh and chairman Sylvia Lim introduced five new candidates: three first-timers Nathaniel Koh Kim Kui, Tan Chen Chen and Muhammad Fadli Mohammed Fawzi, and Kenneth Foo Seck Guan and Terence Tan Li Chern, whom had previously contested in Nee Soon GRC and Marine Parade GRC respectively. Singh also urged for a greater opposition presence in parliament, saying that the PAP would still retain a strong mandate as it would be contesting in every (93) seat, compared to the WP contesting 21.	
27 June	PPP	PPP released its manifesto for the election, and secretary-general Goh Meng Seng announced that this will be his final involvement in a general election. He reiterated his belief that he could contribute more to Parliament as an opposition member if elected, compared to his counterpart Tin Pei Ling from the ruling PAP, though he acknowledged her contributions to MacPherson.	
27 June	DPP	DPP announced that they will not be participating in the general election and backed its informal alliance with RP and PPP.	
27 June	NSP	NSP confirmed that they will not be contesting in MacPherson SMC and backed PPP.	
27 June	PV	Three members of PV were approached by the police around Pasir Ris MRT station (within Pasir Ris–Punggol GRC) while they were doing community outreach after they were seen carrying a placard with photos of PAP MPs sleeping in Parliament on the placard. PV secretary-general Lim Tean claimed that this incident was the "sort of harassment that opposition members find themselves under all the time"; a police spokesman later said that PV's actions "amounted to a public demonstration, which requires a police permit."	
28 June		ELD announced that they had issued 226 Political Donation Certificates (out of 226 applications), 37 Certificates of The Malay Community Committee (out of 37 applications) and 34 Certificates of The Indian and Other Minority Communities Committee (out of 35 applications).	
28 June	PAP	PAP unveiled the candidates for three electoral divisions: Sembawang GRC: Education minister Ong Ye Kung announced on his Facebook page that he will be defending the constituency, along with incumbent MPs, Lim Wee Kiak and Vikram Nair, and two newcomers, Poh Li San and Mariam Jaafar.; Marsiling–Yew Tee GRC: National Development Minister Lawrence Wong and Alex Yam, as well as Chua Chu Kang GRC and Minister of State Zaqy Mohamad and a newcomer Hany Soh Hui Bin who would replace outgoing MP Ong Teng Koon.; Sengkang GRC: Labour Chief Ng Chee Meng, Senior Minister of State Lam Pin Min, Senior Parliamentary Secretary and Sembawang GRC MP Amrin Amin and a newcomer Raymond Lye who would replace outgoing MP Charles Chong.; PAP's candidate Shawn Huang Wei Zhong was criticised online about his tenure as a NDP commander in 2018 by a Warrant Officer in charge of the NDP logistics control group then. Huang would rebut the allegation raised. He also explained the history of the change of his surname from Ingkiriwang to Huang.	
28 June	WP	WP released its 39-page manifesto for the upcoming election, of which eight pages were devoted to the COVID-19 pandemic. WP secretary-general Pritam Singh and chairman Sylvia Lim introduced a final batch of four candidates, among which were new candidate Abdul Shariff Aboo Kassim, former NCMPs and Aljunied GRC candidates Leon Perera and Gerald Giam (both previously contested in East Coast GRC) and He Ting Ru (previously contested in Marine Parade GRC). Singh further explained WP's slogan "Make Your Vote Count", in that WP MPs must be voted into Parliament to serve the public in Parliament and strengthen democracy, adding that there was a "real risk" of a wipeout of elected opposition MPs. Giam, He and Perera, the party's manifesto team, listed and explained the proposals that the party was planning to put forward. Meanwhile, Lee Li Lian announced that she will not seek candidacy this election.	
28 June	SPP	SPP launched their manifesto for the election, titled "A Better Tomorrow", which highlights current issues, ranging from the cost of living and climate change to promoting greater democracy, among others.	
28 June	RDU	RDU released a 12-page charter during a Zoom teleconference; Ravi Philemon mentioned the charter is to give Singaporeans a choice that "allowing Singaporeans to point the Government towards the directions they would want the Government to take", while Michelle Lee Juan urged to give Singaporeans leverage so that "they alone can continue to operate Singapore (the way) they wish to."	
28 June		Independent candidate Victor Ronnie Lai announced that he is planning to contest in Pioneer SMC; if nominated, Pioneer SMC could see a rare four-cornered contest for the first time since the 1997 general election (for Chua Chu Kang SMC) and the 2013 by-election.	
29 June		ELD announced that applications for vehicles with loudspeakers installed will open after 2 pm during nomination day, though only pre-recorded campaigning messages are allowed for broadcast. They also announced arrangements for overseas voters which embassies are allowed to be open subject to the approval of the authorities, and returning Singaporeans will cast their votes in designated hotels whilst serving a mandatory 14-day stay home notice. ELD will announce further changes after the nomination.	
29 June	PAP	PAP unveiled the candidates for six electoral divisions: Tanjong Pagar GRC: Trade and Industry Minister Chan Chun Sing will defend the constituency, along with incumbent Minister in the Prime Minister's Office Indranee Rajah and backbencher Joan Pereira, and two newcomers Eric Chua Swee Leong and Alvin Tan Sheng Hui; backbencher Chia Shi-Lu will not stand for election.; Radin Mas SMC: Current Tanjong Pagar GRC MP Melvin Yong will replace outgoing Minister of State Sam Tan.; Jalan Besar GRC: Manpower Minister and Bishan–Toa Payoh GRC incumbent MP Josephine Teo will join the GRC to lead a team with incumbent mayor Denise Phua, Senior Minister of State Heng Chee How, and a newcomer Wan Rizal Wan Zakariah; backbencher Lily Neo will not seek re-election.; Jurong GRC: Senior Minister Tharman Shanmugaratnam will defend the constituency along with Senior Parliamentary Secretary Tan Wu Meng, backbencher Rahayu Mahzam, and two newcomers, Shawn Huang Wei Zhong and Xie Yao Quan (the latter replacing recently-withdrew candidate Ivan Lim Shaw Chuan). Social and Family Development Minister Desmond Lee and Ang Wei Neng were announced to be fielded elsewhere in another constituency.; Ang Mo Kio GRC: Prime Minister Lee Hsien Loong will defend this constituency along with incumbent MPs Darryl David and Gan Thiam Poh, and two newcomers, Ng Ling Ling and Nadia Ahmad Samdin; the party did not announce the whereabouts for the other three MPs Intan Azura Mokhtar, Ang Hin Kee and Koh Poh Koon, but later confirmed that only Koh would be fielded elsewhere in Tampines GRC. Hours after the reveal, Ng was the third PAP candidate to be criticised online about her attempt to take credit for setting up the Social Service Institute, the training arm of National Council of Social Service (NCSS) during her speech and later responded that her role was to help operationalise the institute. Former NMP and then-president of NCSS Gerard Ee mentioned her role on the incident was a "mere Freudian slip".; Kebun Baru SMC: Incumbent Nee Soon GRC MP Henry Kwek will defend the constituency.; Nee Soon GRC backbencher Er Lee Bee Wah confirms her retirement and will be replaced by Carrie Tan Huimin. The PAP lineup for the constituency was yet to be announced at the time.	
29 June	PAP; WP	In response to WP secretary-general Pritam Singh's earlier point that there could be a wipeout of elected opposition MPs, PAP secretary-general Lee Hsien Loong said that the possibility was an unrealistic outcome, claiming that Singh's argument was "a tactic" and added that he was "using reverse psychology". Two other PAP incumbent candidates, Chan Chun Sing and Indranee Rajah, also responded to Singh's point, saying that it would be a mistake for voters to think that the PAP would return to power effortlessly, while adding that it was important for the PAP to get a "clear and strong endorsement" from the people.	
29 June	SDP	On their Facebook page, SDP first unveiled two new candidates that it will be fielding for the election, Alfred Tan and Min Cheong; hours later, they unveiled another three candidates, first-timer Robin Low, James Gomez and ex-DPP leader Benjamin Pwee.	
29 June	SDP; SingFirst	Former SF secretary-general Tan Jee Say announced that he sought approval to rejoin SDP; if the party accepts his return, Tan will return to SDP for the first time since 2011, when he resigned from the party to seek candidacy for the presidential election held that year.	
29 June	PSP	PSP released its 13-page manifesto which focused on economical, social and political development, as well as its "resurgence strategy" to combat the ongoing COVID-19 pandemic. PSP also launched its slogan for the election, entitled "You Deserve Better". PSP member Lee Hsien Yang urged Singaporeans to vote to end the PAP's supermajority and allow for greater diversity in Parliament, claiming that the Singapore government was suffering from "eunuch's disease" and adding that the PAP supermajority has led to group-thinking but lack rigour in discussion and debate on policies.	
29 June	SDA	SDA released its manifesto for the upcoming election, entitled "SDA: A Heart for the People", which sought to tackle areas where SDA felt Singaporeans were struggling with, such as the cost of living, social inequality and immigration, among other issues.	

=== Nomination day ===
On 30 June 2020 from 11 am to 12 noon SGT, each candidate filed their nomination papers (along with the approval of a proposer, a seconder and at least four assentors), a political donation certificate (by before 26 June), and paid an election deposit of S$13,500 (down from S$14,500 in the previous 2015 election, but also the same amount as seen in the 2016 by-election) in one of the nine designated schools or through online to complete their application. Additionally, in the case for Group Representation Constituencies, their team must consist of at least one minority candidate and must also submit a community committee form (Malay/Muslim or Indian/other minority which is dependent on the constituency's requirements).

The list of nine schools designated as nomination centres were:

School	Participating constituencies
Bendemeer Primary School	Bishan–Toa Payoh GRC^{M}, Jalan Besar GRC^{M}, Radin Mas SMC, Tanjong Pagar GRC^{IO}
Chongfu School	Kebun Baru SMC, Marsiling–Yew Tee GRC^{M}, Nee Soon GRC^{IO}, Sembawang GRC^{M}
Deyi Secondary School	Aljunied GRC^{M}, Ang Mo Kio GRC^{IO}, Marymount SMC, Yio Chu Kang SMC
Jurong Pioneer Junior College	Chua Chu Kang GRC^{M}, Hong Kah North SMC, Pioneer SMC
Kong Hwa School	MacPherson SMC, Marine Parade GRC^{M}, Mountbatten SMC, Potong Pasir SMC
Methodist Girls’ School	Bukit Panjang SMC, Holland–Bukit Timah GRC^{IO}
Nan Hua High School	Bukit Batok SMC, Jurong GRC^{IO}, West Coast GRC^{IO}, Yuhua SMC
Poi Ching School	Hougang SMC, Tampines GRC^{M}
St Anthony's Canossian Primary School	East Coast GRC^{M}, Pasir Ris–Punggol GRC^{M}, Punggol West SMC, Sengkang GRC^{M}

- ^{M} indicates a GRC requires a Malay/Muslim minority candidate
- ^{IO} indicates a GRC requires an Indian or other minority candidate

As in the case of previous elections, candidates will lose their $13,500 deposit if they are unable to garner at least one-eighth (12.5%) of the valid votes cast within the contested constituency.

== Pre-polling day ==
The following is a list of events that occurred from nomination day (30 June 2020) until the eve of polling day on 10 July 2020. All times below are reflected in Singapore Standard Time (SGT). Similar to previous elections since 2011, candidates begin campaigning from the end of nominations day until two days before polling day. The eve of polling day and after the last day for the campaigning period is cooling-off day, where campaigning is prohibited except for party political broadcasts.

Date	Party	Events	Source
30 June		Nominations were held from 11 am for an hour at nine designated schools. At the close of nominations, the Elections Department confirmed a combined 192 candidates representing from 11 parties and one independent (up from 179 in the last general election) contesting all of the 31 constituencies and 93 parliamentary seats. This makes it the second constitutive election with an all-contest and no uncontested walkovers.	
30 June		Three independent candidates, Ooi Boon Ewe, Shirwin Eu and Cheng Peng Wah were seen in Methodist Girls' School, Kong Hwa School and Jurong Pioneer Junior College respectively; of the three, Cheng was the sole independent candidate to have his nomination papers confirmed for Pioneer SMC.	
30 June	PAP	PAP confirmed their teams for the remaining electoral divisions: Aljunied GRC: Three previously contested candidates Chua Eng Leong, Victor Lye, Shamsul Kamar, and two newcomers Alex Yeo Sheng Chye and Chan Hui Yuh.; Bishan-Toa Payoh GRC: Defence Minister Ng Eng Hen, Senior Minister of State Chee Hong Tat, Chong Kee Hiong and Saktiandi Supaat.; Bukit Batok SMC: Incumbent MP Murali Pillai will defend the constituency.; Bukit Panjang SMC: Incumbent Holland–Bukit Timah GRC MP Liang Eng Hwa will replace outgoing MP and mayor Teo Ho Pin to defend his constituency.; Chua Chu Kang GRC: Health Minister Gan Kim Yong, Senior Parliament Secretary and Mayor Low Yen Ling, and two new members Don Wee Boon Hong and Zhulkarnain Abdul Rahim. Incumbent MP Yee Chia Hsing did not seek reelection.; East Coast GRC: Deputy Prime and Finance Minister and Tampines GRC MP Heng Swee Keat, Senior Minister of State and Mayor Maliki Osman, Fengshan SMC MP Cheryl Chan, Jessica Tan and newcomer Tan Kiat How. Incumbent MPs Lee Yi Shyan and Lim Swee Say did not seek re-election. During PAP's acceptance speech, Jessica's wore her mask wrongly while Heng made several gaffes in his portion of the speech, which later went viral.; Holland–Bukit Timah GRC: Foreign Minister Vivian Balakrishnan, Senior Minister of State Sim Ann, Christopher de Souza and newcomer Edward Chia.; Hong Kah North SMC: Senior Minister of State Amy Khor will defend her constituency.; Hougang SMC: Previously contested candidate Lee Hong Chuang.; MacPherson SMC: Incumbent MP Tin Pei Ling will defend her constituency.; Marine Parade GRC: Incumbent Speaker Tan Chuan-Jin, Senior Minister of State Edwin Tong, Seah Kian Peng, and new members Tan See Leng and Mohd Fahmi Aliman. Incumbent MP Fatimah Lateef did not return.; Marymount SMC: Newcomer Gan Siow Huang.; Mountbatten SMC: Incumbent MP Lim Biow Chuan will defend his constituency.; Nee Soon GRC: Law and Home Affairs Minister K. Shanmugam, Muhammad Faishal Ibrahim, Louis Ng, and new members Carrie Tan and Derrick Goh.; Pasir Ris–Punggol GRC: Senior Minister Teo Chee Hean, Senior Minister of State Janil Puthucheary, and new members Mohamed Sharael Taha, Yeo Wan Ling and Desmond Tan Kok Ming. Incumbent MP Zainal Sapari did not return.; Pioneer SMC: Incumbent West Coast GRC MP Patrick Tay will replace outgoing MP Cedric Foo to defend his constituency.; Potong Pasir SMC: Incumbent MP Sitoh Yih Pin will defend his constituency.; Punggol West SMC: Incumbent MP Sun Xueling will defend her constituency.; Tampines GRC: Environment Minister Masagos Zulkifli, Senior Parliament Secretary Baey Yam Keng, ex-Ang Mo Kio GRC and Senior Minister of State Koh Poh Koon, mayor Desmond Choo and Cheng Li Hui.; West Coast GRC: Communications and Information Minister S. Iswaran, Social and Family Development Minister Desmond Lee, ex-Jurong GRC Ang Wei Neng, Foo Mee Har and new member Rachel Ong, replacing former Trade and Industry minister Lim Hng Kiang.; Yio Chu Kang SMC: Newcomer Yip Hon Weng.; Yuhua SMC: Culture, Community and Youth Minister Grace Fu will defend her constituency.	
30 June	PSP	It was revealed that Lee Hsien Yang would not be contesting in the election only after nominations had closed. PSP secretary-general Tan Cheng Bock later said that he wanted Lee to remain "as neutral as possible"; Lee also said that he decided against contesting in the election as he believed that "Singapore does not need another Lee." Tan, who contested West Coast GRC gave a formal acceptance speech that took over most of the allowed time, but stuttered at some parts of the speech, including a few times where he nearly mentioned his former PAP party instead of PSP, including the closing part ("You deserve better. Vote P... er, PSP. Thank you."). The resulting stutter also went viral.	
30 June	SDP	Tan Jee Say was confirmed to have returned to SDP, and he would lead a team to contest Holland–Bukit Timah GRC alongside James Gomez, Min Cheong and Alfred Tan. The party, besides Bukit Batok SMC, also confirmed their team lineup for three other electoral divisions: Bukit Panjang SMC: SDP Chairman Paul Tambyah; Marsiling-Yew Tee: Damanhuri Abas, Benjamin Pwee, Bryan Lim and Khung Wai Yeen; Yuhua SMC: Robin Low (Pwee was originally fielded at Yuhua but was later changed for unknown reasons)	
30 June	WP	WP confirmed its team lineup for four electoral divisions: Marine Parade GRC: Ron Tan Jun Yuen, former NCMP Yee Jenn Jong, and three new candidates Fadli Fawzi, Nathaniel Koh, and Muhammad Azhar Abdul Latip.; Punggol West SMC: New candidate Tan Chen Chen; Sengkang GRC: He Ting Ru, and three new candidates Louis Chua, Jamus Lim and Raeesah Khan; East Coast GRC: Kenneth Foo Seck Guan, Abdul Shariff Aboo Kassim, Terence Tan, Dylan Ng, and former NSP candidate Nicole Seah	
30 June	PAP; SDP	Following the confirmation of nominations for Bukit Batok SMC, incumbent PAP candidate Murali Pillai became the fourth PAP candidate to receive online criticism, this time from a post about his son. In response, Murali hit back, calling the post containing the criticism a "scurrilous attack against my family", adding that the timing of the post "leaves nothing to the imagination". His opponent, Dr Chee Soon Juan from SDP, said that he stood with Murali as well and criticised the post, writing that "politics is about ideas on how we can make our nation better, not personal attacks like this."	
30 June	PAP; PSP	During nomination day, while opposing parties were allowed to scrutinise nomination papers, both teams fielded by PAP and PSP respectively to contest Tanjong Pagar GRC found discrepancies in the opposing team's paperwork; however neither team objected to the opposing team, allowing the contest to go ahead. PAP's team saw a technical lapse in the PSP team's nomination paper (by not filling in the name of the constituency they were going to contest in); PAP later informed PSP of their technical lapse. PAP anchor minister Chan Chun Sing told the media that they wanted the voters "the chance to give us a strong mandate", and "not give that choice to residents just because of a technical error". Similarly, the PSP team spotted a potential error in the PAP team's nomination forms as well, with PSP candidate Michael Chua Teck Leong pointing out that PAP candidate Eric Chua Swee Leong had listed his occupation incorrectly.	
30 June	PV	PV confirmed its team lineup for two electoral divisions using its Facebook page: Pasir Ris–Punggol GRC: Jireh Lim, Prabu Ramachandran, Mohamed Nassir Ismail, Gilbert Goh Keow Wah, and Vigneswari Ramachandran; Jalan Besar GRC: Lim Tean, Leong Sze Hian, Nor Azlan Sulaiman, Michael Fang Amin	
30 June	NSP	NSP released its manifesto for the upcoming election, focusing on halting the GST hike and policy changes to the Central Provident Fund, among other areas such as public transport and defence expenditure.	
1 July	PV; SDP	The National Population and Talent Division of the Prime Minister's Office issued statements objecting to the claim that there would be a plan for a population of 10 million in Singapore, which was talked about by both SDP and PV in previous days.	
1 July	PAP; PSP; SDP; WP	Two political debates were held live within the Mediacorp Campus on Channel 5, CNA and Channel 8. Workers' Party did not participate in the Chinese-language debate, for which WP later apologised the following day; WP secretary-general Pritam Singh explained that "the proficiency required to participate in a live debate is of a higher order", but the WP would continue to support the party's Chinese supporters. During the English-language debate, SDP secretary-general Chee Soon Juan touched on one of its campaign promises of saying no to a 10 million population in Singapore, citing a 2019 article from The Straits Times, to which PAP representative Vivian Balakrishnan replied that the Prime Minister's Office had issued a statement that day "advising people like you not to indulge in falsehoods" and denied that there would be a population of 10 million in Singapore, adding that the figure was a "strawman".	
1 July	PAP; PSP	PAP incumbent candidate and Law and Home Affairs Minister K. Shanmugam, who is defending his seat at Nee Soon GRC, claimed that the PSP team contesting Nee Soon GRC was a "half-hearted" attempt, adding that PSP had been "offering to trade Nee Soon for some other constituency" with RP. In response to Shanmugam's claim, PSP candidate Bradley Bowyer said that it was a "rumour" that PSP had offered to cede Nee Soon GRC, adding that PAP's attempt "to delegitimise us is the current strategy". Later on, in a Facebook post, Shanmugam said that Bowyer was being "dishonest" to deny that PSP had offered to trade Nee Soon to the RP, to which PSP candidate Leong Mun Wai responded that PSP had always been committed to Nee Soon GRC, while PSP secretary-general Tan Cheng Bock said that contesting Nee Soon GRC was "non-negotiable". Separately, both the PSP and PAP also lodged police reports over finding their election posters damaged, which is illegal according to the Parliamentary Elections Act.	
1 July	Independent	Independent candidate Cheang Peng Wah revealed that he would be using a horse as his symbol to contest the upcoming election while on a walkabout around Pioneer SMC.	
1 July	NSP	NSP unveiled their team lineup for all electoral divisions: Sembawang GRC: Ivan Yeo Tiong Boon, Sathin S/O Ravindran, Sebastian Teo Kway Huang, Spencer Ng Chung Hon, and Yadzeth Hairis; Tampines GRC: Choong Hon Heng, Eugene Yeo Ren-Yuan, Reno Fong Chin Leong, Ridzwan Mohammad, and Vincent Ng	
2 July		At 8pm, the first round of party political broadcasts was aired on free-to-air television and radio channels (see Party political broadcasts below).	
2 July	NSP; PSP; SPP; WP	Several opposition parties had discussions on their plans if they were to be offered a place in parliament as a Non-constituency Member of Parliament. PSP secretary-general Tan Cheng Bock told on media that he would not accept an NCMP seat if offered one, calling the scheme as a ploy not to vote for the opposition, and cited that voting in candidates function as a base to serve efficiency in the House. Likewise, WP secretary-general Pritam Singh questioned the scheme as being a "magnanimity", and replied that it was "very speculative" and told that they would be addressed after the election, while in another interview, NCMP Dennis Tan replied it as a "poisoned chalice".	
2 July	PV	PV and its secretary-general Lim Tean were issued correction directions by the alternate authority of the Protection from Online Falsehoods and Manipulation Act Office over Singapore's government expenditure on foreign students.	
2 July	PV; SDA	PV and SDA both blamed each other over who had caused the three-cornered fight in Pasir Ris–Punggol GRC (the first such fight in a GRC since the 1992 Marine Parade by-election).	
2 July	PAP	PAP candidate and Education Minister Ong Ye Kung posted a video on Facebook that showed him having a conversation with a young boy. However, after the authorities informed the PAP that the video was not in line with electoral rules, the video was later taken down.	
2 July	PAP; WP	WP pushed back against PAP candidate Vivian Balakrishnan's claim that WP was just a "lite version" of the PAP made during the English political debate the previous day. WP secretary-general Pritam Singh said that Vivian's comments were an "electoral ploy", adding that "If that was the case, I hope the PAP takes up all our manifesto points and introduces them into their agenda." Pritam also questioned the PAP's "magnanimity" in highlighting the Non-Constituency Member of Parliament scheme.	
2 July	PAP; SDP	PAP candidate and Deputy Prime Minister Heng Swee Keat denied saying that Singapore should plan to increase its population to 10 million people, in response to SDP secretary-general Chee Soon Juan's speech in the English-language political debate the previous day. He reiterated the Singapore government's stance that it had "never proposed or targeted for Singapore to increase the population to 10 million". PAP candidate Vivian Balakrishnan also called for the SDP to clarify its claim. Nevertheless, the SDP later claimed victory for pressuring the PAP into declaring that it did not have a population target of 10 million, to which a PAP spokesman denounced as a "falsehood" which "renders the campaign pointless, and calls into question the integrity of the whole party".	
2 July	PAP; PSP	Both PSP and PAP were asked by ELD on request by the West Coast Town Council in West Coast GRC to remove some of their election posters in Clementi; West Coast Town Council cited public safety reasons as their justification behind removing the posters.	
2 July	RP	RP released a green manifesto that calls for a reduction of emissions to 40 per cent by 2030, with the aim of close to net zero emissions by 2050.	
3 July	PAP; PSP; SDP; WP	The dispute between the PAP and the SDP continued, with SDP chairman Paul Tambyah and secretary-general Chee Soon Juan defending SDP's decision to press the PAP about plans for a population target of 10 million for Singapore, saying that PAP was now forced to clarify and assure Singaporeans that there are no such plans. Paul pointed out that PAP could have clarified the matter earlier but did not do so, adding that he was "baffled" that the PAP called the target a "falsehood" perpetuated by the SDP. Both WP and PSP also reacted to the dispute; WP secretary-general Pritam Singh said that there was "room for fair comment" as it was not clear if SDP's stance could be considered a "falsehood" or not; however he did not endorse either side and said that it was a matter that WP was not involved in. Separately, PSP secretary-general Tan Cheng Bock said that the issue came about due to a lack of transparency from the Singapore government. Deputy Prime Minister Heng Swee Keat claimed that the SDP had "erected a bogeyman" and said that he was expecting integrity and honesty from all candidates contesting in the election, to which Tambyah said that the PAP "should take up any unhappiness it may have over the claim with The Straits Times", adding that Singaporeans should read the article concerned to make their own judgements. PAP later issued a statement, saying that it was "disappointed but not surprised" at SDP's response, and claimed that "the SDP have dug their heels in, repeated their falsehoods and refused to apologise to Singaporeans for misleading them" and that "Dr Chee has not changed, cannot change and will never change".	
4 July		In a joint statement by ICA and ELD, 101 Singaporeans would not be able to vote in this general election due to a glitch in the ICA system that processes the local contact address submitted by overseas Singaporeans for the purposes of voting.	
4 July	PAP; SDP	SDP chairman Paul Tambyah and secretary-general Chee Soon Juan responded to PAP's statement issued the previous day; Tambyah said that PAP's comments were "a sign of desperation" and that it showed that PAP had "run out of ideas" and "resorted to the old PAP tactics of just politics of personal destruction", while Chee said PAP was "beating a dead horse". Nevertheless, the two SDP leaders said that it was time for the election campaign to move on from the dispute. In addition, the Association of Women for Action and Research criticised PAP's statement to SDP the previous day as PAP had used an analogy involving spousal abuse to make a point.	
4 July	SDP; PV	Both SDP and PV's Facebook pages, as well as several other Facebook pages belonging to others, were issued correction directions by the alternate authority of the Protection from Online Falsehoods and Manipulation Act Office over the claim of plans for a population target of 10 million for Singapore.	
5 July	WP	Two separate police reports were lodged against Sengkang GRC WP's candidate Raeesah Khan for allegedly making two online comments, both relating to the discrimination of race and religion; one police report was lodged on 4 July against her Facebook post on 17 May 2020, which had criticised the Singapore law enforcement authorities for discriminating against Singapore citizens and said that rich Chinese and white people were treated differently under the law, and another police report on 5 July for her Facebook post on 2 February 2018 that focused on the 2018 City Harvest Church ruling. WP later came out to support Raeesah; Raeesah also apologised and released a statement stating that her intention was "never to cause social divisions but to raise awareness on minority issues", adding that she also regretted making her "insensitive" comments. Since the incident, many netizens labelled her actions as a political move by other parties and many residents criticises her while being investigated, with hashtags such as #IStandWithRaeesah were trending on Twitter. A Change.org petition was made on 6 July to let Raeesah campaign smoothly while conduct investigations only after the elections, which has since garnered over 18,500 signatures. On 7 July, the police revealed that they’re investigating the man who allegedly reported Raeesah over social media comments intended to wound religious and racial feelings.	
5 July	PAP	Marsiling–Yew Tee GRC candidate Hany Soh Hui Bin fractured her left foot during a house visit in Woodgrove. She uploaded photos of herself bounded in a wheelchair and another photo of her left foot in a cast, and told media that she was determined to see as much residents as possible in other ways possible while having to reduce house visits in about four weeks. At 21:56, a netizen had lodged a police report against Minister for Education Ong Ye Kung for possibly abetting a primary school child to take part in election activities.This was presumably in relation to a three-minute video posted on Ong's Facebook page where Ong was having a dialogue with a young boy from Sembawang, the constituency he is contesting in. After he was informed the video violates election rules, Ong immediately took the video down, apologising for any inconvenience caused. Following the report against Ong, an anonymous police report was lodged against Deputy Prime Minister Heng Swee Keat at 22:58 for his forum speech at the Nanyang Technological University on 28 March 2019, promoting enmity between different groups on grounds or religion or race and doing acts prejudicial to maintenance of harmony, and the user cited its purpose is to be socially divisive and says he feels unsafe in Singapore as someone, including the succeeding prime minister, that came from a minority race, including references from Senior Minister Tharman Shanmugaratnam. PAP has yet to release a statement.	
6 July		The ELD made an announcement to advise candidates and parties to refrain shouting or drawing crowd unnecessarily as a COVID-19 safe distancing measure after a recent increase of imported and community cases over recent days and also the campaigning for West Coast GRC the previous day.	
6 July	PAP; WP	A netizen lodged a report against the People's Action Party's press statement, claiming that the PAP statement had promoted "enmity between different groups on grounds of religion or race under section 298A of the penal code". In a statement on 8 July, the police have deemed that no offence has been committed by the PAP, after police reports were made against the party for its statement in regard to WP's candidate Raeesah Khan.	
7 July	PAP	The Singapore Police Force, after consulting with the Attorney-General's Chambers, has released a statement that "Mr Heng's remarks, in the context they were made, do not evidence any intent to wound anyone's racial feelings or promote enmity between different races,". Since news broke of the statement released by the police, netizens have spoken out about how they felt it was a racist statement.	
9 July		At 8pm, the second round of party political broadcasts was aired on free-to-air television and radio channels (see Party political broadcasts below).	

=== Online e-rallies ===
In this election, e-rallies served as replacements to physical rallies, which were unavailable due to precautionary measures from the ongoing COVID-19 pandemic. The contesting parties have taken to various social media platforms such as Facebook, YouTube, and Instagram, as well as media outlets like Singapore Press Holdings’ Chinese Media Group to deliver speeches, hold discussions and engage with voters. On 30 June, the ELD announced that ten different venues in Suntec Convention Centre would be made available daily for campaigning and live-streaming online rallies; applications to reserve one of the venues opened on Nomination Day after nominations had closed.

=== Political debate ===
Debates were live telecast on 1 July 2020. Two round table debates each airing for an hour were held with a moderator on the current issues in Singapore, broadcast in English at 8 pm on Channel 5 and CNA938, and at 9 pm in Chinese on Channel 8 and Capital 95.8FM. A rerun of the English broadcast was broadcast at 9 pm on CNA. The candidates that participated in the debate were:

2020 Singaporean general election debates
No.	Date & Time	Broadcaster	Language	Moderator	Participants			
Key: P Present A Absent					PAP	PSP	WP	SDP
1	1 July; 8:00 p.m.–9:00 p.m.	Mediacorp Channel 5 CNA938	English	Jaime Ho	P Vivian Balakrishnan	P Francis Yuen	P Jamus Lim	P Chee Soon Juan
2	1 July; 9:00 p.m.–10:00 p.m.	Mediacorp Channel 8 Capital 95.8FM	Mandarin	Tung Soo Hua	P Ong Ye Kung	P Leong Mun Wai	A	P Bryan Lim

=== Party political broadcasts ===
Similar to previous elections since 1980, parties who field at least six candidates for the election are eligible for participating in the party broadcast, with the allocated time depending on the number of participating candidates. The order of appearance is based on the number of candidates starting from the lowest.

Time allocated for political broadcast
Time allocated (minutes)	Participating parties						
Time allocated (minutes)	PAP	NSP	PSP	PV	RP	SDP	WP
Time allocated (minutes)	13	3	5	3	2.5	3	4.5

Channels aired on broadcast
Language	Time	Channels aired
English	8pm	Channel 5, CNA938, CLASS 95, GOLD 905, cna.Asia, CNA YouTube, CNA Facebook, TODAY
English	9pm	CNA
Chinese	8pm	Channel 8, Capital 958, 8world.com
Chinese	11.45 pm	Channel U (11.30 pm for second broadcast)
Malay	8.30 pm	Suria, Warna 942 (8.35 pm)
Tamil	9pm	Vasantham, Oli 968

List of candidates participating in the first broadcast (2 July)
Language	Participating parties (in order of appearance)						
Language	RP	NSP	PV	SDP	WP	PSP	PAP
English	Charles Yeo	Spencer Ng	Michael Fang Amin	Chee Soon Juan	Pritam Singh	Tan Cheng Bock	Heng Swee Keat
Chinese	Darren Soh	Did not participate	Michael Fang Amin	Khung Wai Yeen	Sylvia Lim	Hazel Poa	Chan Chun Sing
Malay	Noraini Yunus	Did not participate	Nassir Ismail	Damanhuri Abas	Faisal Manap	Taufik Supan	Maliki Osman
Tamil	Did not participate	Did not participate	Vigneswari Ramachandran	Did not participate	Did not participate	Kala Manickam	S Iswaran

List of candidates participating in the second broadcast (9 July)
Language	Participating parties (in order of appearance)						
Language	RP	NSP	PV	SDP	WP	PSP	PAP
English	Kenneth Jeyaretnam	Spencer Ng	Lim Tean	Paul Tambyah	Sylvia Lim	Tan Cheng Bock	Lee Hsien Loong
Chinese	Darren Soh	Spencer Ng	Michael Fang Amin	Bryan Lim	Dennis Tan	Tan Meng Wah	Lee Hsien Loong
Malay	Noraini Yunus	Ridzwan Mohammad	Nor Azlan Sulaiman	Damanhuri Abas	Abdul Shariff Aboo Kassim	A’bas Bin Kasmani	Masagos Zulkifli
Tamil	Did not participate	Did not participate	Sivakumaran Chellappa	Did not participate	Did not participate	Kumaran Pillai	K Shanmugam

Note: Jeyaretnam recorded his speech in a hotel instead of at the studio while he was still serving his mandatory 14-day Stay Home Notice.

=== Constituency Political Broadcasts ===
In a historic first for elections, a new Constituency Political broadcast will be held between 3 and 8 July on 7 pm every evening during the campaigning period. The allotted time for broadcast is three-minutes per candidate. The broadcasts are pre-recorded. The order of appearance begin with incumbent parties followed by opposing parties, and constituencies are ordered based on alphabetical order, with one GRC or two SMCs in one segment.

List of Constituency Political Broadcasts
Date	Participating constituencies (in order of appearance)	Remarks
3 July	Aljunied GRC; Ang Mo Kio GRC; Bishan–Toa Payoh GRC; Bukit Batok SMC; Bukit Panjang SMC	Only Charles Yeo and Noraini Yunus were present during the RP's broadcast for Ang Mo Kio GRC.; Osman Sulaiman was absent during the SPP's broadcast for Bishan–Toa Payoh GRC.
4 July	Chua Chu Kang GRC; East Coast GRC; Holland–Bukit Timah GRC; Hong Koh North SMC; Hougang SMC	
5 July	Jalan Besar GRC; Jurong GRC; Kebun Baru SMC; MacPherson SMC; Marine Parade GRC	
6 July	Marsiling–Yew Tee GRC; Marymount SMC; Mountbatten SMC; Nee Soon GRC; Pasir Ris–Punggol GRC	Broadcast began at 7.19 pm and ended at 9.08 pm, due to technical difficulties on Mediacorp's end. No commercials were aired between segments on that day.
7 July	Pioneer SMC; Potong Pasir SMC; Punggol West SMC; Radin Mas SMC; Sembawang GRC; Sengkang GRC	Kumar Appavoo was absent during RP's broadcast for Radin Mas SMC (hence no RP broadcast was made).; Ivan Yeo and Sebastian Teo were absent during the NSP's broadcast for Sembawang GRC.
8 July	Tampines GRC; Tanjong Pagar GRC; West Coast GRC; Yio Chu Kang SMC; Yuhua SMC	
