= Build Back Better =

Build Back Better may refer to:

- Building Back Better, a United Nations Program
- Building Back Better, a program of disaster relief organization Medair
- Build Back Better, a slogan of the Joe Biden 2020 presidential campaign
  - Build Back Better Plan, an economic and infrastructure package proposed by Joe Biden
  - Build Back Better Act, a bill introduced in the 117th Congress
- Build Back Better World, an initiative taken by G7 countries
- Build Back Better, US president Bill Clinton's humanitarian program in Haiti
- Build Back Better, a motto of Zamboanga City, Philippines
- Build Back Better, a slogan in the 2020 Singaporean general election
