= Choo Pei Ling =

Singaporean neuroscientist and politician

The Honourable Choo Pei Ling
- 朱佩玲

Member of Parliament for Chua Chu Kang GRC
- Incumbent
- Assumed office 3 May 2025
- Preceded by: PAP held
- Majority: 23,578 (27.20%)

Personal details
- Born: 1986 or 1987 (age 39–40) Singapore
- Party: People's Action Party
- Education: Glasgow Caledonian University
- Occupation: Neuroscientist

Choo Pei Ling (Note: Chinese: 朱佩玲; pinyin: Zhū Pèilíng) (born 1986 or 1987) is a Singaporean neuroscientist and politician. A member of the ruling People's Action Party (PAP), she is a Member of Parliament (MP) for Chua Chu Kang Group Representation Constituency (GRC) since 2025.

== Career ==
Choo Pei Ling is a neuroscientist and Singapore Institute of Technology assistant professor.

== Political career ==
Prior to entering politics, Choo was a neuroscientist. She first started her political career as a Second Grassroots Advisor for the Kembangan-Chai Chee ward in Marine Parade GRC after Tan Chuan-Jin resigned over a extramarital affair in 2023. Choo was later fielded in Chua Chu Kang GRC was elected into the Parliament of Singapore on 3 May 2025 as part of People's Action Party's team for Chua Chu Kang GRC representing the Tengah ward. Choo has served as the Vice-Chairman of the Chua Chu Kang Town Council (CCKTC) since 2025.

== Notes ==
Parliament of Singapore
Preceded by Zhulkarnain Abdul Rahim; Don Wee; Gan Kim Yong; Low Yen Ling	Member of Parliament for Chua Chu Kang GRC; 2025–present Served alongside: (2025–present): Jeffrey Siow, Zhulkarnain Abdul Rahim, Tan See Leng	Incumbent
