= National Space Agency of Singapore =

Space agency of Singapore

Agency overview
- Formed: 1 April 2026
- Preceding agency: Office of Space Technology & Industry
- Jurisdiction: Government of Singapore
- Employees: 30
- Agency executive: Ngiam Le Na, Chief Executive
- Parent department: Ministry of Energy, Trade and Industry
- Website: www.space.gov.sg

The National Space Agency of Singapore (NSAS) is a department of the Ministry of Energy, Trade and Industry set up in 2026. It aims to allow Singapore to leverage on the opportunities and potential of the global space economy for national and regional needs, building upon the functions of the former Office of Space Technology & Industry.

As of April 2026, the current Chief Executive of NSAS is Ngiam Le Na. She previously served as Deputy Chief Executive Officer at DSO National Laboratories.

== Background ==
The Office for Space Technology and Industry (OSTIn) was set up in 2013 to drive the development of small satellite capabilities and new sensor technologies. In 2020, its mandate expanded to include the development of the workforce in the industry, as well as to grow international partnerships.

In 2022, OSTIn launched the Space Technology Development Programme with $210 million in funding for space technology development and talent training.

== History ==
NSAS was first announced by Minister-in-charge of Energy and Science and Technology Tan See Leng on 2 February 2026. It replaced the former OSTIn, which was folded into NSAS. It has a staff of 30 officers from the former OSTIn.

In July 2026, NSAS and the Japan Aerospace Exploration Agency signed a memorandum of cooperation at the SPACETIDE conference in Tokyo. It was the first bilateral space-agency agreement between Singapore and Japan. The agreement covered cooperation in space-technology development and applications, space science and exploration, industry development, education and outreach, and policy and regulatory exchanges. The agencies also agreed to promote collaboration between Singaporean and Japanese companies through JAXA's Co-funded Business Promotion Framework.

== Function ==
The National Space Agency of Singapore is responsible for coordinating the development and implementation of national space-related policies and programmes. Its functions include supporting research and development in space technologies, facilitating the growth of the domestic space industry, and promoting international cooperation.

The agency also oversees the development of regulatory frameworks governing space activities in Singapore and coordinates space-related operations across government agencies. According to official statements, it does not prioritise the development of launch capabilities due to spatial constraints.

== See also ==
- 2026 in Singapore
