= Jeffrey Siow =

Singaporean politician (born 1978 or 1979)

The Honourable Jeffrey Siow
- 萧振祥
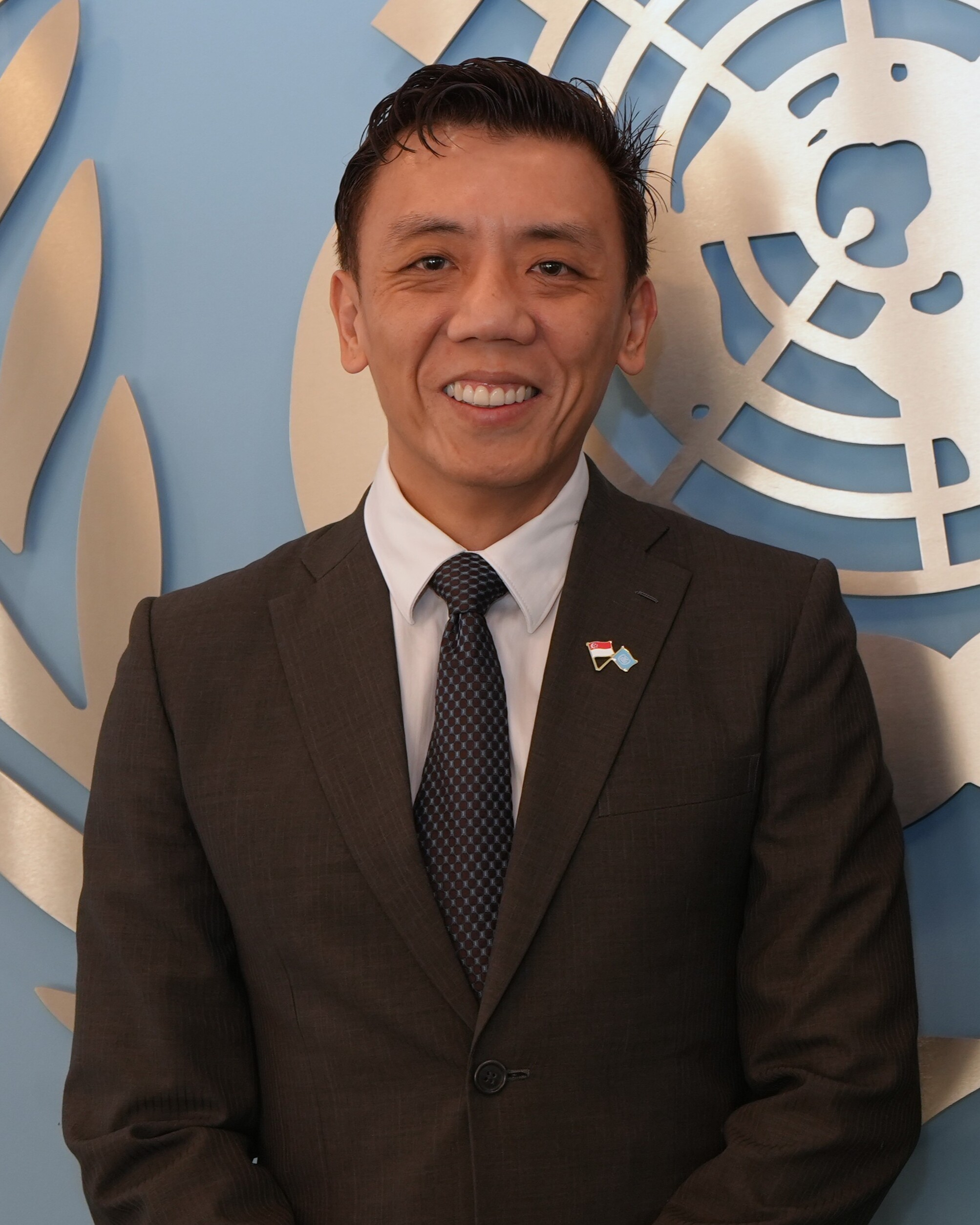
- Siow in 2025

Minister for Transport
- Incumbent
- Assumed office 27 July 2026; Acting: 23 May 2025 – 27 July 2026
- Prime Minister: Lawrence Wong
- Preceded by: Chee Hong Tat

Second Minister for Finance
- Incumbent
- Assumed office 27 July 2026 Serving with Indranee Rajah (2026–present)
- Minister: Lawrence Wong
- Preceded by: Lawrence Wong (2021)

Member of Parliament for Chua Chu Kang GRC
- Incumbent
- Assumed office 3 May 2025
- Preceded by: PAP held
- Majority: 23,578 (27.20%)

Personal details
- Born: Jeffrey Siow Chen Siang; 1978 (age 47–48) Singapore
- Party: People's Action Party
- Children: 2
- Education: Cornell University (BA, BS); MIT Sloan School of Management (MBA)

Jeffrey Siow Chen Siang (Note: Chinese: 萧振祥; pinyin: Xiāo Zhènxiáng; In this Chinese name, the family name is Siow. In accordance with custom, the Western-style name is Jeffrey Siow and the Chinese-style name is Siow Chen Siang) (born 1978) is a Singaporean politician and former civil servant who has served as the Minister for Transport since 2025. A member of the ruling People's Action Party (PAP), he is a Member of Parliament (MP) for Chua Chu Kang Group Representation Constituency (GRC) since 2025.

Siow served as a civil servant within multiple government agencies for 24 years. He previously served as principal private secretary (PPS) to Prime Minister Lee Hsien Loong between 2017 and 2021, and was serving as second permanent secretary at the Ministry of Manpower (MOM) and Ministry of Trade and Industry (MTI) at the time of his resignation. He was the most senior of public servants who stepped down to join politics ahead of the 2025 general election.

== Early life and education ==
Siow grew up in a one-room public housing rental flat in Henderson. He earned a Public Service Commission scholarship and studied economics and urban planning at Cornell University.

== Civil service career ==
Siow became a deputy director at the Civil Service College in 2005 and served until 2009. He then served as a deputy director at the Ministry of Education (MOE) between 2009 and 2011.

From 2012 until 2017, Siow was a director at the Ministry of Transport (MOT). During his tenure, he oversaw projects such as the Bus Contracting Model, the failed Kuala Lumpur–Singapore high-speed rail and the Johor Bahru–Singapore Rapid Transit System, and was part of a team tasked to plan the Thomson–East Coast MRT line.

In 2017, Siow was appointed as principal private secretary (PPS) to then-Prime Minister Lee Hsien Loong, a role which he served until 2021. In September that year, he became a member of the board of directors at the Infocomm Media Development Authority, and held this position until 2022. He was the first managing director and chief operating officer of Enterprise Singapore from September 2021 until he stepped down on 31 December 2023.

Siow was appointed as second permanent secretary at the Ministry of Manpower (MOM) in October 2023, with his tenure beginning on 1 January 2024. He concurrently served as second permanent secretary at the Ministry of Trade and Industry (MTI) since September 2024.

== Political career ==
On 2 April 2025, Siow retired from his positions at MOM and MTI. He was the most senior of civil servants to resign ahead of the upcoming general election that year.

Siow was revealed to have joined the People's Action Party (PAP) team contesting Chua Chu Kang Group Representation Constituency (GRC), alongside Deputy Prime Minister Gan Kim Yong, incumbent Member of Parliament (MP) Zhulkarnain Abdul Rahim and neuroscientist Choo Pei Ling. He said to The Business Times that he viewed politics as "an extension of public service", and told The Straits Times that while he did not consider joining politics until "recently", he felt "it was just time for [him] to take a different tack". During nomination day, Gan was transferred to Punggol GRC, with Manpower Minister Tan See Leng transferring from Marine Parade–Braddell Heights GRC to take his place. Henceforth Siow contested Chua Chu Kang GRC with Tan, Zhulkarnain, and Choo, with the team winning the election with 63.59% of the votes and a majority of 23,512 against the Progress Singapore Party.

On 21 May 2025, Siow was appointed as acting Minister for Transport and Senior Minister of State for Finance in the Second Lawrence Wong Cabinet. He succeeded Chee Hong Tat who became Minister for National Development in the former role. On 22 July 2026, prime minister Lawrence Wong announced that Siow would be appointed Minister for Transport and Second Minister for Finance, effective from 27 July 2026.

== Personal life ==
Siow is married and has a son and a younger daughter who were born two years apart. He is a football enthusiast and plays the sport during his free time on weekends. He is also interested in science fiction, listing The Three-Body Problem and authors including Isaac Asimov and Ted Chiang as among his favourites in the genre.

== Notes ==
Parliament of Singapore
| Preceded by Zhulkarnain Abdul Rahim; Don Wee; Gan Kim Yong; Low Yen Ling | Member of Parliament for Chua Chu Kang GRC; 2025–present Served alongside: Choo Pei Ling, Zhulkarnain Abdul Rahim, Tan See Leng | Incumbent |
