= Gan Kim Yong =

Singaporean politician (born 1959)

The Honourable Gan Kim Yong
- 颜金勇
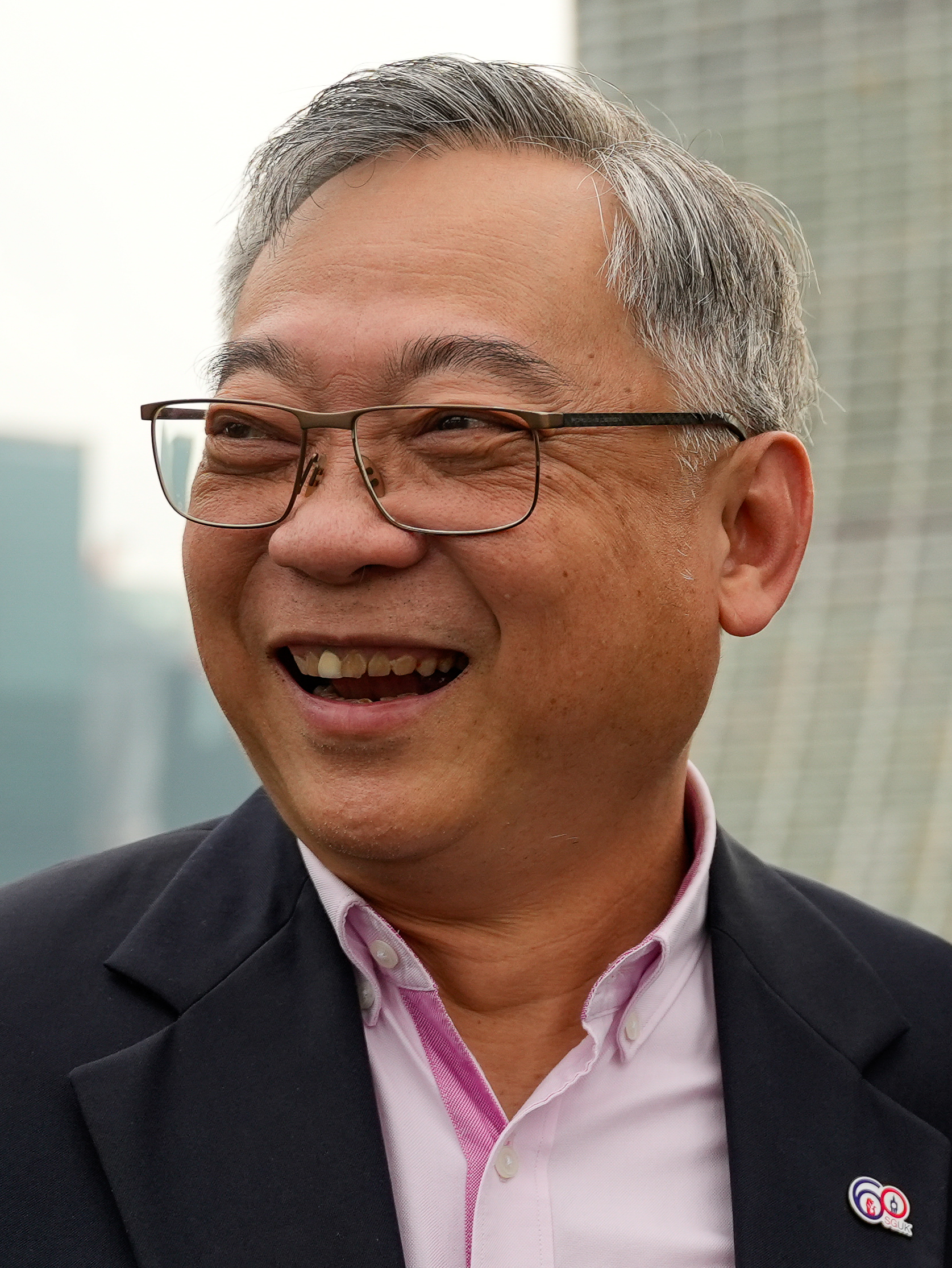
- Gan in 2025

Deputy Prime Minister of Singapore
- Incumbent
- Assumed office 15 May 2024 Serving with Heng Swee Keat (2019–2025)
- Prime Minister: Lawrence Wong
- Preceded by: Lawrence Wong; Heng Swee Keat

Minister for Trade and Industry
- Incumbent
- Assumed office 15 May 2021
- Prime Minister: Lee Hsien Loong; Lawrence Wong
- Second Minister: Tan See Leng
- Preceded by: Chan Chun Sing

Chairman of the Monetary Authority of Singapore
- Incumbent
- Assumed office 15 May 2024
- Prime Minister: Lawrence Wong
- Deputy Chairman: Chee Hong Tat (from 23 August)
- Preceded by: Lawrence Wong

6th Chairman of the People's Action Party
- In office 23 November 2018 – 26 November 2022
- Preceded by: Khaw Boon Wan
- Succeeded by: Heng Swee Keat

Minister for Health
- In office 21 May 2011 – 14 May 2021
- Prime Minister: Lee Hsien Loong
- Second Minister: Masagos Zulkifli (from 2020)
- Preceded by: Khaw Boon Wan
- Succeeded by: Ong Ye Kung

Party Whip of the People's Action Party
- In office 21 May 2011 – 27 September 2015
- Preceded by: Lim Swee Say
- Succeeded by: Chan Chun Sing

Minister for Manpower
- In office 1 April 2009 – 20 May 2011; Acting: 1 April 2008 – 31 March 2009
- Prime Minister: Lee Hsien Loong
- Preceded by: Ng Eng Hen
- Succeeded by: Tharman Shanmugaratnam

Member of the Singapore Parliament for Punggol GRC
- Incumbent
- Assumed office 4 May 2025
- Preceded by: Constituency established
- Majority: 11,956 (10.34%)

Member of the Singapore Parliament for Chua Chu Kang GRC
- In office 7 May 2011 – 15 April 2025
- Preceded by: Constituency established
- Succeeded by: PAP held
- Majority: 2011: 32,825 (22.40%); 2015: 59,271 (53.78%); 2020: 17,520 (17.28%)

Member of the Singapore Parliament for Chua Chu Kang SMC
- In office 6 May 2006 – 7 May 2011
- Preceded by: Low Seow Chay
- Succeeded by: Constituency established
- Majority: 4,864 (20.74%)

Member of the Singapore Parliament for Holland–Bukit Panjang GRC
- In office 25 October 2001 – 6 May 2006
- Preceded by: Constituency established
- Succeeded by: Constituency abolished
- Majority: N/A (walkover)

Personal details
- Born: 9 February 1959 (age 67) Colony of Singapore
- Party: People's Action Party
- Spouse: Esther Loh
- Children: 2
- Education: University of Cambridge (BA, MA)

Gan Kim Yong (Note: Chinese: 颜金勇; Pe̍h-ōe-jī: Gân Kim-ióng; pinyin: Yán Jīnyǒng) (born 9 February 1959) is a Singaporean politician who has been serving as Deputy Prime Minister of Singapore since 2024 and Minister for Trade and Industry since 2021. A member of the governing People's Action Party (PAP), he has been the Member of Parliament (MP) representing the Punggol North division of Punggol Group Representation Constituency (GRC) since 2025. He had previously represented the Zhenghua division of Holland–Bukit Panjang GRC between 2001 and 2006, Chua Chu Kang Single Member Constituency (SMC) between 2006 and 2011, and the Chua Chu Kang division of Chua Chu Kang GRC between 2011 and 2025.

Prior to entering politics, Gan worked in the Ministry of Trade and Industry (MTI) and Ministry of Home Affairs (MHA). He joined NatSteel in 1989 and became the chief executive officer (CEO) and president of NatSteel in 2005. Gan made his political debut in the 2001 general election as part of a five-member PAP team contesting in Holland–Bukit Panjang GRC and won by an uncontested walkover.

Gan previously served as Minister for Manpower between 2008 and 2011, Minister for Health between 2011 and 2021, Chairman of the People's Action Party between 2018 and 2022 and Deputy Chairman of the Monetary Authority of Singapore from 3 July 2023 to 14 May 2024. He currently serves as Deputy Prime Minister since 15 May 2024, Minister for Trade and Industry since 15 May 2021, Chairman of the Monetary Authority of Singapore since 15 May 2024, Chairman of the EDB's International Advisory Council since 1 June, taking over from Prime Minister Wong who previously served as Chairman following former SM and current President Tharman's resignation to run for the Presidency and Director of the GIC since 1 October 2024.

== Education ==
Gan was educated at Catholic High School and National Junior College before he received an Overseas Merit Scholarship from the Singapore Government to study at the University of Cambridge, where he completed a Bachelor of Arts degree in Engineering in 1981.

He subsequently received a Master of Arts in Engineering from the University of Cambridge in 1985.

== Career ==
Gan began his career in the Civil Service, working at the Ministry of Trade and Industry (MTI) and Ministry of Home Affairs (MHA). He left the Civil Service for the private sector in 1989 and joined NatSteel. In 1996, he became Executive Vice President of NatSteel and CEO of NatSteel Resorts International and NatSteel Properties. In 2005, he became President and CEO of NatSteel.

In February 2018, Gan was appointed by the World Health Organization (WHO) to serve on the Commission on Non-Communicable Diseases, which aims to identify innovative ways to curb diseases that are not transmitted from person to person, such as diabetes, cancer and heart disease, and extend life expectancy.

On 13 May 2024, it was announced that Gan had been appointed as the chairman of the Monetary Authority of Singapore. On 12 June, it was announced that Gan had become the new chairman of the Economic Development Board's International Advisory Council from 1 June, taking over from Lawrence Wong. On 24 September, it was announced that Gan would join the GIC as a director from 1 October.

In April 2025, Gan was questioned, in an open letter by former Income Insurance CEO Tan Suee Chieh, about MAS's lapse of regulatory oversight, and how Gan, as former chairman of the Singapore Labour Foundation, held a unique role in the decisions that impacted the direction of Income.

=== Political career ===
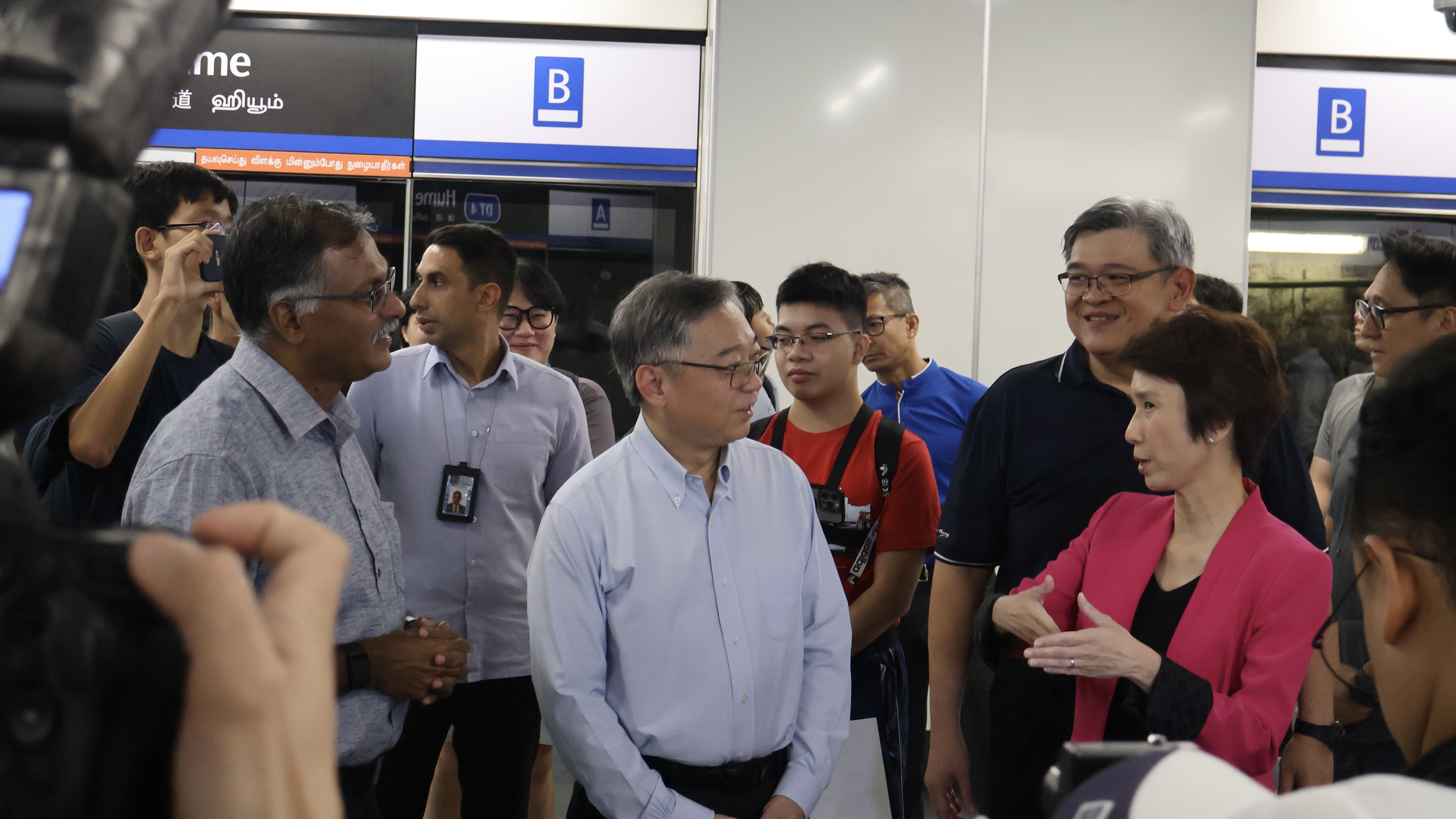
Gan (centre) at the opening of Hume MRT station on 28 February 2025

Gan made his political debut in the 2001 general election as part of a five-member PAP team contesting in Holland–Bukit Panjang GRC and won by an uncontested walkover. Gan was subsequently elected as the Member of Parliament representing the Zhenghua ward of Holland–Bukit Panjang GRC. In 2005, he was appointed as Minister of State for Education and Minister of State for Manpower.

During the 2006 general election, Gan replaced Low Seow Chay as the PAP candidate contesting in Chua Chu Kang SMC and won 60.37% of the vote. On 1 April 2008, he was appointed as Acting Minister for Manpower and later promoted to full Minister on 1 April 2009.

During the 2011 general election, Gan led the five-member PAP team contesting in the newly-formed Chua Chu Kang GRC and won 61.20% of the vote. He continued serving as the Member of Parliament representing the Chua Chu Kang ward of Chua Chu Kang GRC. On 21 May 2011, he relinquished his portfolio as Minister for Manpower and took up a new portfolio as Minister for Health. On 11 September 2011, Gan took over as chairman of the Singapore Labour Foundation.

During the 2015 general election, Gan led the four-member PAP team contesting in Chua Chu Kang GRC and won 76.89% of the vote. On 9 June 2018, Gan handed over his position as chairman of the Singapore Labour Foundation to Lawrence Wong. On 23 November 2018, Gan succeeded Khaw Boon Wan as Chairman of the People's Action Party.

During the 2020 general election, Gan led a four-member PAP team contesting in Chua Chu Kang GRC and won about 59% of the vote. During the COVID-19 pandemic in Singapore, Gan and Lawrence Wong were appointed co-chairs of a multi-ministerial committee set up by the government on 22 January 2020 to manage the situation. Following a Cabinet reshuffle, on 15 May 2021, Gan became Minister for Trade and Industry.

On 15 May 2024, after a cabinet reshuffle, Gan remained as Minister for Trade and Industry and assumed the role of Deputy Prime Minister.

During the 2025 general election, it was announced that Gan would remain at Chua Chu Kang GRC. However, on Nomination Day, he was nominated to contest for Punggol GRC against the Workers' Party (WP) team led by Harpreet Singh Nehal as the lead anchor for Punggol. During the election rally, Gan's claim that he was "good friends" with Prime Minister Lawrence Wong and that he would talk to Wong after to get more money to build necessary infrastructure was called into question by the opposition Workers' Party, which stated that the civil service would allocate funds and projects fairly. Eventually, Gan and his team eventually won the election with 55.17% of the votes.

On 21 May, Prime Minister Lawrence Wong announced his new cabinet line-up with Gan remaining as the Minister for Trade and Industry and also as the Deputy Prime Minister. Gan would be the only deputy prime minister while the Cabinet typically had two deputy prime ministers. Gan will also be the Acting Prime Minister in Wong's absence.

== Personal life ==
Gan is married to Esther Loh. They have two daughters. A Christian, he adheres to Presbyterianism, and is an elder at the Chen Li Presbyterian Church.

== Notes ==
Political offices
Preceded by Ng Eng Hen	Minister for Manpower; 2009–2011; Acting: 2008–2009	Succeeded by Tharman Shanmugaratnam
Preceded by Khaw Boon Wan	Minister for Health; 2011–2021	Succeeded by Ong Ye Kung
Preceded by Chan Chun Sing	Minister of Trade and Industry; 2021–present	Incumbent
Parliament of Singapore
New constituency	Member of Parliament for Holland–Bukit Panjang GRC; 2001–2006; Served alongside: Lim Swee Say, David Lim Tik En, Vivian Balakrishnan, Teo Ho Pin	Constituency abolished
Preceded by Low Seow Chay	Member of Parliament for Chua Chu Kang SMC; 2006–2011	Constituency abolished
New constituency	Member of Parliament for Chua Chu Kang GRC; 2011–2025; Served alongside: (2011-2015): Low Yen Ling, Zaqy Mohamad, Alvin Yeo, Alex Yam (2015-2020): Low Yen Ling, Zaqy Mohamad, Yee Chia Hsing (2020-2025): Don Wee, Zaqy Mohamad, Low Yen Ling	Succeeded by Jeffrey Siow; Tan See Leng; Zhulkarnain Abdul Rahim; Choo Pei Ling
New constituency	Member of Parliament for Punggol GRC; 2025–present Served alongside: Janil Puthucheary, Yeo Wan Ling, Sun Xueling	Incumbent
Party political offices
Preceded by Khaw Boon Wan	Chairman of the People's Action Party; 2018–2022	Succeeded by Heng Swee Keat
