= Zhulkarnain Abdul Rahim =

Singaporean politician (born 1980)

The Honourable Zhulkarnain Abdul Rahim
- 周凯年 ذو القرنين عبدالرحيم
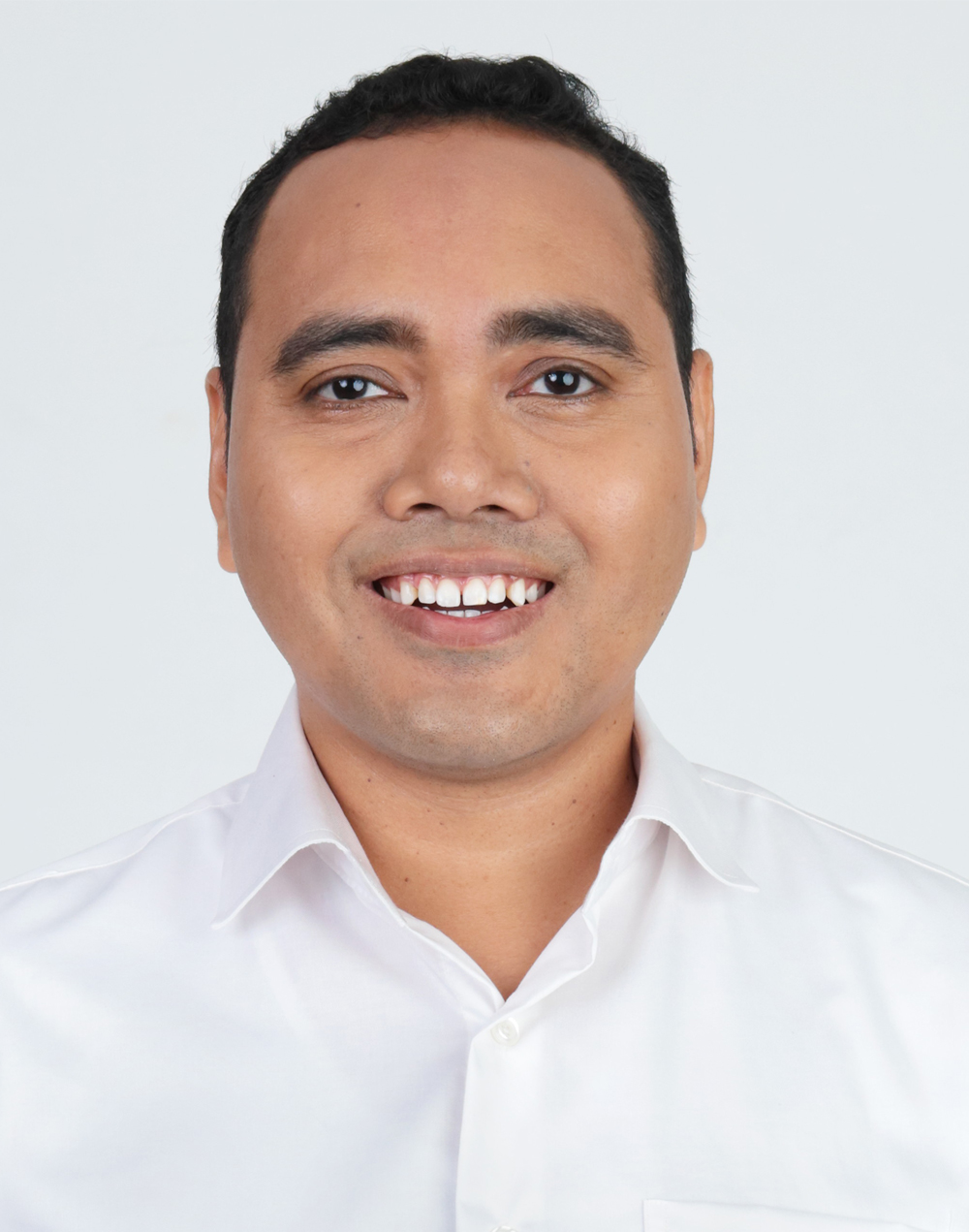
- Official portrait, 2021

Minister of State for Home Affairs
- Incumbent
- Assumed office 27 July 2026
- Prime Minister: Lawrence Wong
- Minister: K. Shanmugam

Minister of State for Foreign Affairs
- Incumbent
- Assumed office 1 Jan 2026 Serving with Gan Siow Huang
- Prime Minister: Lawrence Wong
- Minister: Vivian Balakrishnan

Member of Parliament for Chua Chu Kang GRC
- Incumbent
- Assumed office 10 July 2020
- Preceded by: PAP held
- Majority: 2020: 17,520 (17.28%); 2025: 23,578 (27.20%)

Personal details
- Born: Zhulkarnain bin Abdul Rahim Singapore
- Party: People's Action Party
- Children: 4
- Education: National University of Singapore (LLB); Singapore Management University (LLM)
- Occupation: Politician; lawyer

Zhulkarnain bin Abdul Rahim (born 1980) 周凯年 (ذو القرنين عبدالرحيم) is a Singaporean politician and lawyer who has been serving as Minister of State for Foreign Affairs, and Minister of State for Home Affairs since 27 Jul 2026. As a member of the People's Action Party (PAP), he is a Member of Parliament (MP) for Chua Chu Kang Group Representation Constituency since 2020.

== Early life and education ==
Zhulkarnain grew up with five siblings while his father was the sole breadwinner of the family.

He studied at National Junior College and graduated from National University of Singapore with a Bachelor of Laws degree in 2005 and subsequently completed a Master of Laws degree in Islamic law and finance in 2013 at the Singapore Management University.

== Career ==
Zhulkarnain is a partner at Dentons Rodyk and Davidson. He was named in the Asian Legal Business ALB 40 under 40 2016 List of the brightest young legal minds in the region and a shortlisted finalist in the 2017 Young Lawyer of the Year category of the ALB South East Asia Law Awards. In 2017, he won the JCI Singapore: Ten Outstanding Young Persons of the World Award in the category of Political, Legal and Government Affairs.

=== Political career ===
Zhulkarnain was fielded in the 2020 general election to contest in Chua Chu Kang GRC on the People's Action Party's (PAP) ticket against the Progress Singapore Party. Zhulkarnain's running mates were Gan Kim Yong, Low Yen Ling, and Don Wee. On 11 July 2020, Zhulkarnain was declared an elected Member of Parliament representing Chua Chu Kang GRC in the 14th Parliament after the PAP team in Chua Chu Kang GRC garnered 58.64% of the valid votes. He was then appointed Deputy Chairperson of Home Affairs and Law Government Parliamentary Committee (GPC) in Parliament. On 1 July 2024, Zhulkarnain took over as Chairman of the Home Affairs and Law Government Parliamentary Committee (GPC) from Murali Pillai who became a Minister of State on the same day.

Zhulkarnain was appointed Minister of State in the Ministry of Foreign Affairs and the Ministry of Social and Family Development, effective 1 January 2026, following Prime Minister Lawrence Wong's announcement of his appointment in May 2025. His appointment marked an important milestone in his public service journey, recognising his contributions as a Member of Parliament for Chua Chu Kang GRC and his experience as a senior legal practitioner. He subsequently relinquished his legal practice to take on the responsibilities of public office, bringing his legal expertise, leadership experience and commitment to serving Singaporeans to the Government. In July 2026, he was appointed Minister of State in the Ministry of Home Affairs while retaining his portfolio in the Ministry of Foreign Affairs.

=== Other Appointments ===
Beyond his ministerial responsibilities, he has taken on several key leadership appointments, including serving on the National Translation Committee (NTC) and as Co-Chairperson of its Translation Industry Workgroup (TIWG), where he contributes to strengthening Singapore's translation industry and professional standards. He also serves as Chairman of the Malay Language Council, Singapore since July 2025, and Chairman of the Bulan Bahasa Committee since August 2023, championing the preservation, promotion and development of the Malay language, culture and heritage. In addition, as Chairman of the MUIS Islamic Legacy Planning Workgroup since April 2024, he leads efforts to raise awareness and encourage greater understanding and adoption of Islamic legacy planning among Muslim families in Singapore.

Parliament of Singapore
Preceded by Gan Kim Yong; Low Yen Ling; Zaqy Mohamad; Yee Chia Hsing	Member of Parliament for Chua Chu Kang GRC; 2020 – present Served alongside: (2020 – 2025): Don Wee, Gan Kim Yong, Low Yen Ling (2025 – present): Choo Pei Ling, Jeffrey Siow, Tan See Leng	Incumbent
