= Low Yen Ling =

Singaporean politician (born 1974)

The Honourable Low Yen Ling
- 刘燕玲
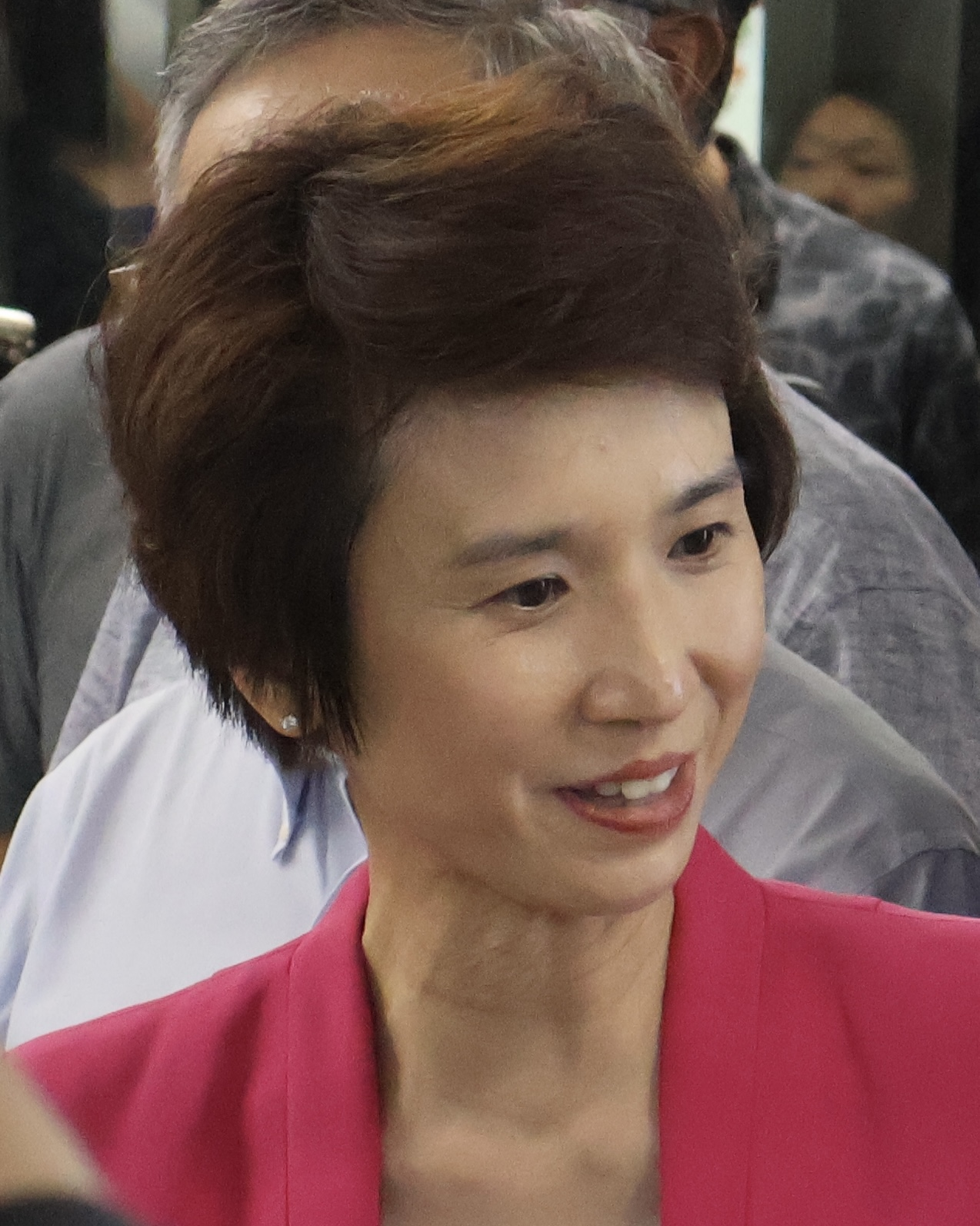
- Low in 2025

Mayor of South West District
- Incumbent
- Assumed office 27 May 2014
- Prime Minister: Lee Hsien Loong; Lawrence Wong
- Preceded by: Amy Khor

Member of Parliament for Bukit Gombak SMC
- Incumbent
- Assumed office 3 May 2025
- Preceded by: Constituency established
- Majority: 12,220 (51.62%)

Member of Parliament for Chua Chu Kang GRC
- In office 7 May 2011 – 15 April 2025
- Preceded by: Constituency established
- Succeeded by: PAP held
- Majority: 2011: 32,825 (22.40%); 2015: 59,271 (53.78%); 2020: 17,520 (17.28%)

Personal details
- Born: 17 August 1974 (age 52) Singapore
- Party: People's Action Party
- Children: 2
- Education: Nanyang Technological University (BBus)

Low Yen Ling (Note: Chinese: 刘燕玲; pinyin: Liú Yànlíng) (born 17 August 1974) is a Singaporean politician who has been serving as Mayor of South West District since 2014, Senior Minister of State for Culture, Community and Youth and Senior Minister of State for Trade and Industry concurrently since 2024. A member of the governing People's Action Party (PAP), she has been the Member of Parliament (MP) for Bukit Gombak Single Member Constituency (SMC) since 2025. She had previously represented the Bukit Gombak division of Chua Chu Kang Group Representation Constituency (GRC) between 2011 and 2025.

Prior to entering politics, Low worked at financial institutions, a start-up venture, and the Economic Development Board (EDB).

She made her political debut in the 2011 general election as part of a five-member PAP team contesting in Chua Chu Kang GRC; they won 61.2% of the vote.

== Education ==
Low was educated at Dunman High School and Temasek Junior College before graduating from the Nanyang Technological University with a Bachelor of Business with second upper honours degree in financial analysis.

== Career ==
Low started her career in the private sector by handling commercial lending accounts for Keppel TatLee Bank and United Overseas Bank. After that, she worked at a start-up, AutoHub Private Limited, which reportedly failed. She then joined the EDB in 2001 and became the director of three divisions. In April 2011, she left the EDB and became Chief Executive Officer of Business China on 1 June 2011.

=== Political career ===
On 4 April, prior to the 2011 general election, Low was introduced as part of the PAP team for the five-member Chua Chu Kang GRC. She became the MP for its Bukit Gombak division after her team defeated the National Solidarity Party (NSP) with 61.2% of the vote. On 1 October 2013, Low was appointed Parliamentary Secretary at the Ministry of Social and Family Development (MSF). She was given an additional appointment as Parliamentary Secretary at the Ministry of Culture, Community and Youth (MCCY) on 1 May 2014. On 27 May 2014, she was appointed Mayor of the South West District and Chairperson of the Mayors' Committee.

During the 2015 general election, Low stood for reelection in Chua Chu Kang GRC, which had been downsized to four MPs; the PAP team won 76.91% of the vote against the People's Power Party (PPP). On 1 October 2015, Low was appointed Parliamentary Secretary at the Ministry of Education (MOE) and Ministry of Trade and Industry (MTI); at the same time, she relinquished her appointments as Parliamentary Secretary at MSF and MCCY.

On 1 May 2017, Low was promoted to Senior Parliamentary Secretary at both MOE and MTI. On 1 May 2018, she relinquished her appointment at MTI to become Senior Parliamentary Secretary at the Ministry of Manpower (MOM) while continuing to serve at the Ministry of Education. Low has served as the Chairman of the Chua Chu Kang Town Council (CCKTC) since 2019. Her team would win with 75% of the vote.

In the 2020 general election, Low stood for reelection in Chua Chu Kang GRC as part of a four-member PAP team; they won 58.64% of the vote against the Progress Singapore Party (PSP). On 27 July 2020, she was promoted to Minister of State and appointed to MTI and MCCY.

In the 2025 general election, Low's Bukit Gombak division was carved out of Chua Chu Kang GRC to become an SMC. She stood for reelection in the new SMC against PSP candidate Harish Pillay, winning 75.81% of the vote.

==== Walkabout harassment allegations by PSP ====
In January 2025, PSP volunteers alleged that PAP volunteers had followed their party walkabout in Chua Chu Kang GRC, starting from an HDB estate in Low's Bukit Gombak division; the PSP lodged a police report regarding the allegations. In a Facebook post, Low counteralleged that the PSP volunteers had started the incident when both teams met during their walkabouts. In her account, among other acts, one PSP volunteer had intimidated and slapped a PAP volunteer twice and taunted another. She would later accuse the PSP of giving a false account after it rebutted her. Initially, she also said that no police report was made by the PAP volunteers; however, it was reported that they had filed one.

== Personal life ==
Low is married with two sons.

== Notes ==
Parliament of Singapore
New constituency	Member of Parliament for Chua Chu Kang GRC; 2011 – 2025; Served alongside: (2011 – 2015): Gan Kim Yong, Zaqy Mohamad, Alvin Yeo, Alex Yam (2015 – 2020): Gan Kim Yong, Zaqy Mohamad, Yee Chia Hsing (2020 – 2025): Don Wee, Gan Kim Yong, Zhulkarnain Abdul Rahim	Succeeded by Jeffrey Siow; Tan See Leng; Zhulkarnain Abdul Rahim; Choo Pei Ling
New constituency	Member of Parliament for Bukit Gombak SMC; 2025 – present	Incumbent
Government offices
Preceded by Amy Khor	Mayor of South West District; 27 May 2014 – present	Incumbent
