= Charles Yeo =

Singaporean lawyer and politician (born 1990)

- 杨耀辉

5th Chairman of the Reform Party
- In office 5 August 2020 – 16 January 2022
- Secretary-General: Kenneth Jeyaretnam
- Preceded by: Andy Zhu
- Succeeded by: Yasmine Valentina (acting)

Personal details
- Born: Charles Yeo Yao Hui; 1990 (age 35–36) Singapore
- Party: Reform Party (2011–2022)
- Education: University of Warwick
- Occupation: Lawyer; politician

Charles Yeo Yao Hui (Chinese: 杨耀辉; pinyin: Yáng Yàohui; born 1990) is a Singaporean lawyer and former politician who served as the chairman of the opposition Reform Party (RP) between 2020 and 2022.

== Education ==
Yeo attended Bukit View Primary School, Victoria School and Anglo-Chinese School (Independent) before graduating from the University of Warwick, where he read law.

== Career ==
=== Political career ===
Yeo became a member of the RP in 2011 and became part of its central executive committee in June 2019.

Yeo was part of the five-member Reform Party team which contested the Ang Mo Kio Group Representation Constituency during the 2020 Singaporean general election, running against the People's Action Party team led by Prime Minister Lee Hsien Loong. His team was defeated, receiving 28.09 percent of the votes.

Yeo gained national prominence following the RP's constituency broadcast for Ang Mo Kio GRC. Due to the absence of other team members, Yeo delivered his party's broadcast in Mandarin on their behalf. His attempt became viral due to his non-fluency and unconventional phraseology in Mandarin, something which sparked many internet memes and drew praise from the Prime Minister's wife Ho Ching.

On 5 August, Jeyaretnam removed both chairman Andy Zhu and treasurer Noraini Yunus from the CEC with Yeo and deputy treasurer Mahaboob Batcha taking their places as chairman and treasurer respectively.

Due to the arrest over alleged offences of criminal breach of trust and forgery in the course of his work, on 12 January 2022, Yeo temporarily relinquished his chairmanship of the party on 15 January 2022.

=== Legal career ===
Yeo was called to the bar in 2016, and worked as a criminal defence lawyer. He was arrested on 12 January 2022 by the Singapore Police Force for alleged offences of criminal breach of trust and forgery. Yeo claimed that the arrest was conducted unprofessionally, and that the charges were "entirely trumped up and false", which the police categorically denied that the arrest was "politically motivated". The arrest was part of an investigation against Whitefield Law Corporation, where Yeo had been working at as a criminal defence lawyer. Four clients of the law firm had reported them, alleging criminal breach of trust and forgery. After the arrest, he appealed to the public to help with his legal bills, and had also launched a non-fungible token as a fundraising mechanism for the legal bills.

Yeo subsequently worked at S K Kumar Law Practice. While on bail in relation to the charges of criminal breach of trust, Yeo was granted travel to Vietnam between 27 July 2022 and 30 July 2022 for a work related matter. Yeo did not return to Singapore and had not surrendered his passport to the investigation officer by 1 August 2022. Yeo also did not turn up to represent a client in trial on 1 August 2022. The Singapore police issued a gazette to arrest Yeo for breaching the conditions of his bail. The Singapore courts would later approve an arrest warrant requested by the prosecution on 2 August 2022. In November 2022, he was convicted of contempt of court by scandalising the juduciary. As of 23 November 2024, an extradition hearing is underway in United Kingdom, with Singapore seeking to extradite him on "an offence of abetment of cheating" while Yeo is claiming political asylum.

In November 2025, Yeo was disbarred after the Court of Three Judges determined that he was "thoroughly unfit to wear the mantle of membership in this venerable profession of law". Yeo was supposed to log into the Zoom courtroom for his 11 September hearing, but instead of appearing, he declared on Instagram that he had no intention of engaging with the "kangaroo courts of Singapore" and that he would "spit" on them.
