= Chua Chu Kang Group Representation Constituency =

Electoral division in Singapore

Coordinates: 1.3570551°N 103.7529097°E

Chua Chu Kang
- Kawasan Undi Perwakilan Berkumpulan Chua Chu Kang 蔡厝港集选区 சுவா சூ காங் குழுப் பிரதிநிதித்துவத் தொகுதி
- Group Representation constituency for the Parliament of Singapore
- Region: West Region, Singapore
- Electorate: 93,522

Current constituency
- Created: 2011; 15 years ago
- Seats: 4
- Party: People's Action Party
- Members: Choo Pei Ling; Jeffrey Siow; Tan See Leng; Zhulkarnain Abdul Rahim
- Town Council: Chua Chu Kang
- Created from: Hong Kah GRC; Chua Chu Kang SMC

The Chua Chu Kang Group Representation Constituency is a four-member group representation constituency (GRC) located in western Singapore. It has four divisions: Brickland–Tengah, Chua Chu Kang, Keat Hong and Tengah, managed by Chua Chu Kang Town Council. The current Members of Parliament (MPs) for the constituency are Choo Pei Ling, Minister of Transport and Second Minister for Finance Jeffrey Siow ,Minister for Energy, Trade and Industry (Energy and Industry) Tan See Leng and Zhulkarnain Abdul Rahim from the governing People's Action Party (PAP).

== History ==
=== Creation (2011) ===
Prior to the 2011 general election, Hong Kah GRC and Chua Chu Kang Single Member Constituency (SMC) were abolished; the Hong Kah North division of Hong Kah GRC became Hong Kah North SMC, while the remainder was merged with the entirety of Chua Chu Kang SMC to become Chua Chu Kang GRC. The PAP defeated the National Solidarity Party (NSP) with 61.2% of the vote.

=== Downsizing (2015) ===
During the 2015 general election, Chua Chu Kang GRC lost a seat, becoming a four-member GRC, after its Yew Tee division was transferred to the newly created Marsiling–Yew Tee GRC. The PAP defeated the People's Power Party (PPP) with 76.91% of the vote.

=== First PSP contest (2020) ===
In the 2020 general election, Chua Chu Kang GRC lost territory to Hong Kah North SMC and West Coast GRC. The PAP defeated the Progress Singapore Party (PSP) with a decreased 58.64% of the vote.

=== Major boundary changes and second PSP contest (2025) ===
Prior to the 2025 general election, Hong Kah North SMC was abolished; its Tengah estates were transferred to Chua Chu Kang GRC. At the same time, the Bukit Gombak and Hillview estates in the GRC were carved out to become the newly created Bukit Gombak SMC.

On Nomination Day, Gan Kim Yong, the Deputy Prime Minister and previous anchor minister for Chua Chu Kang GRC, was nominated at the last minute to lead the PAP team for the newly created Punggol GRC against that of the Workers' Party (WP). He was replaced by Tan See Leng, the Minister for Manpower, who had originally been positioned in Marine Parade–Braddell Heights GRC.

The PAP defeated the PSP with 63.6% of the vote.

== Members of Parliament ==
Divisions or wards of Chua Chu Kang GRC as of the 2025 general election:
1 Brickland
2 Chua Chu Kang
3 Keat Hong
4 Tengah

| Year | Division | Members of Parliament | Party |
|---|---|---|---|
Formation
| 2011 | Chua Chu Kang; Bukit Gombak; Keat Hong; Nanyang; Yew Tee | Gan Kim Yong; Low Yen Ling; Zaqy Mohamad; Alvin Yeo; Alex Yam | PAP |
| 2015 | Chua Chu Kang; Bukit Gombak; Keat Hong; Nanyang | Gan Kim Yong; Low Yen Ling; Zaqy Mohamad; Yee Chia Hsing | PAP |
| 2020 | Brickland; Chua Chu Kang; Bukit Gombak; Keat Hong | Don Wee; Gan Kim Yong; Low Yen Ling; Zhulkarnain Abdul Rahim | PAP |
| 2025 | Brickland; Chua Chu Kang; Keat Hong; Tengah | Jeffrey Siow; Tan See Leng; Zhulkarnain Abdul Rahim; Choo Pei Ling | PAP |

== Electoral results ==
Note: The Elections Department does not include rejected votes when calculating the vote shares of candidates. Hence, all candidates' vote shares will total to 100% at any given election (may not appear so in multi-way contests due to rounding).

=== Elections in 2010s ===
General Election 2011
| Party | Candidate | Votes | % |
|---|---|---|---|
| PAP | Alex Yam Alvin Yeo Low Yen Ling Gan Kim Yong Zaqy Mohamad | 89,710 | 61.20 |
| NSP | Hazel Poa Nor Lella Mardiiiah Mohamed Jeisilan Sivalingam Sebastian Teo Tony Tan | 56,885 | 38.80 |
| Majority | | 32,825 | 22.40 |
| Total valid votes | | 146,595 | 97.95 |
| Rejected ballots | | 3,064 | 2.05 |
| Turnout | | 149,659 | 94.33 |
| Registered electors | | 158,648 | |
| PAP win (new seat) | | | |

General Election 2015
| Party | Candidate | Votes | % | ±% |
|---|---|---|---|---|
| PAP | Gan Kim Yong Low Yen Ling Yee Chia Hsing Zaqy Mohamad | 84,850 | 76.91 | ▲15.71 |
| PPP | Goh Meng Seng Low Wai Choo Lee Tze Shih Syafarin Sarif | 25,475 | 23.09 | N/A |
| Majority | | 59,271 | 53.82 | ▲31.42 |
| Total valid votes | | 110,325 | 97.40 | ▼0.55 |
| Rejected ballots | | 2,949 | 2.60 | ▲0.55 |
| Turnout | | 113,274 | 94.45 | ▲0.12 |
| Registered electors | | 119,931 | | ▼24.40 |
| PAP hold | | Swing | ▲15.71 | |

=== Elections in 2020s ===
General Election 2020
| Party | Candidate | Votes | % | ±% |
|---|---|---|---|---|
| PAP | Don Wee Gan Kim Yong Low Yen Ling Zhulkarnain Abdul Rahim | 59,554 | 58.64 | ▼18.27 |
| PSP | Abdul Rahman Mohamad Choo Shaun Ming Francis Yuen Tan Meng Wah | 42,012 | 41.36 | N/A |
| Majority | | 17,542 | 17.28 | ▼36.54 |
| Total valid votes | | 101,566 | 98.63 | ▲1.23 |
| Rejected ballots | | 1,410 | 1.37 | ▼1.23 |
| Turnout | | 102,976 | 96.57 | ▲2.13 |
| Registered electors | | 106,632 | | ▼11.09 |
| PAP hold | | Swing | ▼18.27 | |

General Election 2025
| Party | Candidate | Votes | % | ±% |
|---|---|---|---|---|
| PAP | Choo Pei Ling Jeffrey Siow Tan See Leng Zhulkarnain Abdul Rahim | 55,140 | 63.60 | ▲4.96 |
| PSP | A'bas Kasmani Lawrence Pek S. Nallakaruppan Wendy Low | 31,562 | 36.40 | ▼4.96 |
| Majority | | 23,578 | 27.20 | ▲9.92 |
| Total valid votes | | 86,702 | 98.64 | ▲0.01 |
| Rejected ballots | | 1,191 | 1.36 | ▼0.01 |
| Turnout | | 87,893 | 93.98 | ▼2.59 |
| Registered electors | | 93,522 | | ▼12.29 |
| PAP hold | | Swing | ▲4.96 | |

== See also ==
- Chua Chu Kang SMC
