= Tan See Leng =

Singaporean politician (born 1964)

The Honourable Tan See Leng
- 陈诗龙
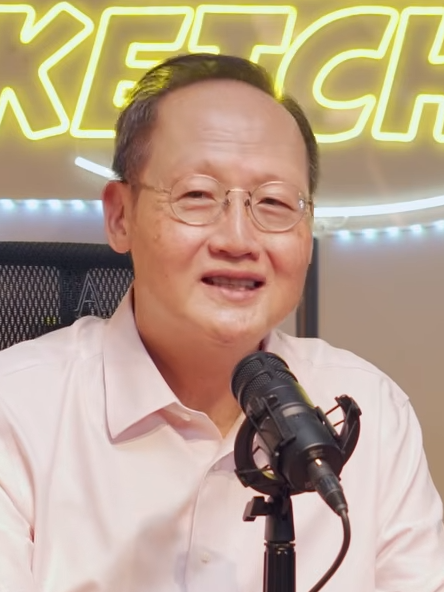
- Tan in 2026

Minister for Energy, Trade and Industry (Energy and Industry)
- Incumbent
- Assumed office 27 July 2026 Serving with Gan Kim Yong (Trade)
- Prime Minister: Lawrence Wong
- Preceded by: Gan Kim Yong (as Minister for Trade and Industry)

Minister for Manpower
- In office 15 May 2021 – 27 July 2026
- Prime Minister: Lee Hsien Loong; Lawrence Wong
- Preceded by: Josephine Teo
- Succeeded by: Jasmin Lau (Acting)

Second Minister for Trade and Industry
- In office 27 July 2020 – 23 May 2025
- Prime Minister: Lee Hsien Loong; Lawrence Wong
- Minister: Chan Chun Sing (2020–2021); Gan Kim Yong (2021–)
- Preceded by: S. Iswaran (2015)
- Succeeded by: Vacant

Minister in the Prime Minister's Office
- In office 27 July 2020 – 14 May 2021 Serving with Indranee Rajah and Maliki Osman
- Prime Minister: Lee Hsien Loong
- Preceded by: Ng Chee Meng

Second Minister for Manpower
- In office 27 July 2020 – 14 May 2021
- Prime Minister: Lee Hsien Loong
- Minister: Josephine Teo
- Preceded by: Josephine Teo (2018)

Member of the Singapore Parliament for Chua Chu Kang GRC
- Incumbent
- Assumed office 4 May 2025
- Preceded by: PAP held
- Majority: 23,578 (27.20%)

Member of the Singapore Parliament for Marine Parade GRC
- In office 10 July 2020 – 15 April 2025
- Preceded by: PAP held
- Succeeded by: Constituency abolished
- Majority: 20,143 (15.52%)

Personal details
- Born: 24 December 1964 (age 61) Singapore
- Party: People's Action Party
- Children: 3
- Education: National University of Singapore (MBBS, MMed); University of Chicago Booth School of Business (MBA)
- Occupation: Politician; medical practitioner

Tan See Leng (Note: Chinese: 陈诗龙; Pe̍h-ōe-jī: Tân Si-lêng; pinyin: Chén Shīlóng) (born 24 December 1964) is a Singaporean politician and former medical practitioner who has been serving as the Minister for Energy, Trade and Industry (Energy and Industry) since 2026. A member of the People's Action Party (PAP), he has been a Member of Parliament (MP) for Chua Chu Kang Group Representation Constituency (GRC) since 2025. He was the Minister for Manpower from 2021 to 2026 and MP for Marine Parade GRC from 2020 to 2025.

Before entering politics, Tan was a medical practitioner by profession. He founded Healthway Medical Group and had served in top positions in Parkway Holdings, Parkway Pantai and IHH Healthcare.

He made his political debut in the 2020 general election as part of a five-member PAP team and won about 57% of the vote in Marine Parade GRC.

On 22 July 2026, Tan was appointed Minister of Enery, Trade and Industry alongside Gan Kim Yong, effective 27 July, in a cabinet reshuffle by Prime Minister Lawrence Wong.

== Early life and education ==
Tan was born to Teochews in Singapore in 1964. He attended Monk's Hill Primary School and Monk's Hill Secondary School. He received a Promsho scholarship to study the humanities at Hwa Chong Junior College. But in his first year at JC, his mother fell seriously ill and went into a coma. This led to his decision to switch from the humanities programme. He studied at the National Junior College before graduating from the Faculty of Medicine at the National University of Singapore in 1988 with a Bachelor of Medicine, Bachelor of Surgery (MBBS).

While in National Junior College, he joined the choir as part of his Co-Curricular Activity (CCA).

Tan funded his university education all by himself, with an annual school fee of S$3,000, by tutoring junior college students in subjects like mathematics, biology, physics and chemistry. With up to eight students at a time, he earned about S$800 to S$1,000 per month.

He subsequently went on to complete a Master of Medicine degree in family medicine at the National University of Singapore in 1998. In 2003, he was awarded the Fellow of College of Family Physicians by the College of Family Physicians Singapore.

In 2004, he obtained a Master of Business Administration degree from the University of Chicago Booth School of Business.

In 2014, he became a Fellow of the Academy of Medicine Singapore.

== Career ==
In 1992, at the age of 27, Tan founded Healthway Medical Group with a group of friends, through a bank loan of S$90,000 and an initial capital investment of S$5,000 from each of the initial stakeholders. As co-founder and chairman of the company, he grew the group to become the second largest private primary care group in Singapore. In 2004, he successfully divested the group to British United Provident Association Healthcare.

In 2004, Tan joined Parkway Holdings as the chief operating officer of Mount Elizabeth Hospital and was eventually promoted to as the executive director of Pantai Holdings, chief executive officer of Pantai Hospitals Division and the head of Malaysia operating division of Parkway until 2008.

From 2010 to 2019, Tan was the group chief executive officer and managing director of Parkway Holdings and Parkway Pantai Limited. From 2014 to 2019, he was also the chief executive officer and managing director of IHH Healthcare BHD. During his tenures, some of his contributions included delisting Parkway Holdings in 2010 and relisting IHH Healthcare in 2012 into one of the largest initial public offerings in the world in 2012, expanding and growing the group from 15 hospitals in 2009 to 84 hospitals as of the end of 2019, leading the mergers and acquisitions of Acibadem Healthcare (Turkey), Fortis Healthcare (India), and multiple hospitals across Asia. Under his leadership, IHH Healthcare Berhad has won multiple awards, including the Best Managed and Best Overall Corporate Governance Poll awards by Asiamoney in 2016.

In 2019, he retired from the position of group chief executive officer and managing director of Parkway Holdings and Parkway Pantai Limited.

Over the years, Tan has held numerous ministerial advisory and medical committee appointments. For instance, since 2009, he has been a member of the board of trustees of the College of Family Physicians Singapore (CFPS). He also served in various capacities with CFPS Holdings Pte Ltd, including as its chairman from 2008 to 2010 and vice president from 2011 to 2013. In November 2013, he was appointed by the Ministry of Health as a member of the MediShield Life review committee.

Moreover, he has maintained active involvement in academia through board memberships and appointments. From 2011 to 2019, he was adjunct assistant professor of Duke-NUS Graduate Medical School Singapore, Office of Education. He has also sat on the advisory board of Lee Kong Chian School of Business at Singapore Management University.

Apart from the medical field, he has also contributed to the business scene. In 2012, Tan was appointed a council member of the Singapore-Guangdong Collaboration Council. The council aims to deepen Singapore's engagement with China's Guangdong province and benefit Singapore businesses through joint exploration of new opportunities in the region.

== Political career ==
Tan was fielded in the 2020 general election to succeed former prime minister Goh Chok Tong who retired from politics, as part of a five-member PAP team led by Speaker Tan Chuan-Jin contesting in Marine Parade GRC and won. Thereafter, he was elected as the Member of Parliament (MP) representing the Marine Parade division of Marine Parade GRC. Upon his team's electoral victory, Tan was appointed second minister for manpower and second minister for trade and industry concurrently on 27 July 2020.

On 15 May 2021, Tan succeeded Josephine Teo as Minister for Manpower while holding onto his portfolio as second minister for trade and industry.

In response to the questions filed by six MPs, during a parliamentary debate on 3 October 2022, on how the foreign workforce was complementing the local talent pipeline and how locals were getting fair consideration for jobs, Tan said that it is not a zero-sum game and that bringing in global talents create jobs for locals.

Despite the PAP's earlier announcement that Tan would be the anchor minister for Marine Parade-Braddell Heights GRC in the 2025 general election, on Nomination Day on 23 April 2025, Tan was fielded as a candidate for Chua Chu Kang GRC. In response to questions about the move, he stated that "I don't think I've ever abandoned Marine Parade. It was a walkover, it was a walkover. It was a walkover. I've said it three times", and further explained that accordingly he had decided to "stand up when called upon to go to anywhere that the party and the country think they need me to go".

On 23 May 2025, Tan was appointed as Minister-in-Charge of Energy and Science and Technology in the Ministry of Trade and Industry. On 22 July 2026, he was appointed to be Minister of Energy, Trade and Industry alongside Gan Kim Yong, effective 27 July, in a cabinet reshuffle by Prime Minister Lawrence Wong.

== Issues ==
=== Cantonese film quote in Parliament ===
On 7 March 2025, during the Singapore Parliament's Appropriations Committee's summary of the Ministry of Manpower's expenditure budget debate, Leong Mun Wai, the Non-constituency Member of Parliament from Progress Singapore Party, questioned the lack of transparency in the official employment rate data, including the data's failure to distinguish between "native-born" and "foreign" Singapore citizens, and the authorities' "ignorance of the impact of foreigners obtaining local permanent residency on the relevant statistics." Tan, as Minister of Manpower, attempted to explain several times which Leong remained unsatisfied with his answers. Tan read Andy Lau's line from the movie Jiang Hu in Cantonese: "Speak, but you don't listen; listen, but you don't understand; understand, but you don't do; do, but you do it wrong; do it wrong, but you don't admit it; admit it, but you don't change; change, but you're not convinced; so what do you want?" The quote drew laughter in the Parliament.

The incident attracted attention from both local and Hong Kong media. Many Singaporeans who understood Cantonese felt that Tan showed contempt for Leong and had a condescending attitude. Some reasoned that Cantonese is not an official language, arguing that Tan's remarks excluded ethnic minorities. This sparked a debate about the use of non-Mandarin Chinese varieties in public. Leong later responded in Cantonese on his social media, saying that Tan still had not provided the data he requested. "You said nothing, and you've gone on and on. Of course, I have to keep asking. He hasn't answered me, and now he's complaining. It's no wonder, the minister is so high and mighty. How could he understand the difficulties that the normal people face in life?"

=== Good class bungalow transactions ===
On 16 December 2024, Tan announced that he was initiating legal action against various media outlets, including Bloomberg, in respect of an article about good class bungalow transactions in Singapore mentioning property transactions involving K. Shanmugam and Tan. Shanmugam and Tan both alleged that the article was libellous. In March 2026, Terry Xu of The Online Citizen was ordered to pay Shanmugam and Tan, S$210,000 each for defaming them in an article about the transactions. On 7 April 2026, the defamation trial against Bloomberg started.

== Personal life ==
Tan is married with three children. He enjoys singing and was previously a member of the school choir.

== Notes ==
Political offices
Preceded by Ng Chee Meng	Minister in the Prime Minister’s Office; 2020 – 2021; Served alongside: Indranee Rajah, Maliki Osman	Incumbent
Preceded by Josephine Teo	Minister for Manpower; 2021 – 2026	Succeeded by Jasmin Lau
Parliament of Singapore
Preceded by Seah Kian Peng; Fatimah Lateef; Edwin Tong; Tan Chuan-Jin; Goh Chok Tong	Member of Parliament for Marine Parade GRC; 2020–2025; Served alongside: Seah Kian Peng, Fahmi Aliman, Edwin Tong, Tan Chuan-Jin	GRC abolished
Preceded by Zhulkarnain Abdul Rahim; Don Wee; Gan Kim Yong; Low Yen Ling	Member of Parliament for Chua Chu Kang GRC; 2025–present Served alongside: (2025–present): Choo Pei Ling, Zhulkarnain Abdul Rahim, Jeffrey Siow	Incumbent
