= Ministry of Energy, Trade and Industry =

Singapore Ministry that directs energy, trade and industry policies

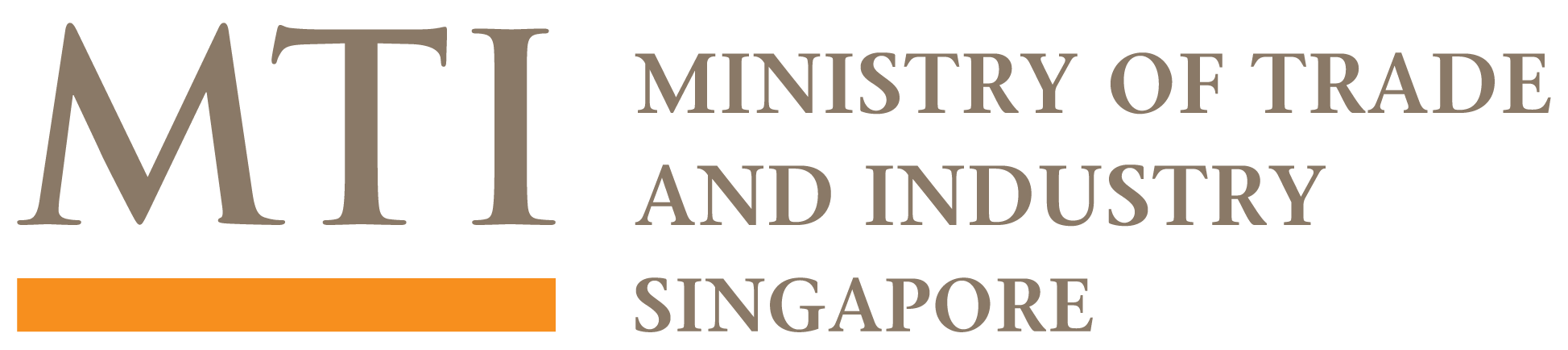

Agency overview
- Formed: 15 March 1979; 47 years ago
- Jurisdiction: Government of Singapore
- Headquarters: 100 High Street, #09–01 (The Treasury), Singapore 179434
- Motto: A Global City of Business Excellence
- Employees: 3,134 (2018)
- Annual budget: ▼ S$4.40 billion (2019)
- Ministers responsible: Gan Kim Yong, Deputy Prime Minister and Minister (Trade); Tan See Leng, Minister (Energy and Industry); Grace Fu, Minister-in-charge of Trade Relations; Low Yen Ling, Senior Minister of State; Foo Cexiang, Minister of State; Gan Siow Huang, Minister of State
- Agency executives: Beh Swan Gin, Permanent Secretary; Augustin Lee, Permanent Secretary (Energy and Trade); Jane Lim, Deputy Secretary (Trade and International Economic Relations); Keith Tan, Deputy Secretary (Energy and Carbon) Deputy Secretary (Industry); Philomena Aw, Deputy Secretary (Industry) (designate)
- Child agencies: Agency for Science, Technology and Research; Competition and Consumer Commission of Singapore; Economic Development Board; Energy Market Authority; Enterprise Singapore; Hotel Licensing Board; JTC Corporation; Sentosa Development Corporation; Singapore Tourism Board; National Space Agency of Singapore
- Website: www.meti.gov.sg
- Agency ID: T08GA0022C

The Ministry of Energy, Trade and Industry (METI) is a ministry of the government of Singapore responsible for the formulation and implementation of policies related to the development of business, energy trade and industry in Singapore. The ministry is renamed from Ministry of Trade and Industry since 1 October 2026.

== Organisational structure ==
9 statutory boards and two government department are under the Ministry's purview.

The nine Statutory Boards comprises:

- Agency for Science, Technology and Research (A*STAR),
- Economic Development Board (EDB),
- Enterprise Singapore,
- Jurong Town Corporation (JTC),
- Singapore Tourism Board (STB),
- Competition and Consumer Commission of Singapore (CCCS),
- Energy Market Authority (EMA),
- Hotels Licensing Board (HLB), and
- Sentosa Development Corporation (SDC).

The government departments are Singapore Department of Statistics (DOS) and the National Space Agency of Singapore (NSAS).

== List of ministers ==
The Ministry is headed by the Minister for Trade and Industry, who is appointed as part of the Cabinet of Singapore. The incumbent Minister is Gan Kim Yong, an MP for Punggol GRC and Tan See Leng, an MP for Chua Chu Kang GRC.

=== Minister for Science and Technology (1968–1981) ===
Minister	Took office	Left office	Party	Cabinet
Toh Chin Chye; MP for Rochore (1921–2012)	15 April 1968	1 June 1975	PAP	Lee K. III
Toh Chin Chye; MP for Rochore (1921–2012)	15 April 1968	1 June 1975	PAP	Lee K. IV
Lee Chiaw Meng; MP for Farrer Park (1937–2001)	2 June 1975	30 December 1976	PAP	Lee K. IV
Jek Yeun Thong; MP for Queenstown (1930–2018)	31 December 1976	25 September 1977	PAP	Lee K. V
E. W. Barker; MP for Tanglin (1920–2001)	26 September 1977	1 April 1981	PAP	Lee K. V
E. W. Barker; MP for Tanglin (1920–2001)	26 September 1977	1 April 1981	PAP	Lee K. VI

=== Minister for Trade and Industry (1979–2015) ===
Minister	Took office	Left office	Party	Cabinet
Goh Chok Tong; MP for Marine Parade (born 1941)	15 March 1979	31 May 1981	PAP	Lee K. V
Goh Chok Tong; MP for Marine Parade (born 1941)	15 March 1979	31 May 1981	PAP	Lee K. VI
Tony Tan; MP for Sembawang (born 1940)	1 June 1981	1 January 1985	PAP	Lee K. VI
Richard Hu; MP for Kreta Ayer (1926–2023)	2 January 1985	6 May 1985	PAP	Lee K. VII
Tony Tan; MP for Sembawang (born 1940)	7 May 1985	17 February 1986	PAP	Lee K. VII
Lee Hsien Loong; MP for Teck Ghee SMC (until 1991) and Ang Mo Kio GRC (from 1991) (born 1952)	18 February 1986	6 December 1992	PAP	Lee K. VII
Lee Hsien Loong; MP for Teck Ghee SMC (until 1991) and Ang Mo Kio GRC (from 1991) (born 1952)	18 February 1986	6 December 1992	PAP	Lee K. VIII
Lee Hsien Loong; MP for Teck Ghee SMC (until 1991) and Ang Mo Kio GRC (from 1991) (born 1952)	18 February 1986	6 December 1992	PAP	Goh I
Lee Hsien Loong; MP for Teck Ghee SMC (until 1991) and Ang Mo Kio GRC (from 1991) (born 1952)	18 February 1986	6 December 1992	PAP	Goh II
S. Dhanabalan; MP for Toa Payoh GRC (born 1937)	7 December 1992	31 December 1993	PAP	Goh II
Yeo Cheow Tong; MP for Hong Kah GRC (born 1947)	1 January 1994	24 January 1997	PAP	Goh II
Lee Yock Suan; MP for Cheng San GRC (born 1946)	25 January 1997	2 June 1999	PAP	Goh III
George Yeo; MP for Aljunied GRC (born 1954)	3 June 1999	11 August 2004	PAP	Goh III
George Yeo; MP for Aljunied GRC (born 1954)	3 June 1999	11 August 2004	PAP	Goh IV
Lim Hng Kiang; MP for West Coast GRC (born 1954)	12 August 2004	30 September 2015	PAP	Lee H. I
Lim Hng Kiang; MP for West Coast GRC (born 1954)	12 August 2004	30 September 2015	PAP	Lee H. II
Lim Hng Kiang; MP for West Coast GRC (born 1954)	12 August 2004	30 September 2015	PAP	Lee H. III

=== Minister for Trade and Industry (Trade) (2015–2018) ===
Minister	Took office	Left office	Party	Cabinet
Lim Hng Kiang; MP for West Coast GRC (born 1954)	1 October 2015	30 April 2018	PAP	Lee H. IV

=== Minister for Trade and Industry (Industry) (2015–2018) ===
Minister	Took office	Left office	Party	Cabinet
S. Iswaran; MP for West Coast GRC (born 1962)	1 October 2015	30 April 2018	PAP	Lee H. IV

=== Minister for Trade and Industry (2018–2026) ===
Minister	Took office	Left office	Party	Cabinet
Chan Chun Sing; MP for Tanjong Pagar GRC (born 1969)	1 May 2018	14 May 2021	PAP	Lee H. IV
Chan Chun Sing; MP for Tanjong Pagar GRC (born 1969)	1 May 2018	14 May 2021	PAP	Lee H. V
Gan Kim Yong; MP for Chua Chu Kang GRC (until 2025) and Punggol GRC (from 2025) (born 1959)	15 May 2021	27 July 2026	PAP	Lee H. V
Gan Kim Yong; MP for Chua Chu Kang GRC (until 2025) and Punggol GRC (from 2025) (born 1959)	15 May 2021	27 July 2026	PAP	Wong I
Gan Kim Yong; MP for Chua Chu Kang GRC (until 2025) and Punggol GRC (from 2025) (born 1959)	15 May 2021	27 July 2026	PAP	Wong II

=== Minister for Trade and Industry (Trade) (2026–present) ===
Minister	Took office	Left office	Party	Cabinet
Gan Kim Yong; MP for Punggol GRC (born 1959)	27 July 2026	Incumbent	PAP	Wong II

=== Minister for Trade and Industry (Energy and Industry) (2026–present) ===
Minister	Took office	Left office	Party	Cabinet
Tan See Leng; MP for Chua Chu Kang GRC (born 1964)	27 July 2026	Incumbent	PAP	Wong II
