= Don Wee =

Singaporean politician

- 黄文鸿
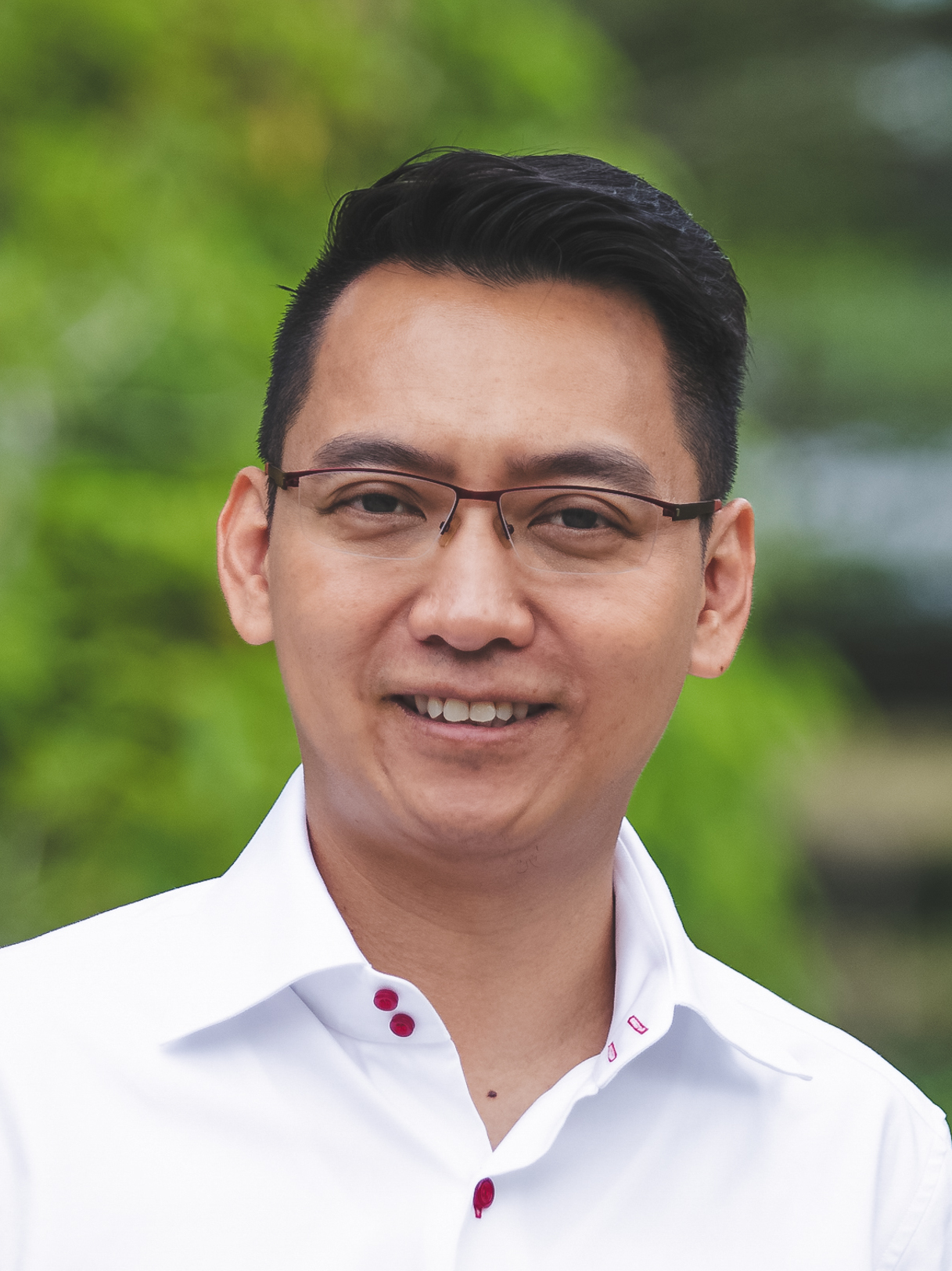
- Wee in 2020

Member of Parliament for Chua Chu Kang GRC
- In office 10 July 2020 – 15 April 2025
- Preceded by: Constituency established
- Succeeded by: PAP held
- Majority: 17,520 (17.28%)

Personal details
- Born: 1976 (age 49–50) Singapore
- Party: People's Action Party
- Education: Nanyang Technological University (MBA); National University of Singapore (MPA); Harvard University
- Occupation: Politician; accountant

Don Wee Boon Hong (Chinese: 黄文鸿; pinyin: Huáng Wénhóng; born 1976) is a Singaporean accountant and former politician. A member of the governing People's Action Party (PAP), he has been the Member of Parliament (MP) representing the Brickland division of Chua Chu Kang Group Representation Constituency between 2020 to 2025.

== Education ==
Wee attended Nan Hua High School and Ngee Ann Polytechnic. After completing his National Service, Wee completed a Bachelor of Accountancy degree as a part-time student.

He subsequently went on to complete a Master of Business Administration degree at the Nanyang Technological University and a Master of Public Administration degree at the National University of Singapore's Lee Kuan Yew School of Public Policy.

Wee had also taken an executive education programme at Harvard University's John F. Kennedy School of Government.

== Career ==
Wee joined a local bank as a non-executive staff after completing his full-time National Service as an officer in the Singapore Army's Armoured Regiment. In 2020, Wee was reportedly a senior vice president at United Overseas Bank. Wee is also a member of the Institute of Mental Health's visitors' board. Wee is also serving in Nan Hua High School's school advisory committee and doing pro bono work with the Office of the Public Guardian. Wee was elected into the Council of the Institute of Singapore Chartered Accountants in May 2019. Wee had worked at HSBC, OCBC Bank, Citibank and United Overseas Bank between 1998 and 2018.

He is a Chartered Accountant (Singapore), Fellow Certified Practising Accountant (CPA Australia) and ASEAN Chartered Professional Accountant. He also completed the Chartered Valuer and Appraiser Programme in 2018.

=== Politics ===
Wee was fielded in the 2020 general election to contest in Chua Chu Kang GRC on the People's Action Party's (PAP) ticket against the Progress Singapore Party. Wee's running mates were Gan Kim Yong, Low Yen Ling and Zhulkarnain Abdul Rahim. On 11 July 2020, Wee was declared an elected Member of Parliament representing Chua Chu Kang GRC in the 14th Parliament after the PAP team in Chua Chu Kang GRC garnered 58.64% of the valid votes.

On 14 April 2025, it was announced that Wee will not contest the 2025 general election.

Parliament of Singapore
| New constituency | Member of Parliament for Chua Chu Kang GRC; 2020 – 2025 | Succeeded by Jeffrey Siow |
