= Resignation of Raeesah Khan =

2021 resignation of a Singaporean legislator

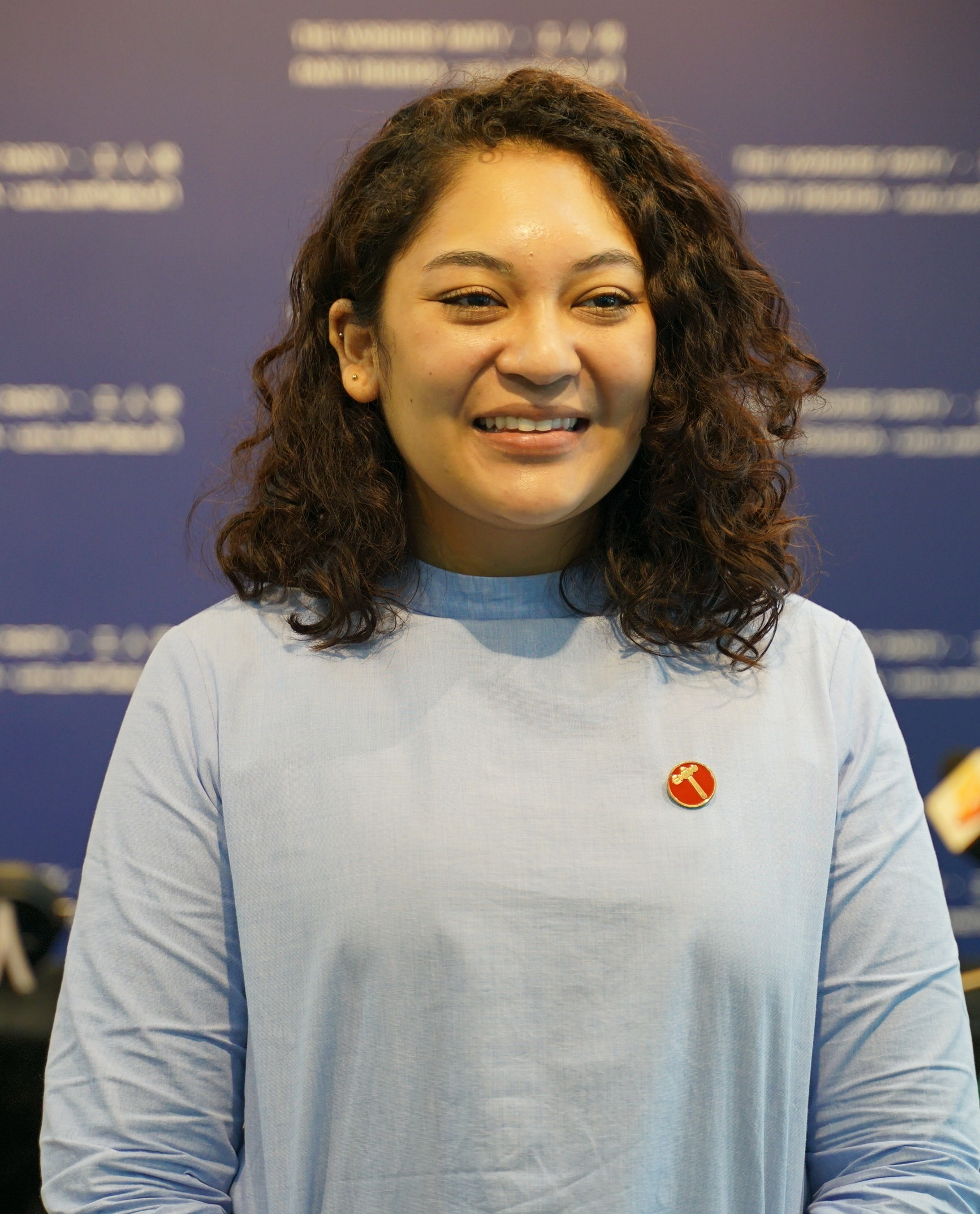
Raeesah at a press conference in 2020

In August 2021, Singaporean Member of Parliament (MP) Raeesah Khan falsely alleged that a police officer inappropriately commented about a rape victim she had been accompanying to make a police report. She repeated the account on 4 October; citing confidentiality concerns, she did not reveal additional details when prompted to do so by government ministers and the police.

Raeesah admitted on 1 November that she had lied and resigned from the Workers' Party (WP) on 30 November, thereby losing her seat in Parliament. In her admission, she said that she had heard of the account from a support group for women victims of sexual assault, and did not have the victim's consent to share it in Parliament. The Committee of Privileges proposed that she be fined S$35,000: $25,000 for first making the allegation, and $10,000 for repeating it. Further investigations implicated the WP leadership in the case; vice-chairperson Faisal Manap was formally advised by the police to respect the Parliament (Privileges, Immunities and Powers) Act, and leader Pritam Singh was fined $7,000 on each of two counts of lying to Parliament. Owing to his conviction, Singh was removed in January 2026 by Prime Minister Lawrence Wong as the Leader of the Opposition, after Leader of the House Indranee Rajah proposed a successful motion to declare him unsuitable for the position. In August of the same year, he was disbarred by the Court of Three Judges.

== Background ==
On 3 August 2021, Raeesah, an MP for Sengkang Group Representation Constituency (GRC), made an allegation against the Singapore Police Force (SPF) during a parliamentary debate on empowering women. She alleged that, in 2018, a police officer made inappropriate comments about the attire and alcohol consumption of a 25-year-old rape victim, whom she had accompanied to make a police report. She also recommended that the sensitivity of investigations be increased. Desmond Tan, Minister of State for Home Affairs, responded, "We take any form of questions raised about how the police have handled or mishandled this case very seriously, and it should be investigated." When asked for details, Raeesah declined, saying that she did not wish to re-traumatise the victim and that what she had said was not an isolated case. She also agreed to submit a parliamentary question about the issue, saying that she had been unsuccessful in contacting the victim after the incident and would communicate directly with the Ministry of Home Affairs in a similar future situation.

On 4 October, K. Shanmugam, Minister for Law and Home Affairs, stated that the police had not found any cases that fit Raeesah's description after checking its records and requested that she elaborate on the allegation. In response, Raeesah reaffirmed her statement while declining to reveal any further details – including the police station they went to – citing confidentiality concerns. On 20 October, the police said that a search had not managed to identify the case in question, and that she had not responded to their requests to provide more details about the case.

On 1 November, Raeesah admitted that she had lied about the alleged incident in Parliament. She did not accompany the victim to make a police report, and had heard about the incident from a support group for women victims of sexual assault. The victim also had not allowed her to share the incident in Parliament. In her admission, she said that she herself had been sexually assaulted at 18 while studying abroad. Indranee Rajah, the Leader of the House, made an official complaint against her for violating parliamentary privilege, and requested that it be referred to the Committee of Privileges (COP).

The following day, the Workers' Party (WP), to which Raeesah belonged, said that it had approved the formation of a separate disciplinary panel to investigate Raeesah's conduct, comprising party leader Pritam Singh, vice-chairperson Faisal Manap, and chairperson Sylvia Lim. On 26 November, the Office of the Clerk of Parliament announced that the COP had started working on the complaint against her.

== Resignation ==
On 30 November 2021, Raeesah resigned from the WP, and hence lost her parliamentary seat, following the probe over her admission of lying. Despite the resignation, the COP announced that it would continue its investigation.

Two days later, Singh announced at a press conference that, despite having known in the week after her speech that her allegation was false, the WP leadership allowed Raeesah to "clarify herself" in Parliament. Such a statement was supposed to be made in September, but a shingles episode obstructed it; upon her return to Parliament on 4 October, she instead repeated the allegation. He said that, before Raeesah's resignation, the leadership had voted overwhelmingly to ask her to resign, and that she would have otherwise been expelled. Instead, she informed him that she would resign, shortly before the central executive committee (CEC) was due to meet on the matter. He also said that she had been instructed to substantiate the allegation readily.

The remaining MPs for Sengkang GRC did not resign to facilitate a by-election; each would represent a portion of the Compassvale division, which Raeesah had represented before her resignation. Faisal, as an incumbent MP for Aljunied GRC, was also made an advisor to the Sengkang MPs; Singh said that this addressed concerns on the lack of a minority MP for Sengkang GRC. (Note: Every team in a GRC is legally required to contain at least one minority (i.e. non-Chinese) candidate, either Malay or Indian/other (other being not Chinese, Malay or Indian). The mandatory minority category in a GRC is determined by the President. The number of GRCs requiring Malay candidates at a general election must be three-fifths of the total number of GRCs, or, if that is fractional, the next highest whole number.) The party said that, while it was not deterred by Raeesah's resignation from selecting "young and progressive candidates", it would review its candidate selection process and oversight of speeches.

== Aftermath ==
After investigations, the COP released its report on 10 February 2022. The report said that Singh, Faisal and Lim had guided Raeesah to maintain her false account and lied to the committee in the process, and recommended that Raeesah be fined $35,000: $25,000 for first making the allegation, and $10,000 for repeating it. It was also recommended that Singh and Faisal be further investigated by the Public Prosecutor, respectively for Singh's evidence before the committee and Faisal's refusal to answer relevant questions. The recommendations were accepted at a parliamentary debate on 15 February. On 29 April, the case was referred to the SPF to allow it to interview further related witnesses.

On 19 March 2024, the SPF and Attorney-General's Chambers announced that Faisal would not be charged for his refusal to answer questions asked by the COP. He was instead formally advised to understand the requirements of the Parliament (Privileges, Immunities and Powers) Act and to avoid violating it. On the same day, Singh was taken to court, where he pleaded not guilty to two counts of lying to the COP and claimed trial.

=== Trial of Pritam Singh ===
During the trial, the prosecution sought the maximum $7,000 that Singh could be fined for each count, portraying him as having intended to leave undisclosed the falsehood of Raeesah's allegation. According to the prosecution, the WP leadership did not take action on Raeesah's public statements until 3 October, but became "deeply involved" following 11 October, the day former party leader Low Thia Khiang was informed by Lim and Singh of Raeesah's false testimony.

Raeesah testified for the prosecution in the trial. In her testimony, she said that the disciplinary panel surprised her by focusing on her character and general conduct as an MP, and not on her lie, and that the WP leaders did not pay attention to what she said.

Former WP cadre Yudhishthra Nathan testified that, while visiting her on 3 October, Singh had told Raeesah, "I will not judge you". He also stated that he met Raeesah multiple times to finalise the statement announcing that she had lied in Parliament.

The defence instead argued for a maximum of $4,000 per count, with Singh's lawyer saying that the process started from Raeesah's false testimony. Lawyer Andre Jumabhoy portrayed her as a "habitual liar" during cross-examination.

On 17 February 2025, Singh was fined $7,000 per count for a total of $14,000; he indicated that he would appeal the decision. The judge accepted Raeesah's testimony and said that Singh had wilfully lied to the COP. Singh paid the fine after the High Court dismissed his appeal on 4 December. On 3 January 2026, the WP CEC ordered the establishment of an internal disciplinary panel on Singh's conviction for lying to Parliament. It was announced on 20 January that the panel comprised He Ting Ru and Jamus Lim, two of the incumbent MPs for Sengkang GRC, and Png Eng Huat, a former MP for Hougang Single Member Constituency (SMC).

=== Removal of Singh as Leader of the Opposition ===
On 9 January 2026, Indranee filed a motion to declare Singh unsuitable as the Leader of the Opposition. The motion stated that his continuation would "undermine the standing of parliament and public confidence in the integrity of Singapore's political system" and that his conduct was "dishonourable and unbecoming of a Member of Parliament"; he disputed both statements during the debate and said that his "conscience [would] always be clear". On 14 January, all Nominated MPs (NMPs) and MPs for the governing People's Action Party voted in favour of the motion, and all WP MPs, other than absent non-constituency MP (NCMP) Eileen Chong, voted against it; as a result, Singh was removed the next day by Prime Minister Lawrence Wong, who invited the WP to nominate another of its elected MPs to the role. After deliberation, the WP rejected the offer to nominate a new Leader of the Opposition through its website on 21 January, saying that the leader of the largest opposition party in Parliament was themself the leader of the opposition. In response, the Prime Minister's Office announced on the same day that it had accepted the rejection and that the position would remain vacant until the party was "ready to nominate someone to take on the responsibility".

=== Subsequent events ===
On 30 April 2026, Singh was found to have contravened the Articles 20(1) and 30 of the WP constitution and issued a letter of reprimand. On 28 June, the party held a special cadre meeting, at which several cadres and the CEC conducted a secret ballot. Four-fifths of the cadres, including Singh's predecessor Low Thia Khiang, voted to retain him as leader; there were no challengers for the leadership.

During a parliamentary session on 7 July, Indranee announced that Lim and Faisal would not be subject to further action, as the case was initiated during the first session of the previous parliamentary term and ended on the first session of the succeeding term. Singh's appeal in February 2025 was lodged during the second session of the same term; by the time the appeal was dismissed in December of the same year, the previous Parliament had already been dissolved. Under section 22 of the Parliament (Privileges, Immunity and Powers) Act 1962, Parliament may only punish offences committed in the previous session, or the last session of the previous term; as the case began during the first session of the previous term, Lim and Faisal were no longer eligible to be punished by Parliament. On 13 August, Singh, a non-practising lawyer, was disbarred by the Court of Three Judges and ordered to pay $5,808 in costs and disbursements to the Law Society of Singapore.
