= Court of Three Judges =

Branch of the Singaporean Supreme Court

The Court of Three Judges is a court of the Supreme Court of Singapore that adjudicates on professional misconduct of Singapore-qualified lawyers and doctors.

== Statutory framework ==
The Legal Profession Act 1966 and Medical Registration Act 1997 outlines that in the case where a disciplinary tribunal is convened by either the Law Society of Singapore or Singapore Medical Council, an application may thereafter be made for a hearing by three Supreme Court judges on liability for misconduct.

=== Legal misconduct ===
Any individual may refer a complaint about the conduct of a lawyer to the Council of the Law Society of Singapore, who may then convene an inquiry panel with members appointed by the Chief Justice. The inquiry panel investigates and reports on the complaint for the council. Upon considering the report, the council may decline further action, impose penalties, or apply for a disciplinary tribunal to be appointed. If a disciplinary tribunal is convened, it hears and investigates the matter and decides whether disciplinary action is warranted. The tribunal may impose a fine or decline further action, but if it determines that disciplinary action is necessary, the Law Society must apply to the Supreme Court for the matter to be heard by the Court of Three Judges. Unlike the disciplinary tribunal, which may only impose fines, the Court of Three Judges may disbar or suspend a lawyer and fine them up to $100,000.

== Notable cases ==
Recent high-profile decisions of the Court have included the acquittal of MP Christopher de Souza, the fine imposed on Lee Kuan Yew's daughter and niece Kwa Kim Li for her handling of Lee's will, and the suspension of human rights lawyer M Ravi for comments made about the Singapore judiciary.

Historical cases have included the suspensions of David Marshall, Francis Seow,, J. B. Jeyaretnam (later being reversed by the Privy Council), Charles Yeo, and more recently, Pritam Singh over a perjury conviction relating to the resignation of Raeesah Khan.

== See also ==
- Lawyers in Singapore
