= Jamus Lim =

Singaporean politician

The Honourable Jamus Lim
- 林志蔚
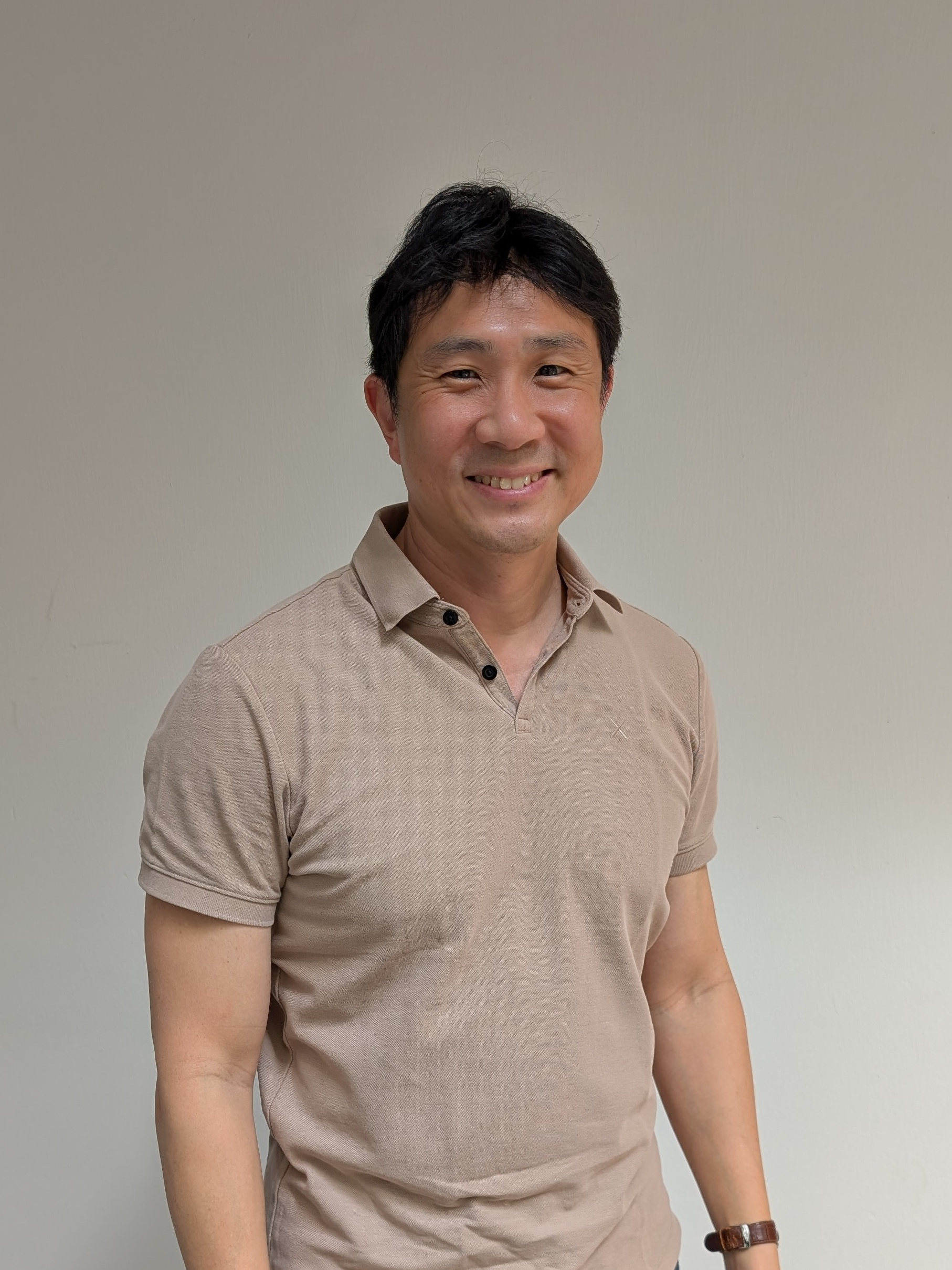
- Lim in 2025

Member of the Singapore Parliament for Sengkang GRC
- Incumbent
- Assumed office 10 July 2020
- Preceded by: Constituency established
- Majority: 2020: 4,898 (4.24%); 2025: 14,942 (12.64%)

Head of Policy Research Team of the Workers' Party
- Incumbent
- Assumed office 7 July 2026
- Preceded by: Gerald Giam

Personal details
- Born: Jamus Jerome Lim Chee Wui; 20 January 1976 (age 50) Singapore
- Party: Workers' Party
- Spouse: Eneida Patricia Alcalde
- Children: 1
- Education: University of Southern Queensland (BBus); London School of Economics (MS); Harvard University (ALM); University of California, Santa Cruz (MA, PhD)
- Occupation: Politician; economist; associate professor
- Website: Personal website

Jamus Jerome Lim Chee Wui (Note: Chinese: 林志蔚; Pe̍h-ōe-jī: Lîm Chì-ùi; pinyin: Lín Zhìweì) (born 20 January 1976) is a Singaporean politician, economist and associate professor. A member of the Workers' Party (WP), Lim has been the Member of Parliament (MP) for the Anchorvale division of Sengkang Group Representation Constituency (GRC) since 2020.

== Early life and career ==
Lim attended Catholic High School, Raffles Institution and Raffles Junior College as part of his early education in Singapore. He was a service medic in the Singapore Armed Forces (SAF) during his National Service (NS).

Lim graduated from the University of Southern Queensland in 1998 with a Bachelor of Business degree in economics. He then obtained a Master of Science degree in economics from the London School of Economics in 2000, and went on to the University of California, Santa Cruz, where he graduated in 2006 with a Master of Arts degree in politics and a PhD in international economics. In 2018, Lim graduated from Harvard Extension School with a Master of Liberal Arts degree in history.

Lim started his career at JP Morgan, before working at the World Bank for seven years, from 2007 to 2014, serving in its Development Prospects Group and specialising in long-term macroeconomic projections. He was an economist at the Institute for Southeast Asian Studies and the Abu Dhabi Investment Authority. In 2018, he joined the Singapore-based independent investment management firm Thirdrock. Lim is an associate professor of economics at ESSEC Business School in Singapore. On 23 July 2020, Lim was elected to the council of the Economic Society of Singapore (ESS).

== Political career ==
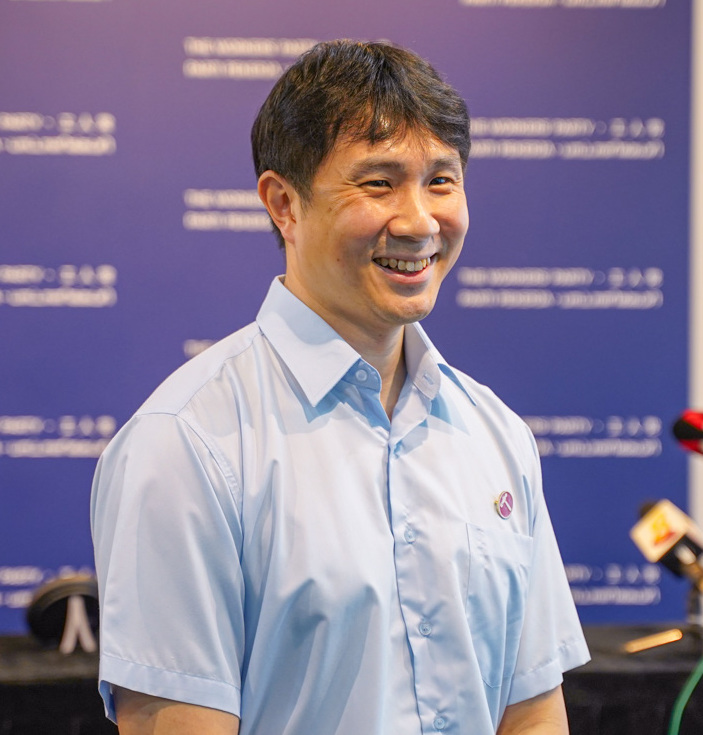
Lim at a press conference in 2020.

Lim became a member of the WP in September 2019, having previously volunteered in the party's grassroots activities.

On 30 June 2020, he was announced as part of a four-member WP team contesting in the newly-formed Sengkang GRC with team members, He Ting Ru, Louis Chua and Raeesah Khan in the 2020 general election.

On 1 July 2020, Lim engaged in a televised political debate with Francis Yuen from the Progress Singapore Party (PSP), Chee Soon Juan from the Singapore Democratic Party (SDP) and Minister Vivian Balakrishnan from the governing People's Action Party (PAP). His performance at the debate was well-received, with PN Balji of The New Paper writing that he was "smelling of roses" and Toh Wen Li of The Straits Times describing Lim as the "star candidate" of the party.

On 10 July 2020, following the results of the 2020 general election, Lim and his team were elected into Parliament after securing 52.12% of the vote, defeating Ng Chee Meng and his PAP team in an upset; the first time an opposition party claimed a newly-created constituency on its first attempt and the first opposition party to claim multiple GRCs.

On 11 July 2023, Speaker of Parliament Tan Chuan-Jin made a public apology to Lim after a clip of him using unparliamentary language during a 17 April parliamentary sitting was shared on Reddit; Tan had muttered "fucking populist" shortly after a 20-minute speech by Lim on the establishment of an official poverty line. Lim accepted Tan's apology.

During the 2025 general election, Lim with team members, He Ting Ru, Louis Chua and Abdul Muhaimin was re-elected in the 15th Parliament with an increased 56.32% vote share.

=== Party positions ===
On 27 December 2020, Lim was elected as Deputy Head of the Policy Research Team of the WP's Central Executive Committee (CEC). In June 2024, Lim was elected as WP's Youth Wing President replacing Nicole Seah who resigned over a extramarital affair with fellow MP Leon Perera. He served as youth wing president until June 2025 when he was replaced by non-constituency MP (NCMP) Eileen Chong. Lim subsequently became the Deputy Head of Policy Research.

On 8 July 2026, Lim was elected into the Central Executive Council (CEC) of the WP as Head of Policy Research.

=== Political positions ===
On 3 September 2020, Lim gave his maiden speech in Parliament. He asserted that there was "insufficient compassion in our policymaking process" and proposed that Singapore could implement a "simple, across-the-board minimum wage".

== Personal life ==
When young, Lim was a rugby player, drummer, and self-declared "Solitaire junkie". He is married to writer Eneida Patricia Alcalde, an American of Chilean–Puerto Rican descent; they have a daughter born in 2019.

On 12 October 2026, Lim was hospitalized after he was down with pneumonia following an Influenza A infection, and his blood oxygen levels fell below the healthy level range. Lim told that his volunteers in his Anchorvale division would took over his Meet-the-People Sessions at interim basis during his hospitalization. Six days prior to the hospitalization, during a Parliament sitting, Marine Parade-Braddell Heights GRC MP Diana Pang offered Lim a tissue after he was sneezing, and honestly admit to parliament that the haze had got him. Former Jurong GRC MP Tan Wu Meng gave wishes to Lim.

== Selected works and publications ==
- Yang, Tracy; Lim, Jamus Jerome (2004). "Crisis, contagion, and East Asian stock markets". Review of Pacific Basin Financial Markets and Policies. 7 (1): 119–151. doi:10.1142/S0219091504000068.
- Beardsley, Kyle; Lim, Jamus Jerome (2009). "Atoms for Peace, Redux: Energy Codependency for Sustained Cooperation on the Korean Peninsula". Peace Economics, Peace Science and Public Policy. 15 (1): 4. doi:10.2202/1554-8597.1129. S2CID 154607533.
- Lim, Jamus Jerome (2009). "Reinstating the Rational Voter". Economists' Voice. 6 (3): 1–2. doi:10.2202/1553-3832.1476. S2CID 153486971.
- Lim, Jamus Jerome; Janus, Thorsten (2009). "Sticks and Carrots: Two Incentive Mechanisms Supporting Intra-Group Cooperation". Economics Letters. 102 (3): 177–180. doi:10.1016/j.econlet.2008.12.012. hdl:10986/5880.
- Decker, Jessica Henson; Lim, Jamus Jerome (2009). "Democracy and trade: an empirical study". Economics of Governance. 10 (2): 165–186. doi:10.1007/s10101-008-0053-8. hdl:10986/5606. S2CID 44013869.
- Collins, Anne D.; Lim, Jamus Jerome (2010). "Recognition, Redistribution, and Liberty". Journal of Economic Behavior and Organization. 74 (3): 240–252. doi:10.1016/j.jebo.2010.03.005. hdl:10986/5541.
- Lim, Jamus Jerome; Saborowski, Christian (2012). "Export diversification in a transitioning economy". Economics of Transition. 20 (2): 339–367. doi:10.1111/j.1468-0351.2011.00430.x. S2CID 153512596.
- Haddad, Mona; Lim, Jamus Jerome; Pancaro, Cosimo; Saborowski, Christian (2013). "Trade openness reduces growth volatility when countries are well diversified". Journal of Monetary Economics. 46 (2): 765–790. doi:10.1111/caje.12031. hdl:10419/153924. S2CID 78052.
- Adams-Kane, Jonathon; Lim, Jamus Jerome (2016). "Institutional Quality Mediates the Effect of Human Capital on Economic Performance" (PDF). Review of Development Economics. 20 (2): 426–442. doi:10.1111/rode.12236. hdl:10986/18361. S2CID 54616164.
- Mohapatra, S; Lim, Jamus Jerome (2016). "The Effect of Quantitative Easing on Financial Flows to Developing Countries". Journal of International Money and Finance. 68 (1): 331–357. doi:10.1016/j.jimonfin.2016.02.009.
- Adams‐Kane, Jonathon; Caballero, Julian A; Lim, Jamus Jerome (2017). "Foreign bank behavior during financial crises" (PDF). Journal of Money, Credit and Banking. 49 (2–3): 351–392. doi:10.1111/jmcb.12382. hdl:10419/115470.
- Huidrom, Raju; Kose, Ayhan; Lim, Jamus Jerome; Ohnsorge, Franziska Lieselotte (2019). "Why do fiscal multipliers depend on fiscal positions?" (PDF). Canadian Journal of Economics. 114: 109–125. doi:10.1016/j.jmoneco.2019.03.004. S2CID 197770956.
- Lim, Jamus Jerome (2019). "Growth in the Shadow of Debt". Journal of Banking and Finance. 103 (1): 98–112. doi:10.1016/j.jbankfin.2019.04.002.
- Huidrom, Raju; Kose, M Ayhan; Lim, Jamus Jerome; Ohnsorge, Franziska L (2020). "Why do fiscal multipliers depend on fiscal positions?". Journal of Monetary Economics. 114: 109–125. doi:10.2139/ssrn.3360720. hdl:10986/31432.

== Notes ==
Parliament of Singapore
New constituency	Member of Parliament for Sengkang GRC; 2020–present Served alongside: (2020–2025): He Ting Ru, Raeesah Khan, Louis Chua (2025–present): He Ting Ru, Abdul Muhaimin, Louis Chua	Incumbent
