= Abdul Muhaimin =

Singaporean politician

The Honourable Abdul Muhaimin
- عبدال موهايمين
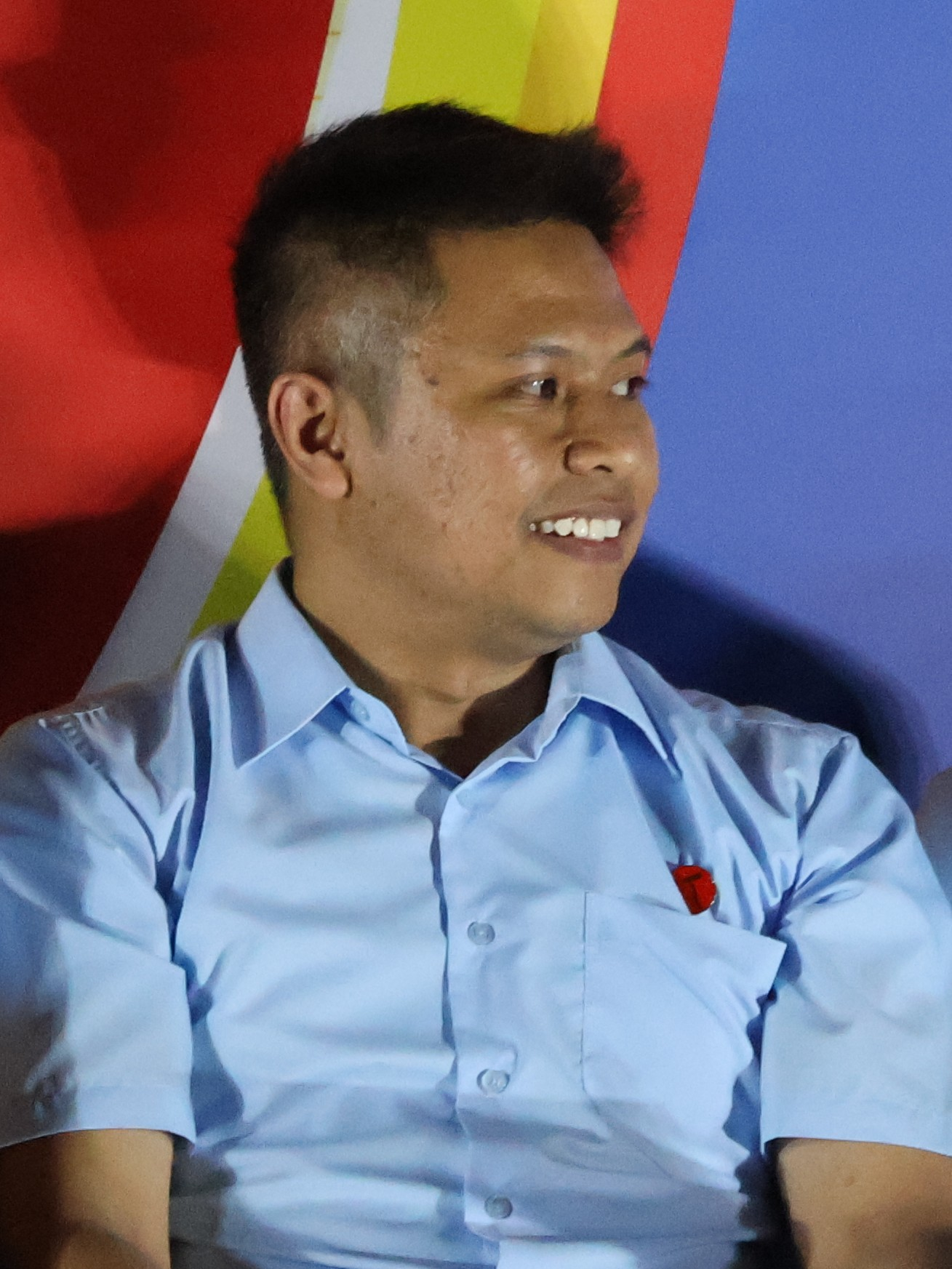
- Abdul Muhaimin in 2025

Member of the Singapore Parliament for Sengkang GRC
- Incumbent
- Assumed office 3 May 2025
- Preceded by: WP held
- Majority: 14,942 (12.64%)

Deputy Treasurer of the Workers' Party
- Incumbent
- Assumed office 7 July 2026
- Preceded by: Kenneth Tiong; Nathaniel Koh

Personal details
- Born: Abdul Muhaimin bin Abdul Malik; 5 April 1989 (age 37) Singapore
- Party: Workers' Party
- Education: Nanyang Technological University
- Occupation: Politician; engineer; property manager

Abdul Muhaimin bin Abdul Malik (Note: Jawi: عبدال موهايمين بن عبدال مَالِك) (born 5 April 1989) is a Singaporean politician and engineer. A member of the Workers' Party (WP), he has been the Member of Parliament (MP) for the Compassvale division of Sengkang Group Representation Constituency (GRC) since 2025.

== Early life ==
The eldest of four children, Abdul Muhaimin was educated at Tanjong Katong Secondary School and Tampines Junior College. He graduated from the Nanyang Technological University in 2016, with a degree in mechanical engineering.

== Career ==
Abdul Muhaimin began his career at Aljunied–Hougang Town Council (AHTC) as an assistant lift manager where he was in charge of multiple projects. Prior to the 2025 general election, he was a senior property manager with AHTC.

=== Political career ===
During the 2025 general election, Abdul Muhaimin was in a four-member WP team and contested in Sengkang GRC with He Ting Ru, Louis Chua, and Jamus Lim and won the GRC with 56.32% of the votes. Muhaimin was elected as Member of Parliament representing Sengkang GRC in the 15th Parliament.

==== Central Executive Council ====
On 18 June 2025, Abdul Muhaimin was elected into the Central Executive Council (CEC) of the WP as a deputy organising secretary. On 8 July 2026, Abdul Muhaimin was elected into the Central Executive Council (CEC) of the WP as a deputy treasurer.

==== Sengkang Town Council ====
Muhaimin has served as the Vice-Chairman of the Sengkang Town Council (SKTC) since 2025.

== Personal life ==
Abdul Muhaimin was named as an inspirational patient by SingHealth in 2011. On 6 April 2010, at age 21, Abdul Muhaimin had met with a serious accident where he was run over by a lorry. Admitted to the Changi General Hospital, he was bedridden for two months and had undergone more than seven months of treatment, surgeries and physiotherapy.

Abdul Muhaimin plays video games as a hobby. He also enjoys playing football and badminton for leisure.

Abdul Muhaimin is married with a daughter.

== Notes ==
Parliament of Singapore
| Preceded by He Ting Ru; Jamus Lim; Raeesah Khan; Louis Chua | Member of Parliament for Sengkang GRC; 2025–present Served alongside: He Ting Ru, Jamus Lim, Louis Chua | Incumbent |
