= Workers' Party (Singapore) =

Singaporean political party

Workers' Party: Parti Pekerja (Malay); 工人党 (Chinese); Gōngrén Dǎng; பாட்டாளிக் கட்சி (Tamil); Pāṭṭāḷik Kaṭci
- Abbreviation: WP
- Chairperson: Sylvia Lim
- Secretary-General: Pritam Singh
- Vice-Chairman: Faisal Manap
- Founder: David Marshall
- Founded: 3 November 1957; 69 years ago
- Preceded by: Labour Front
- Headquarters: 701 Geylang Road #04-02; Teambuild Centre; Singapore 389687
- Youth wing: Workers' Party Youth Wing
- Ideology: Social democracy
- Political position: Centre-left
- Colours: Red
- Slogan: Working for Singapore
- Parliament: 12 / 99 (12%)
- Town Councils: 2 / 19 (11%)

Website
- wp.sg

The Workers' Party (WP) is a major social democratic political party in Singapore and one of the two contemporary political parties represented in Parliament, alongside the governing People's Action Party (PAP). The WP sits on the centre-left of the political spectrum and is currently the largest and oldest opposition party in Parliament, having contested every parliamentary election since 1959 against the dominant PAP. Since the 2011 general election, the WP has been the only political party, other than the PAP, with elected Members of Parliament (MPs). (Note: The Singapore People's Party had a Non-constituency Member of Parliament (NCMP) appointed (not elected) in the 2011 general election, and the Progress Singapore Party had two NCMPs appointed in the 2020 general election.)

The Workers' Party was founded in 1957 by David Marshall, having previously led the more left-wing Labour Front (LF) to victory in 1955, forming a minority government and becoming the first Chief Minister of Singapore. After the British initially rejected his proposal for home rule, he resigned as leader of the LF and from his seat in 1957. After creating the WP, Marshall returned as its first representative in the Legislative Assembly as a Member for Anson in 1961, before resigning in 1963 after disagreements with some members of the party. The party would thereafter decline in prominence during the 1960s and 1970s before its re-emergence in 1981, when party leader Joshua Benjamin Jeyaretnam became the first opposition MP to be elected since Singapore's independence, having defeated the PAP's candidate at a by-election in Anson. Jeyaretnam was re-elected in 1984 with increased votes but subsequently lost his seat in 1986 following a conviction, which he claimed was politically motivated, for falsely accounting the party's funds. Other former members of the WP include former Law Society President Francis Seow and socialist activist Lee Siew Choh.

Since 1991, the party's safe seat and stronghold has been Hougang SMC, which was represented by Low Thia Khiang for two decades. The popularity of the party in Hougang has been attributed to the area's Teochew heritage and Low's personal affability. Low moved to Aljunied GRC in 2011, where he led the first team from an opposition party to win a GRC. In 2020, the WP became the first opposition party to win multiple GRCs in a single general election after defeating the PAP in the newly created Sengkang GRC while retaining Aljunied GRC and Hougang SMC. Positioning itself as a "check-and-balance" in Parliament, it supports a progressive approach to civic nationalism, reducing the voting age from 21 to 18, establishing a universal minimum wage, and providing more flexibility in regard to the Central Provident Fund. In recent years, members of the WP have worn light blue uniforms during political campaigns to represent the party's support for blue-collar workers.

== History ==
=== 1956–1965: Pre-independence and beginnings ===
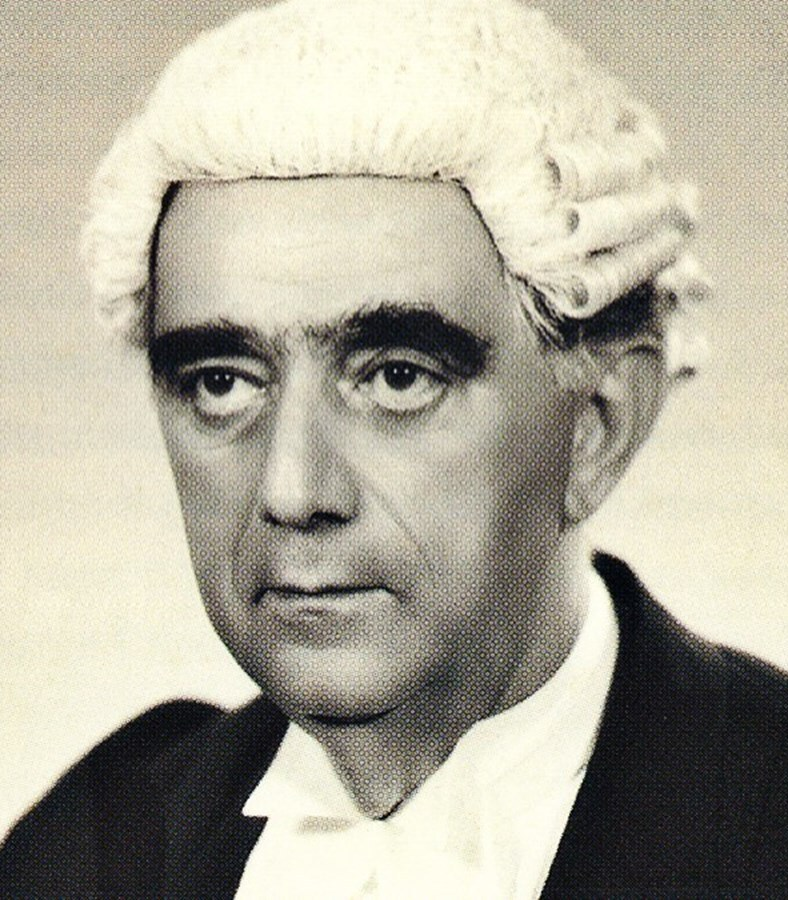
David Marshall, the first Chief Minister of Singapore and founder of the Workers' Party

In 1956, Singapore's first Chief Minister, David Saul Marshall, resigned from the leadership of the Labour Front (the largest party in the assembly at the time) following the failure of the Merdeka Talks that had sought self-governance for Singapore. He remained as the party's backbencher in the Legislative Assembly until his resignation in 1957. On 3 November that year, Marshall went on to found the Workers' Party (WP).

The WP made their political debut at the 1957 City Council election in December, where they fielded five candidates and saw success with four of them elected. Many were surprised at the outcome, as the WP was fairly new and Marshall himself had not stood for election; it was later revealed that the communists had agreed to support the WP. In March 1958, People's Action Party (PAP) assemblyman Lee Kuan Yew met with the Malayan Communist Party's (MCP) Fang Chuang Pi and asked him to prove his affiliation with the MCP by getting WP city councillor and vice president Chang Yuen Tong to resign. Fang promised to do so and, by May, Chang had resigned from the City Council and left-wing support for the WP disappeared soon thereafter, as their candidate in the subsequent by-election performed poorly against the PAP's candidate.

Marshall struggled to maintain the WP as five of its executive committee members left, along with WP members being seen canvassing for the PAP. Upon the creation of the Singapore People's Alliance (SPA) by chief minister Lim Yew Hock in November 1958, more members defected to join them, including three city councillors and one executive committee member. He responded by calling for the resignation of the city councillors and paying the S$50,000 required of them for breaking the party's terms. At the 1959 general election, the WP fielded three candidates, including Marshall, where he stood for Cairnhill against Lim. In the results, they failed to capture any seats, with Marshall's loss to Lim being the most unexpected, as the SPA had just been involved in the damaging Chew Swee Kee scandal.

Following the death in office of the PAP's Baharuddin Mohammed Ariff in 1961, a by-election was held in Anson, which Marshall decided to contest in. Unbeknownst to him, the communists decided to support Marshall in order to show their control over the voters to the PAP and, in the results, Marshall ended up narrowly winning over the PAP's Mahmud bin Awang. In the Legislative Assembly, like the rest of the opposition, Marshall opposed the government's terms for merger with Malaysia and was a member of the Council of Joint Action, which planned to halt the 1962 referendum. He ultimately later supported merger after a decision of common citizenship within Malaysia was settled.

However, WP vice president Sum Chong Heng and secretary-general Chua Chin Kiat disagreed with Marshall's support for merger, and they decided to secretly misrepresent Marshall's and the WP's views in the Chinese-language press. When the issue came to Marshall's attention, he called for their expulsion and they later resigned from the WP. But at the WP's 1963 annual election to decide its leadership, Chua was reelected as secretary-general, prompting Marshall to resign from the party entirely on 20 January.

=== 1965–1986: Post-independence, debut of J. B. Jeyaretnam ===
On 9 August 1965, Singapore was declared independent, and the Legislative Assembly was reformed as the Parliament of Singapore. 1968 was the first post-independence election, which saw PAP winning every one of 58 contested seats (51 by a walkover, and the other seven on polling day), due to the election boycotting of the main opposition party at the time, the Barisan Sosialis, leading to the mass arrests of most of its leadership since 1963.

Having become a small and fairly insignificant party by the late-1960s, the party saw a rejuvenation upon the recruitment of a group of lawyers, including J. B. Jeyaretnam, who became the party's secretary-general. Despite fielding a large slate of candidates in succeeding elections, the ruling PAP still managed to retain its monopoly by winning every contested seat for the next three general elections (including by-elections).

On 13 October 1981, Devan Nair vacated his Anson seat to assume his role as the nation's third President, precipitating the by-election; on 31 October, the party's candidate Jeyaretnam secured a historic victory as he became the first opposition MP-elect to be elected in Parliament with 51.9% (7,012) of the valid votes cast, beating PAP's Pang Kim Hin's 47.1% (6,359) and UPF's Harbans Singh's 1.0% (131). This also marked the first time since 1961 that the Anson electorate voted the WP into the assembly. Jeyaretnam then went on to hold the constituency in the 1984 elections with an increased margin of 56.8%.

However, two months later, Jeyaretnam was charged with falsely accounting the party's funds. In October 1986, Senior District Judge Michael Khoo found Jeyaretnam innocent of all charges but one. The prosecution later appealed for a retrial to be held in a different district court; Jeyaretnam was found guilty for all the charges, which resulted in him losing his seat and was issued a five-year election ban, though he subsequently remained as the party's secretary-general. (Note: At the time of the ban, Jeyaretnam had exceeded the fine quantum of at least S$2,000 (or alternatively, at least 12 months of jail term) in one of the charges for the disqualification to take effect per the Constitution; the fine quantum has since raised to S$10,000 in May 2022. In Singh's case in 2025, he was retained of his eligibility for elections as his two fines (of S$7,000 each) could not be combined to meet the criteria for disqualification from elections.)

=== 1987–1997: Barisan Sosialis merger, debut of Low Thia Khiang ===
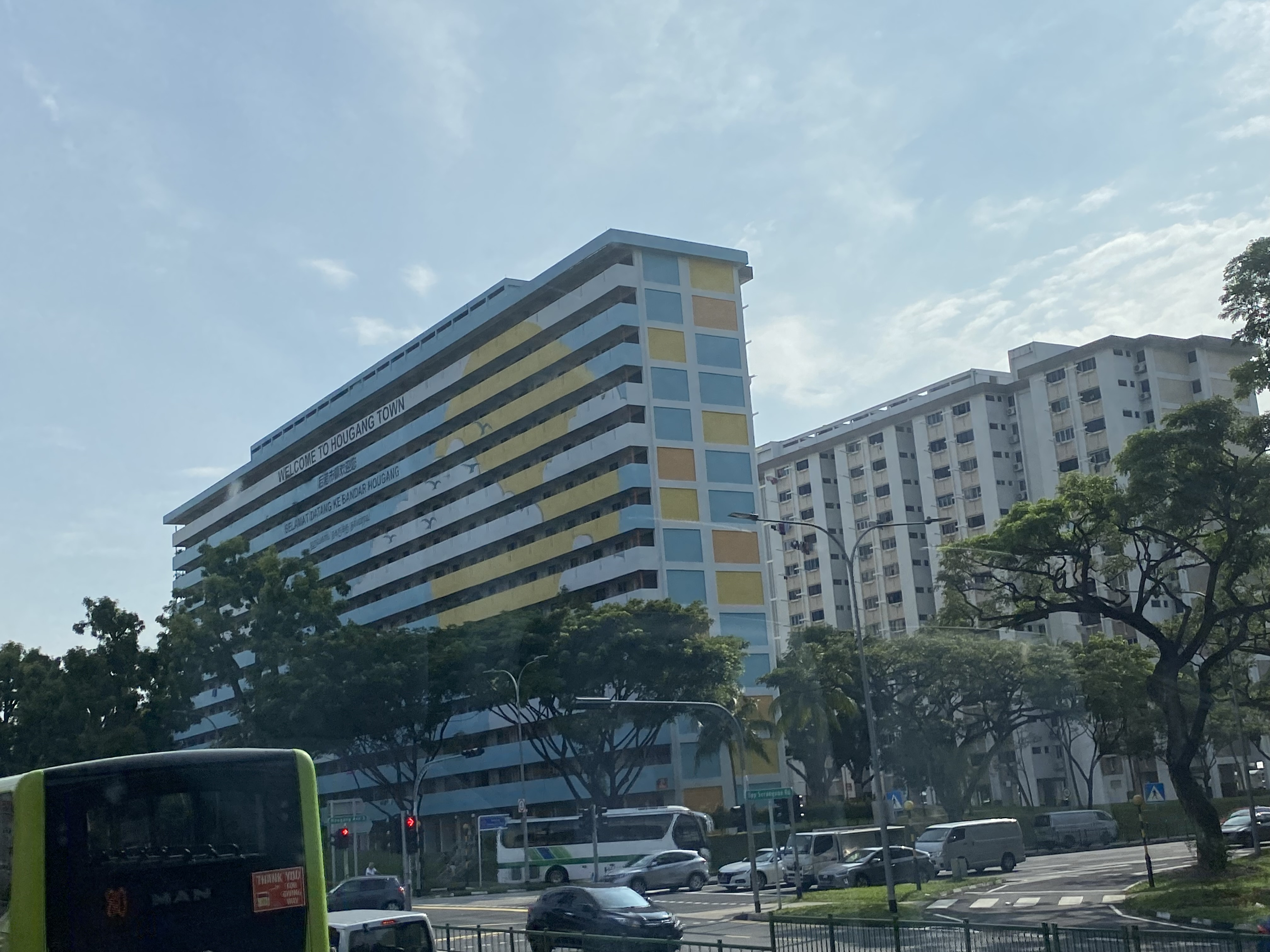
A residential block (pictured in 2023) in Hougang SMC, a safe seat for the WP. The party, fielding Low Thia Khiang, first won the constituency in 1991.

In 1987, some Workers' Party members were among a group of 22 people arrested by Singapore's Internal Security Department as part of Operation Spectrum, accused of being Marxists. They were released on condition that they kept out of politics.

Prior to the 1988 general elections, Barisan Sosialis and the Singapore United Front merged with the party to gather the opposition parties together to challenge the PAP and also the need to form teams of candidates to contest in the new Group Representation Constituency (GRC) system for the upcoming election. WP did not win any constituency but came very close to winning the Eunos GRC, in which the party's team, consisting of Francis Seow (a former head of the Bar Society who had briefly been detained under the Internal Security Act prior to the general election), Lee Siew Choh (a former chairman of the Barisan Sosialis and former PAP Assemblyman from 1959 to 1961) and Mohd Khalit bin Mohd Baboo, scored 49.1%; only one opposition MP was returned to Parliament (Chiam See Tong of the Singapore Democratic Party). However, since the team garnered the highest percentage of the vote secured by losing opposition candidates during the election, the party was eligible to nominate two members of its team to become Non-constituency MPs (NCMPs). The party had refused to nominate NCMPs in the past, but this time they nominated Lee and Seow to do so. While Lee accepted the offer, Seow however declined to do so and instead fled the United States following accusations of espionage. The election also marked the political debut of then-organising secretary Low Thia Khiang, who contested the three-seat Tiong Bahru GRC, and would capture its eventual safe seat of Hougang SMC in the 1991 general election.

Jeyaretnam was sued for slander by then Prime Minister Lee Kuan Yew for comments he made at an election rally in 1988; Jeyaretnam was ordered to pay Lee damages of S$260,000 including costs following an unsuccessful lawsuit. Jeyaretnam was again sued and paid damages of S$465,000 and S$250,000 in court costs for an article he wrote in an issue of the party's newspaper, The Hammer, where he called Indian PAP leaders stooges.

During the 1991 election campaign, one of the WP's candidates in Eunos GRC, Jufrie Mahmood, came under fire from the PAP and Prime Minister Goh Chok Tong as they accused him of being a Malay chauvinist, a claim which Jufrie strongly denied. As with the 1988 election, the WP lost to the PAP team while polling strongly in the GRC (47.6% to 52.4%). No NCMPs were offered as the opposition (including Low) elected now occupied a combined four seats in parliament. Following the election, Low became the Assistant Secretary-General.

A by-election in 1992 for Marine Parade GRC was expected to mark the return of Jeyaretnam to electoral politics after his Parliamentary ban had expired; however, the team ultimately did not participate due to one of its candidates turning up late on the nomination day. In 1993, Jeyaretnam and another candidate, Tan Soo Phuan (now a member of Democratic Progressive Party), attempted to seek candidacy in the first-ever presidential election; however, both candidates were not granted the Certificate of Eligibility, an item presidential candidates required to complete their nominations. In 1996, Lee Siew Choh resigned from the party, citing differences with Jeyaretnam.

=== 1997–2006: Renewal in the new millennium ===
In the 1997 elections, Low was re-elected as Hougang MP in the 1997 general election. Besides Low, only one other opposition MP was elected (Chiam See Tong, who left SDP to join the Singapore People's Party); one NCMP was to be nominated from the WP team for Cheng San GRC, as they had polled better than any other losing opposition candidates with 45.2% of the vote share; the party selected secretary-general (and candidate) Jeyaretnam as the NCMP, marking his return to Parliament after 11 years.

During the election campaign, another candidate who was part of the WP's team in Cheng San, lawyer Tang Liang Hong, drew particular attention from the PAP as they accused him of being an anti-Christian and anti-Muslim Chinese chauvinist. Tang, who insisted all he was trying to do was to "better represent the Chinese community and ask questions on their behalf", vigorously denied this charge and accused the PAP of trying to win votes by damaging his reputation and preventing people from voting him. Tang also attacked the PAP with regards to the Hotel Properties Ltd case (which started when the Stock Exchange of Singapore criticised Hotel Properties Ltd for its "tardiness" in disclosing details of sales of its condominium units to directors and their family members). (Note: Because Singapore's Senior Minister Lee Kuan Yew and his wife took discounts while purchasing an apartment in 1996, and younger brother Suan Yew was on the board of directors of the company, these claims raised suspicions of impropriety. Tang made these allegations in a Chinese magazine Yazhou Zhoukan, which later lost a libel suit filed by Lee Kuan Yew and was ordered to pay damages. Deputy Prime Ministers Lee Hsien Loong and Tony Tan, along with former Cabinet Minister S. Dhanabalan and Heng Chiang Meng, President of the Real Estate Developer's Association of Singapore (REDAS), told the House that it was normal practice for developers to cite high list prices and offer customers varying discounts. Warren Fernandez, "Full details of condo deals revealed", The Straits Times, 22 May 1996, p.1) Lee, who had purchased one of the units, claimed that Tang was trying to milk this issue for political capital; the PAP sued Tang for defamation and branding the PAP leadership as liars, for a total of S$13.6 million of damages. Tang fled to Australia shortly after the election, and never returned until his death in 2025.

Prior to the 2001 election, Jeyaretnam was discharged from his NCMP seat due to an undischarged bankruptcy (having failed to keep up with payments of S$120,000 worth of damages owed from a libel suit brought by Prime Minister Goh Chok Tong and other PAP leaders following comments he had made at an election rally in 1997, but since fulfilled and discharged from bankruptcy in May 2007); Jeyaretnam then relinquished his Secretary-General post to Low. The party became acrimonious as Jeyaretnam later accused Low of not doing enough to help him pay the damages from the libel suit. In response, Low claimed that he had always looked upon Jeyaretnam as an elder and had done everything possible to help him. Jeyaretnam left WP to form Reform Party in June 2008, before dying of heart failure three months later.

Many observers speculated that with Low at the helm, WP would campaign in a more centrist manner for the 2001 election. After assuming leadership, Low recruited a series of young members to the party, including James Gomez, Yaw Shin Leong and Sylvia Lim. In that election, WP only contested Hougang and Nee Soon East SMCs while plans to contest the GRCs of Ang Mo Kio, East Coast and Pasir Ris–Punggol were abandoned. WP also attempted their bid to contest Aljunied GRC, but were later disqualified. Low called the disqualification in Aljunied GRC an "oversight" and a belated April Fools' joke, saying that he took full responsibility for it. Low was re-elected as the MP of Hougang SMC albeit a drop of his vote share, winning the only seat for WP in the election.

=== 2006–2011: Major electoral breakthroughs, debut of Pritam Singh ===
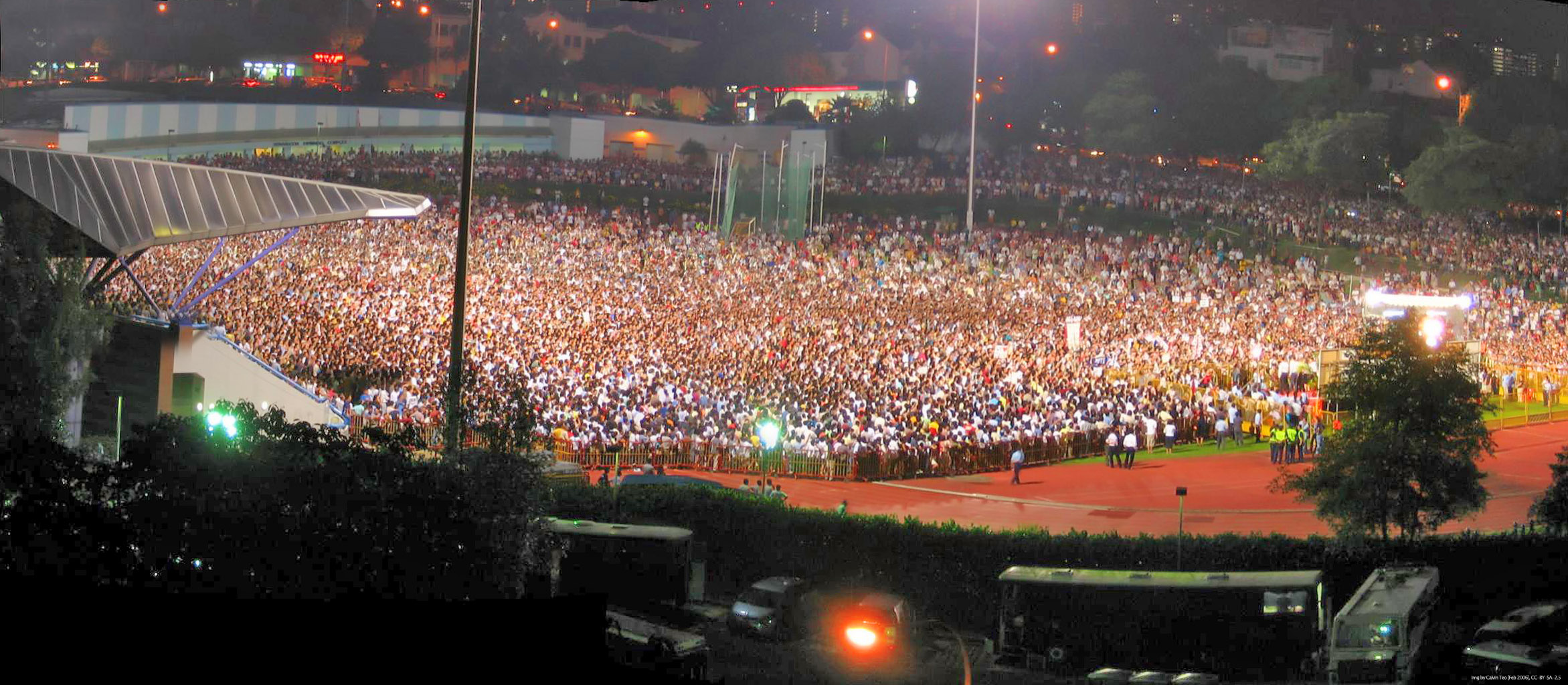
A Workers' Party election rally at the Serangoon Stadium.

At the 2006 general election, WP launched an updated manifesto in January 2006 entitled "You Have a Choice". The 52-page booklet outlined the party's stand on issues and policies, covering areas from economic and judicial policies to media and sports and recreation. The manifesto, which had last been updated in 1994, took one year to work on according to Low. PAP then panned the party's manifesto citing "time-bombs", quipping that it contained only threats to the PAP's power.

Both the WP and Chiam's Singapore Democratic Alliance (SDA) each fielded 20 candidates to contest in seven constituencies. In the ensuing election, Low was elected as Hougang MP for the fourth time by an increased margin of 62.7%. The party also polled strongly in Aljunied GRC, losing to the PAP's team with 43.91%-56.09% vote and allowing the party to elect an NCMP seat by virtue of being the best-performing opposition losers, which went to the chairwoman Sylvia Lim, who become its first female NCMP. Another team of young first-time candidates, led by Yaw Shin Leong in Ang Mo Kio GRC (helmed by then-Prime Minister Lee Hsien Loong), garnered 33.86% of the vote, 0.46% above the opposition's national average. After the election, Low succeeded Chiam as the new leader of the opposition, having outperformed their contested vote share of 38.43% versus SDA's 32.52%.

During the campaigning, Aljunied candidate James Gomez came under scrutiny after he falsely claimed that he had submitted his minority-race candidate's application form during a visit to the Elections Department alongside Lim on 24 April. ELD later found out that Gomez had slipped the form through his bag, which was captured by a closed-circuit television footage, which prompted the party to launch an investigation on Gomez. On 8 May, Gomez was detained in Changi Airport while he was about to leave Singapore; he was eventually released on 16 May with a warning from the police, citing inconsistencies and lack of criminal records.

The manifesto for the 2011 general election was titled "Towards a First World Parliament", which also became their campaign slogan. One key proposal was for more affordable public housing such that Housing Development Board (HDB) lessees should be able to pay off their mortgage loans within 20 years rather than 30. Prior to nomination day on 27 April, he announced that he would contest Aljunied GRC with Lim and three of his "A-List" candidates, which were Taiwanese-Singaporean corporate lawyer Chen Show Mao, freelance counsellor Faisal Manap, and law postgraduate and former SAF major Pritam Singh (who eventually later become Low's successor), leaving his seat of Hougang to Yaw. The party fielded a total of 23 candidates contesting in eight constituencies (behind National Solidarity Party's (NSP) 24, who also contested eight constituencies), their largest slate since 1988.

On 7 May, the WP team in Aljunied GRC achieved the first-ever GRC victory for any opposition party in history; their score of 54.71% unseated the PAP team, led by Foreign Minister George Yeo and Minister of the Prime Minister's Office Lim Hwee Hua. The Hougang ward was also retained by Yaw with its best performance for the party at 64.80% of the votes (second only to Chiam's 1991 score of 69.64%), resulting in six WP members being elected into Parliament. Their party's overall vote was its best performance at the time of the election, with 46.60% of the votes combined from the eight constituencies they contested. Additionally, Lim and Manap became the first female former NCMP and Malay opposition MP respectively to be elected into Parliament.

Due to an increase of minimum opposition seats from three to nine, the party was also offered two of the three NCMP seats. After selecting Gerald Giam and Yee Jenn Jong (who contested East Coast GRC and Joo Chiat SMC respectively), the party brought its total representation to eight seats. East Coast GRC candidate Eric Tan later resigned from WP, citing his disagreement with the NCMP appointment. A month later on 12 June, the party launched its grassroots arm for Aljunied GRC, called the Aljunied Constituency Committee. It also combined the Hougang and Aljunied town councils to form the Aljunied–Hougang Town Council (AHTC).

=== 2012–2013: Success in by-elections and start of AHTC lawsuit ===
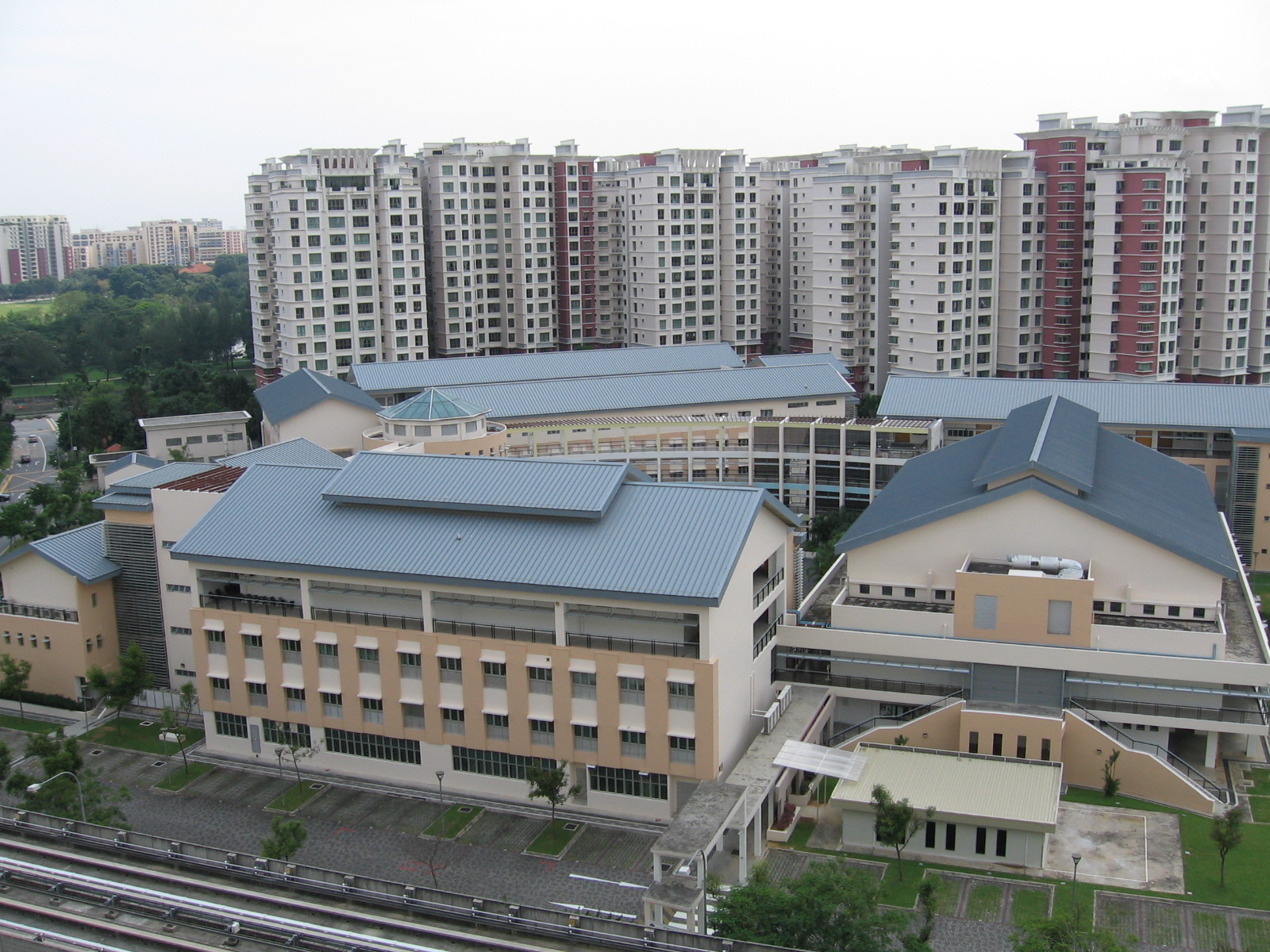
North Vista Secondary School, one of the counting centres for the Punggol East SMC (later as Sengkang GRC since 2020).

On 15 February 2012, the party expelled Hougang SMC MP Yaw Shin Leong, for failing to account for allegations made against him. Prior to his expulsion, Yaw was accused of having an extramarital affair, as well as party misconduct that had surfaced earlier that year; Yaw had up to 24 February to appeal against his expulsion, but declined, precipitating the by-election which was held on 26 May. The seat was retained by 2011 East Coast GRC candidate Png Eng Huat with a majority of 62.08%. Shortly after the elections, Poh Lee Guan was also expelled from the party after attempting to contest the by-election as a "backup candidate" without consulting the party's CEC, with the CEC condemning Poh's reason as unacceptable.

On 12 December, a by-election to be held the following year was called after PAP MP for Punggol East SMC and speaker Michael Palmer resigned for having an affair with a People's Association (PA) staff; the party announced their candidacy shortly after the announcement.

Prior to nomination day, the party announced plans to purchase its own premises as its current rented premises at Syed Alwi Road was too small for its operations. Sufficient funds were eventually raised and the new HQ was opened in 2017, coinciding with the party's 60th anniversary.

On 16 January 2013, the party fielded Lee Li Lian, a candidate who had previously contested the same ward in the 2011 election. On 26 January, Lee was elected with 54.52% of the votes (debuting PAP candidate Koh Poh Koon received 43.71%, and the remaining 1.77% went to two minor parties), marking the second by-election since 1981 in which the party had gained any parliamentary seats from the PAP.

Ahead of the two by-elections, WP called for a tender for managing agent services for their town council, with only FMSS submitting a bid. After the Punggol East by-election, Punggol East SMC was absorbed into AHTC, renaming the Town Council to Aljunied–Hougang–Punggol East Town Council (AHPETC) until 2015, when Lee was defeated for re-election (see below). In February 2015, the Auditor-General's Office (AGO) carried out an audit on AHPETC and found several lapses in governance and compliance, which became the subject of parliamentary debate.

=== 2015–2016: Leadership renewal and setbacks ===
Ahead of the 2015 elections, coinciding with the nation's golden jubilee, the party announced that it would contest 28 seats in ten constituencies, slightly under a third of the 89 parliamentary seats. They revealed their slogan for the election, "Empower Your Future". In August 2015, chairwoman Lim confirmed the first batch of candidates, with all seven elected MPs defending their respective constituencies; the list were finalized by the end of the month.

On 11 September, the team for Aljunied GRC and Png's Hougang SMC were re-elected for another term in Parliament, but by a reduced winning margin of 50.96% (Note: The results for Aljunied GRC were not revealed until 3.10 a.m. after the end of a vote recount requested by the PAP; under the first-past-the-post system, two of the five divisions in Aljunied GRC (Paya Lebar and Serangoon) voted in favour of PAP by about 200-300 votes, while the other divisions (Bedok Reservoir-Punggol, Eunos and Kaki Bukit) voted in favour of WP by about 500-1,000 votes. The WP team was elected after garnering 2,398 more votes in total than the PAP team.) and 57.69% respectively, while in Punggol East SMC, incumbent Lee was defeated to Deputy Speaker and PAP candidate Charles Chong with 48.24% of the vote. The party's overall popular vote in the ten constituencies it contested fell from 46.60% to 39.75%.

Consequently, the party became the only opposition party to be represented in Parliament for the first time since 1981–84, having received all three NCMP seats, totalling the minimum nine opposition members when added to the six seats of their two retained constituencies. Lee was the first of the three NCMPs; Dennis Tan, who had contested Fengshan SMC, was next in line, while the party's East Coast GRC team nominated Leon Perera for the third seat. Following Lee's decline of the offer, the party announced that they would nominate Daniel Goh from East Coast GRC as the third NCMP should Parliament allow another appointment. The PAP-controlled Parliament approved Goh's appointment on 29 January 2016, allowing him to be elected as an NCMP via an announcement from the Election Department on 4 February.

On 29 May 2016, leader Low successfully fended off an unprecedented challenge for his Secretary-General post by Chen for the first time in the party's history. Chen was re-appointed by Low to his previous position as Treasurer for another three months from 7 June 2016 until 9 September 2016, as he had already served two terms in the post. On 7 June, the party appointed Pritam Singh as Assistant Secretary-General.

=== 2016–2019: Continued AHTC lawsuits and handover to Pritam Singh ===
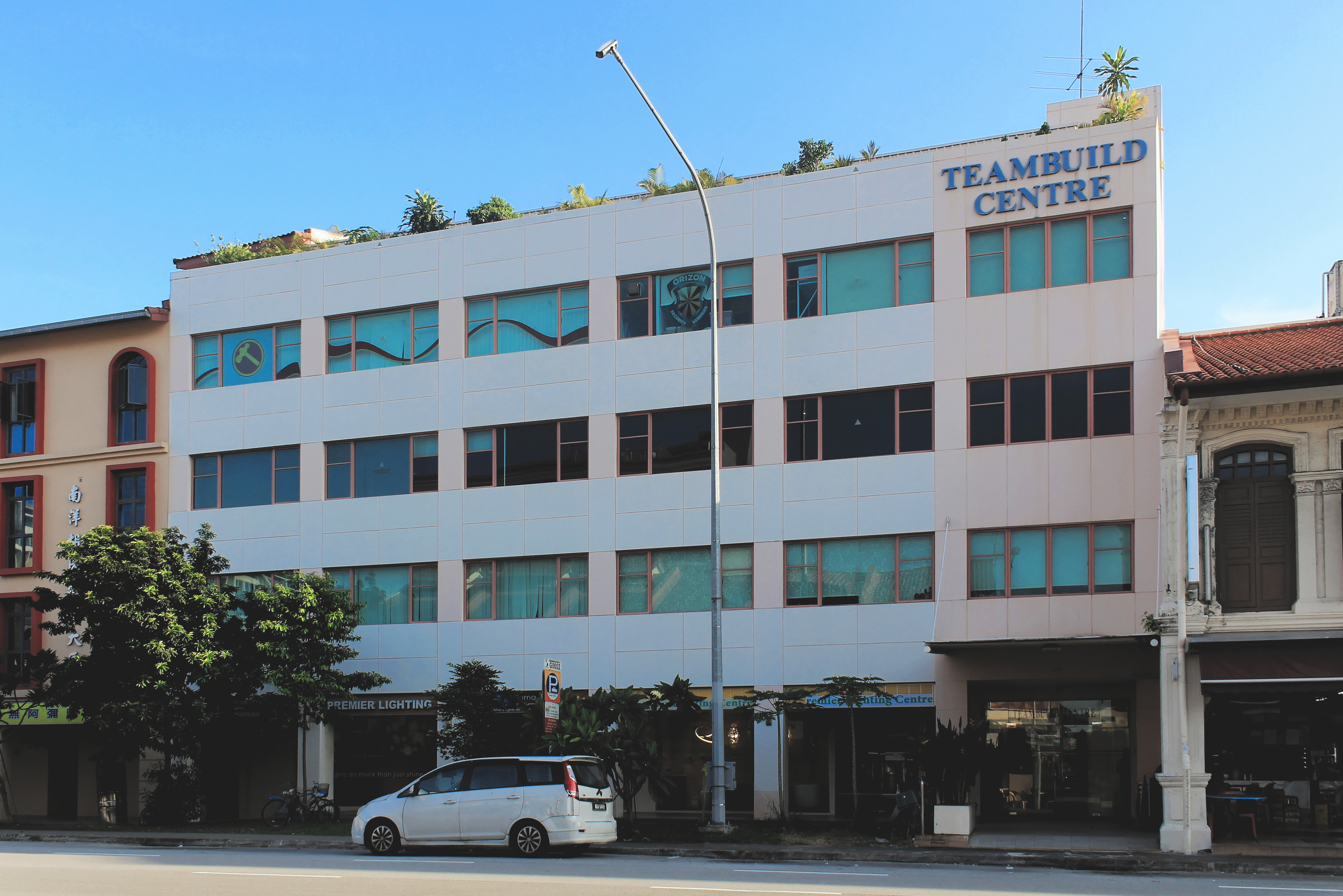
The Workers' Party headquarters has been located at the Teambuild Centre along Geylang Road since 2017

On 26 July 2017, AHTC, which had appointed an independent panel of three lawyers at the behest of MND and HDB, sued town council chairperson Singh, vice-chairperson Lim, party leader Low, and three others, including the town council's former managing agent, for improper payments made to the MA.

On 29 September, the party's headquarters were relocated from Syed Alwi Road to the Teambuild Centre, along Geylang Road.

On 3 November, an anniversary dinner was held on Harbourfront Centre, marking a milestone of 60 years since the party's foundation. On the same night, Low announced during his speech that he would step down from his role of Secretary-General and would not seek candidacy for the next CEC's election the following year. A commemorative biographical book for the party, Walking With Singapore, was launched at bookstores the following day. On 8 April 2018, Singh succeeded Low's position as the next Secretary-General unopposed.

On 26 July, the WP was among the nine opposition parties invited for a gathering led by former PAP member and presidential candidate Tan Cheng Bock, but did not attend. The party later announced that it was "going through a leadership transition" and "is focused on organisation building to better serve Singaporeans".

On 3 October, a $33.7 million trial was initiated between AHTC and the defendants of Low, Lim, Singh, and two other town councillors. The trial went on until 25 October, where the three politicians launched an appeal to fund their legal fees, having depleted their personal resources after paying their lawyers close to S$600,000 for work done before the trial. Three days later, they closed their fundraising appeal after raising more than S$1 million for legal fees, while thanking the public for their support.

=== 2020–2025: Further gains, Raeesah Khan's controversy and end of AHTC lawsuits ===
Ahead of the elections on 10 July 2020, the party introduced their slogan, "Make Your Vote Count" along with 12 new party members, which included former NSP candidate Nicole Seah. On Nomination Day, they fielded a total of 21 candidates to contest in six constituencies: Hougang SMC and the existing GRCs of Aljunied, East Coast, and Marine Parade, as well as the newly formed Punggol West SMC and Sengkang GRC. Low Thia Khiang, along with fellow incumbents Chen Show Mao and Png Eng Huat, did not contest the election, marking Low's retirement after a 32-year career. Low had earlier been hospitalised on 30 April due to a head injury he sustained and was on rehabilitation. They were replaced respectively by NCMPs Gerald Giam, Leon Perera and Dennis Tan to complete the team line-up. Former NCMP Daniel Goh and former Punggol East MP Lee Li Lian also did not stand for the election.

During campaigning, Sengkang GRC candidate Jamus Lim received critical acclaim during a live debate on 1 July for his debating skills and charisma. On 5 July, two separate police reports were lodged against Raeesah Khan, another Sengkang GRC candidate, both for alleged discriminatory comments regarding race and religion. She later told the media that she had intended to promote awareness about minority concerns, while also expressing remorse for having made said insensitive comments. The Singapore Police Force warned her on 17 September of the same year.

On 10 July, the WP became the best performing opposition party to date, with 10 elected seats and 50.49% of contested votes, surpassing the previous record of 48.56% held by SDP in 1991 and becoming the first opposition party to win the combined popular vote in contested seats. The party increased their margins in Aljunied GRC and Hougang SMC with 59.95% and 61.21% respectively, while also capturing the new Sengkang GRC (led by former Marine Parade GRC candidate He Ting Ru) with 52.12% of the vote, making it the second GRC to be captured by any opposition party. Following the election, Singh was appointed as the first official Leader of the Opposition by Prime Minister Lee Hsien Loong, the role having been unofficial in the past. On 27 December, five months after the elections, another CEC election was held at Clarke Quay, with Lim and Singh re-elected as chair and Secretary-General respectively. All four Sengkang GRC members, as well as Nicole Seah and Kenneth Foo were elected into the CEC, while former MPs Chen, Goh and Lee, as well as Firuz Khan, John Yam and Terence Tan, stepped down.

On 30 November 2021, Sengkang MP Raeesah Khan resigned from the WP and Parliament after being investigated for lying during parliamentary speeches on women's empowerment, which happened three months earlier. Two days later, the Central Executive Committee (CEC) claimed to have known about the lies the week after her speech, but allowed her to clarify herself after knowing her circumstances. Furthermore, it was claimed that the party leaders voted overwhelmingly to ask Khan to resign even before she did so, threatening to expel her otherwise. Instead, Khan informed Singh that she would resign, before the CEC met on the matter. The other three MPs for Sengkang GRC did not step down for a by-election, as the GRC was not empty; the responsibilities for Compassvale were instead divided among them. Then-party vice-chair and Aljunied GRC MP Faisal Manap also became an advisor for Compassvale until 2025. Former NCMP Daniel Goh publicly questioned Khan's resignation on Facebook in several posts and also asked the party leadership to take responsibility for "allowing the transgression to persist". He was subsequently expelled from the WP in 2023.

On 7 July 2023, the Supreme Court of Singapore found both Lim and Low, but not Singh, liable for control failures in regards to payment processes in both Aljunied-Hougang and Sengkang Town Councils, leading to a risk of overpayment. The court found them to have breached their fiduciary duties in 2019, but a subsequent appeal in 2022 revealed that its party councillors and the town employees did not owe fiduciary duties. On 22 August, the Ministry of National Development brought considerations for regulatory action pending clarification from AHTC, under witness of its three party leaders, as well as town councillors Chua Zhi Hon, Kenneth Foo, How Weng Fan and Danny Loh, to ensure the safekeeping of the money totalling S$33.7 million in improper payments. In a statement from the Court of Appeal on 29 November, both town councils were ordered to pay a combined total of about S$388,800 (S$176,241.11 and S$212,543.52 for AHTC and SKTC, respectively) to the town councillors as a result of the appeals, where the court determined that most issues in their appeals were not found from AHTC, and that liabilities of certain duties had since persisted. The three aforementioned MPs, however, had also been liable for negligence to SKTC for permitting control failures as well.

On 17 July 2023, a video of Aljunied MP Leon Perera and the party's youth wing president Nicole Seah behaving intimately in a restaurant surfaced online. Perera's former personal driver had also been involved in the alleged relationship according to a press interview. While he had approached the party leaders about this between 2020 and 2021, they deferred to the pair's denials. Seah and Perera resigned on 18 and 19 July respectively, acknowledging that the extramarital affair had happened but claiming that it "stopped sometime ago". Both members had earlier denied any accusations. The responsibilities of Perera were subsequently divided among the remaining MPs of Aljunied GRC. On 11 September, Perera revealed that his Facebook account had been hacked with posts made after 17 June 2021 deleted, and that he had since reported the hack to Meta. While Perera was later seen at multiple PSP events sometime in January 2025, he subsequently confirmed his residency in New York City to be an executive director at Yamada Consulting Group USA, implying that it was unlikely for him to contest in the election; PSP also confirmed that Perera was not one of their members.

On 19 March 2024, Singh was charged in court for two counts on falsely testifying to a parliamentary committee in relation to Raeesah Khan's mishandling of a case dating back to November 2021; he took a four-week adjournment to engage a lawyer prior to a pre-trial, which was held on April 17. He remained an MP while on trial. The other WP member involved, Faisal Manap, was not charged. On 17 February 2025, Singh was found guilty for these charges and given a $7,000 fine for both counts, though he had since lodged for an appeal. His appeal was dismissed on 4 December.

On 3 November 2022, a three-minute trailer on a documentary film titled Hougang was uploaded on their YouTube page to commemorate the 65th anniversary of the party's founding. A full video of the documentary was released exactly two years later in November 2024. The end of the film was dedicated to party pioneer Lim Ee Ping, who died of cancer on 29 May 2024 prior to the release.

=== 2025–present: WP after Low's retirement and end of Khan's saga ===
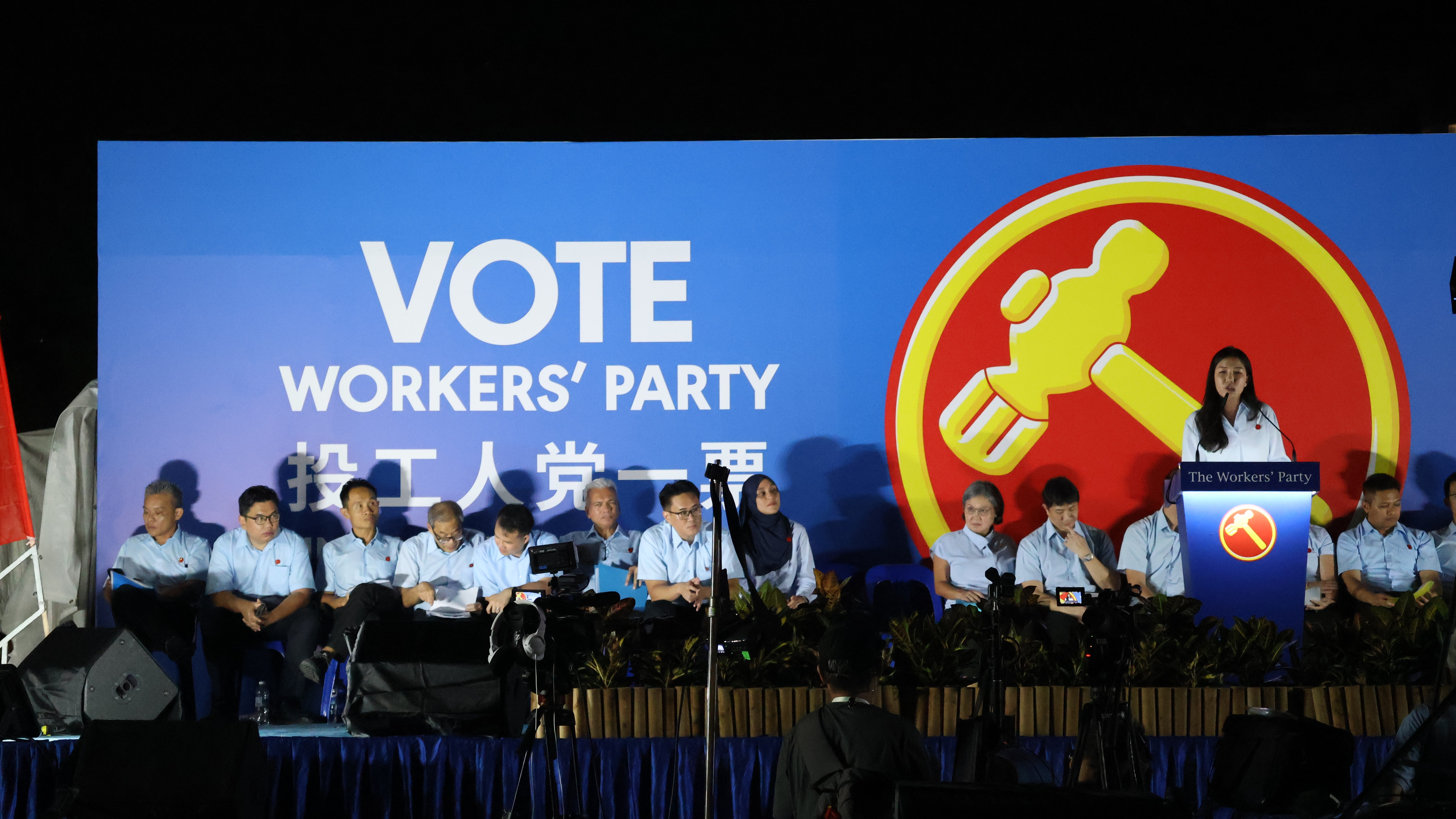
WP rally for Sengkang GRC on 24 April.

Ahead of the 2025 elections, Low announced on 7 December 2024 that he would retire from politics but would remain a member of the party's central executive committee, despite initially expressing interest for a return. In a recent CEC update on 30 June 2024, former MP Lee Li Lian, who was working as a councilor in Sengkang Town Council at the time, was reinstated into the CEC after a three-year absence, though Lee ultimately did not stand for the election.

After the release of new electoral boundaries, there was heavy speculation that the party would contest around 30 seats, along with their first contests in the seats of Tampines GRC and the carved-out Tampines Changkat SMC, as well as the new Marine Parade–Braddell Heights and Punggol GRCs. On 15 April, WP unveiled their manifesto titled "Working for Singapore". On 17 April, Singh said the party would contest 26 seats, less than a third of 97 parliamentary seats (their party's medium-term objective), which cited by Lim to be the "most promising" slate.

On nomination day, all but one previously existing MP remained in the team for their wards, the exception was Faisal Manap, who would contest Tampines GRC in a rare four-cornered fight against the PAP, the National Solidarity Party and the People's Power Party (PPP). Former Marine Parade GRC candidate Fadli Fawzi and newcomer Kenneth Tiong were fielded in Aljunied GRC alongside the incumbents (other than Faisal), while newcomer and AHTC property manager Abdul Muhaimin was fielded in Sengkang GRC alongside the incumbents. However, they did not contest Marine Parade–Braddell Heights GRC, citing limited resources and the extensive re-drawing of electoral boundaries in the area, which allowed the PAP team to be elected via a walkover, an occurrence last seen in 2011 with Tanjong Pagar GRC; this also attracted controversy and reactions from other opposition parties, who believed that every seat should be contested. WP responded to the controversy afterwards, stating that while they respected the views of the other opposition parties, they made decisions in the same "enlightened self-interest" as those parties. On 30 April, leaked screenshots of Telegram messages displayed Jalan Kayu SMC candidate Andre Low using profanities while criticising the civil service and several brands; he apologised thereafter.

The results saw the WP managing to retain all three of its constituencies despite a major national swing towards the PAP against non-WP opposition parties. While the WP saw a slight decline of 0.44% in the overall contested vote share, the party increased their overall popular vote to almost 15%. The party was narrowly defeated in Jalan Kayu SMC and Tampines GRC, garnering 48.53% and 47.37% of the votes respectively, and offered NCMP seats as a result of the close margins. These were respectively taken by Low and Eileen Chong on 19 May 2025; as a result, WP become the only opposition party to represent in Parliament for the second time in three Parliament terms since the 13th Parliament; for the fourth consecutive election since 2011, WP also surpassed their largest representation (of 12 seats) for any opposition party in Singapore since independence.

On 14 January 2026, more than one month after Singh's appeal was dismissed, Leader of the House Indranee Rajah filed a motion to declare Singh unsuitable as opposition leader and seek recommendations on whether his role should be rescinded. The motion was unanimously passed by the legislature, save for all 11 WP MPs present. This was despite the party whip being lifted; Chong, being absent, did not vote. Prime Minister Lawrence Wong subsequently stripped Singh's position on the following day, inviting the WP to nominate a replacement. However, Singh remained an MP and vowed to continue serving Singaporeans after the verdict.

Shortly after the announcement, WP launched a campaign hashtag #wecontinue, to continue efforts for outreach and support. The WP later rejected the offer through its website on 21 January, claiming that the leader of the largest opposition party in Parliament was themself the leader of the opposition; the Prime Minister's Office (PMO) later respected their decision, declaring the vacancy of the position on that date until the party was "ready to nominate someone to take on the responsibility".

Prior to Singh's removal of the position, WP CEC convened an internal disciplinary panel on 3 January, with the panel revealed on 20 January, which comprises Sengkang GRC MPs He, Lim, and former Hougang SMC MP Png Eng Huat. Investigations completed with the report handed over to the CEC; a notice to the special cadre members' conference was released on 30 April. The CEC decided there was a contravention of Articles 20(1) and 30 of the Party Constitution but without any intention, and the CEC issued a formal letter of reprimand. On 28 June, the CEC and four-fifths of the cadres (including Low) supported a vote of confidence, and Singh was re-elected for another two years as secretary-general. During the Parliament sitting on 7 July, House leader Rajah noted no further action would be taken against Lim and Faisal per the Constitution under the Parliament (Privileges, Immunities and Powers) Act 1962, since the case began at the previous Parliament term and ended on the succeeding term, coupled with both being cooperative in the findings, they could not be punished retroactively under it.

== Ideology ==
The WP espouses a centre-left and social democratic ideology, focusing on economic justice, inclusive governance and institutional accountability. Positioning itself as a "credible and constructive" opposition, the WP aims to contribute to national development while providing checks and balances on the ruling PAP. Rather than challenging the fundamentals of Singapore's political system, the WP advocates for gradual reforms within the existing framework, emphasising fairness, transparency and democratic participation.

The constitution of the WP defines the party's guiding principles from its early years as Merdeka (independence), parliamentary democracy and socialism. The party pledges that it will support policies presented in Parliament should they benefit Singaporeans on both sides of the political spectrum; however, if such policies are insufficient and either do not benefit or disadvantage Singaporeans, it will speak up in parliamentary debates to seek a compromise.

=== Economic policies ===
The WP has adapted its ideology to Singapore's unique economic and political context. Rather than advocating for an expansive welfare state, the WP supports targeted and sustainable social interventions aimed at reducing inequality and ensuring that "no Singaporean is left behind". This approach seeks to balance compassion with fiscal prudence, promoting social equity without compromising the country's economic competitiveness or encouraging dependency.

Key proposals under this framework include the introduction of a universal minimum wage, a more flexible Central Provident Fund (CPF) system to improve retirement adequacy and stronger support for healthcare, housing and childcare through "means-tested assistance". The party has also argued for measures to manage the cost of living, such as zero-rating essential items under the Goods and Services Tax (GST) and has proposed limited unemployment insurance to better support workers in transition. These policies are designed to uplift low- and middle-income Singaporeans, while maintaining personal responsibility and encouraging workforce participation. Philosophically, the WP is grounded in a belief in dignity in work, fairness and a stronger social compact. It emphasises that public policy should empower individuals while fostering community resilience. Rather than pursuing populist policies, the party frames itself as a rational and credible alternative to the ruling PAP, prioritising measured reforms and long-term national interest over ideological confrontation.

Historically influenced by Keynesian economics, the party favours government intervention in the economy and some redistribution of wealth. Taxation was seen as a means to achieve a "major redistribution of wealth and income" in previous manifestos. The party also desires increased rights for Singaporean workers, such as allocating greater expenditures towards the country's public healthcare system. Whereas the party leans left in general, it has also advocated for a more centrist calibrated approach in regards to immigration. For instance, in 2013 the party proposed that the overall number of foreign workers should be capped if Singapore can achieve a 1% annual growth rate in the local workforce.

=== Social policies ===
The WP promotes a more inclusive and participatory democracy. It has called for lowering the voting age from 21 to 18, reforming the electoral process to ensure greater fairness, enhanced transparency and public accountability in government. The WP also supports measured political liberalisation and a more open civic space. Its leaders regularly emphasise the party's role as a "rational and responsible" alternative to the PAP, grounded in the national interest rather than opposition for its own sake. The party's light blue campaign colours symbolise solidarity with blue-collar workers, highlighting its historic and continuing commitment to representing working-class interests.

== Leadership ==
=== List of chairpersons ===
No	Name	Term start	Term end	Tenure
1	David Marshall	3 November 1957	18 January 1963	5 years, 76 days
2	Chiang Seok Keong	10 May 1970	26 June 1971	1 year, 47 days
3	Heng Swee Tong	27 June 1971	27 April 1974	2 years, 304 days
4	Wong Hong Toy	28 April 1974	14 January 1978	3 years, 261 days
5	Lim Kang Chew	15 January 1978	8 March 1980	2 years, 53 days
6	Wong Hong Toy	9 March 1980	23 January 1988	7 years, 320 days
7	John Gan Eng Guan	24 January 1988	18 January 1992	3 years, 359 days
8	Tan Bin Seng	19 January 1992	31 May 2003	11 years, 132 days
9	Sylvia Lim	1 June 2003	Incumbent	23 years, 170 days

=== List of secretaries-general ===
No	Name	Term start	Term end	Tenure
1	Sum Choong Heng	1959	29 January 1961	1 year
2	Chua Chin Kiat	30 January 1961	11 July 1964	3 years, 163 days
3	Chong Chee Chong	12 July 1964	3 February 1968	3 years, 206 days
4	Wong Hong Toy	4 February 1968	9 May 1970	2 years, 94 days
5	Sum Choong Heng	10 May 1970	26 June 1971	1 year, 47 days
6	Joshua Benjamin Jeyaretnam	27 June 1971	26 May 2001	29 years, 333 days
7	Low Thia Khiang	27 May 2001	7 April 2018	16 years, 315 days
8	Pritam Singh	8 April 2018	Incumbent	8 years, 224 days

=== Central Executive Committee ===
As of 8 July 2026, the Central Executive Committee comprises the following members:

Title	Name
Chairperson	Sylvia Lim
Vice-chairperson	Faisal Manap
Secretary-General	Pritam Singh
Treasurer	Kenneth Tiong
Deputy Treasurer	Abdul Muhaimin
Organising Secretary	Dennis Tan
Organising Secretary	He Ting Ru
Deputy Organising Secretaries	Tan Kong Soon
Deputy Organising Secretaries	Fadli Fawzi
Head of Media Team	Louis Chua
Deputy Head of Media Team	Andre Low
Head of Policy Research Team	Jamus Lim
Deputy Head of Policy Research Team	Gerald Giam
President of Youth Wing	Eileen Chong
Committee Member	Low Thia Khiang
Committee Member	Harpreet Singh

== Former elected members ==
=== Former Members of City Council of Singapore (1957–1959) ===
No	Name	Constituency	Length of service (cumulative)
1	John Cruz Corera	Delta	1957–1959
2	Chang Yuen Tong	Kallang	1957–1959
3	O. Subramaniam Rengasamy	Cairnhill	1957–1959
4	Wang Tsun Hao	Telok Ayer	1957–1959
5	Govindasamy Gopal	Bukit Merah	1957–1959

=== Former Members of Legislative Assembly of Singapore (1955–1965) ===
No	Name	Constituency	Length of service (cumulative)
1	David Marshall	Anson	1961–1963

=== Former Members of Parliament of Singapore (1965–present) ===
No	Name	Constituency	Length of service (cumulative)
1	Joshua Benjamin Jeyaretnam	Anson	1981–1986
1	Joshua Benjamin Jeyaretnam	NCMP	1997–2001
2	Lee Siew Choh	NCMP	1988–1991
3	Yaw Shin Leong	Hougang SMC	2011–2012
4	Yee Jenn Jong	NCMP	2011–2015
5	Lee Li Lian	Punggol East SMC	2013–2015
6	Low Thia Khiang	Hougang SMC	1991–2020
6	Low Thia Khiang	Aljunied GRC	1991–2020
7	Chen Show Mao	Aljunied GRC	2011–2020
8	Png Eng Huat	Hougang SMC	2012–2020
9	Daniel Goh	NCMP	2015–2020
10	Raeesah Khan	Sengkang GRC	2020–2021
11	Leon Perera	Aljunied GRC	2015–2023
12	Faisal Manap	Aljunied GRC	2011–2025

== Members of Parliament ==
Name	Constituency
Dennis Tan	Hougang SMC
He Ting Ru	Sengkang GRC
Jamus Lim	Sengkang GRC
Louis Chua	Sengkang GRC
Abdul Muhaimin	Sengkang GRC
Pritam Singh	Aljunied GRC
Sylvia Lim	Aljunied GRC
Gerald Giam	Aljunied GRC
Fadli Fawzi	Aljunied GRC
Kenneth Tiong	Aljunied GRC
Andre Low	Non-Constituency Member of Parliament
Eileen Chong	Non-Constituency Member of Parliament

== Electoral performance ==
=== City Council ===
Election	Leader	Votes	%	Seats					Position	Result
Election	Leader	Votes	%	Contested			Total	+/–	Position	Result
Election	Leader	Votes	%	Seats	Won	Lost	Total	+/–	Position	Result
1957	David Marshall^{1}	11,896	7.4%	5	4	1	4 / 32	▲4	▲4th	Opposition

=== Legislative Assembly ===
Election	Leader	Votes	%	Seats					Position	Result
Election	Leader	Votes	%	Contested			Total	+/–	Position	Result
Election	Leader	Votes	%	Seats	Won	Lost	Total	+/–	Position	Result
1959	David Marshall	4,127	0.8%	3	0	3	0 / 51	Steady	▲6th	No seats
1963	Chua Chin Kiat	286	0.1%	3	0	3	0 / 51	Steady	▼8th	No seats

=== Parliament ===
Election	Leader	Votes	%	Seats					NCMPs	Position	Result
Election	Leader	Votes	%	Contested			Total	+/–	NCMPs	Position	Result
Election	Leader	Votes	%	Seats	Won	Lost	Total	+/–	NCMPs	Position	Result
1968	Chiang Seok Keong^{2}	3,049	4.02%	2	0	2	0 / 58	Steady	—N/a	▲2nd	No seats
1972	J. B. Jeyaretnam^{3}	90,885	12.20%	27	0	27	0 / 65	Steady	—N/a	2nd	No seats
1976	J. B. Jeyaretnam^{3}	91,966	11.55%	22	0	22	0 / 69	Steady	—N/a	2nd	No seats
1980	J. B. Jeyaretnam^{3}	39,590	6.22%	8	0	8	0 / 75	Steady	—N/a	2nd	No seats
1984	J. B. Jeyaretnam^{3}	110,868	12.65%	15	1	14	1 / 79	▲1	0 / 1	2nd	Opposition
1988	J. B. Jeyaretnam^{3}	224,473	16.72%	32	0	32	0 / 81	▼1	2 / 2	2nd	No seats (with NCMPs)^{4}
1991	J. B. Jeyaretnam^{3}	112,010	14.29%	13	1	12	1 / 81	▲1	—N/a	▼3rd	Opposition
1997	J. B. Jeyaretnam^{3}	101,544	14.17%	14	1	13	1 / 83	Steady	1 / 1	▲2nd	Opposition
2001	Low Thia Khiang	19,060	3.05%	2	1	1	1 / 84	Steady	0 / 1	▼3rd	Opposition
2006	Low Thia Khiang	183,578	16.34%	20	1	19	1 / 84	Steady	1 / 1	▲2nd	Opposition
2011	Low Thia Khiang	258,510	12.83%	23	6	17	6 / 87	▲5	2 / 3	2nd	Opposition
2015	Low Thia Khiang	282,143	12.48%	28	6	22	6 / 89	Steady	3 / 3	2nd	Opposition
2020	Pritam Singh	279,922	11.22%	21	10	11	10 / 93	▲4	0 / 2	2nd	Opposition
2025	Pritam Singh	359,161	14.99%	26	10	16	10 / 97	Steady	2 / 2	2nd	Opposition

==== Seats contested ====
Constituencies won are in bold.

Election	Constituencies contested	Contested vote %	+/–
1959	Cairnhill, Stamford, (Note: Loss of candidate election deposit(s) in contested seat(s)) Tiong Bahru	0.79%	—N/a
1963	Anson, Bras Basah, Crawford	0.05%	▼0.74%
1968	Jalan Kayu, Nee Soon	13.2%	▲11.25%
1972	Alexandra, Aljunied, Anson, Bukit Ho Swee, Bukit Merah, Bukit Panjang, Changi, Crawford, Farrer Park, Geylang East, Geylang West, Jalan Kayu, Kampong Chai Chee, Kampong Kembangan, Kim Keat, Kim Seng, Leng Kee, MacPherson, Moulmein, Paya Lebar, Potong Pasir, Queenstown, Siglap, Stamford, Telok Blangah, Tiong Bahru	24.5%	▲11.3%
1976	Alexandra, Aljunied, Bukit Panjang, Changi, Chua Chu Kang, Geylang East, Havelock, Henderson, Jalan Kayu, Joo Chiat, Kampong Chai Chee, Kampong Kembangan, Kim Seng, Moulmein, Pasir Panjang, Paya Lebar, Potong Pasir, Punggol, Radin Mas, River Valley, Serangoon Gardens, Whampoa	27.9%	▲3.4%
1980	Cheng San, Henderson, Jalan Kayu, Kim Seng, Pasir Panjang, Radin Mas, Siglap, Telok Blangah	29.2%	▲1.3%
1984	Alexandra, **Anson**, Brickworks, Chua Chu Kang, Delta, Henderson, Jalan Besar, Jalan Kayu, Kallang, Kampong Kembangan, Kim Seng, Kolam Ayer, Leng Kee, Pasir Panjang, Radin Mas, Telok Blangah	42.0%	▲12.8%
1988	3-member GRC: Bedok, Brickworks, Eunos, Jalan Besar, Pasir Panjang, Tiong Bahru; SMC: Ayer Rajah, Bukit Merah, Changi, Chua Chu Kang, Fengshan, Hougang, Kallang, Kampong Glam, Kim Seng, Kreta Ayer, Leng Kee, Moulmein, Siglap, Telok Blangah	38.5%	▼3.4%
1991	4-member GRC: Bedok, Eunos; SMC: Bukit Merah, Bukit Timah, Changi, Jurong, **Hougang**	41.1%	▲2.6%
1997	5-member GRC: Cheng San; 4-member GRC: Pasir Ris, West Coast; SMC: **Hougang**	37.6%	▼3.5%
2001	SMC: **Hougang**, Nee Soon East	34.3%	▼3.3%
2006	6-member GRC: Ang Mo Kio; 5-member GRC: Aljunied, East Coast; SMC: **Hougang**, Joo Chiat, Nee Soon Central, Nee Soon East	38.4%	▲4.1%
2011	5-member GRC: **Aljunied**, East Coast, Nee Soon; 4-member GRC: Moulmein-Kallang; SMC: **Hougang**, Joo Chiat, Punggol East, Sengkang West	46.6%	▲8.2%
2015	5-member GRC: **Aljunied**, Marine Parade, Nee Soon; 4-member GRC: East Coast, Jalan Besar; SMC: Fengshan, **Hougang**, MacPherson, Punggol East, Sengkang West	39.8%	▼6.8%
2020	5-member GRC: **Aljunied**, East Coast, Marine Parade; 4-member GRC: **Sengkang**; SMC: **Hougang**, Punggol West	**50.49%**	▲10.7%
2025	5-member GRC: **Aljunied**, East Coast, Tampines; 4-member GRC: **Sengkang**, Punggol; SMC: **Hougang**, Jalan Kayu, Tampines Changkat	**50.06%**	▼0.43%

=== By-elections ===
City Council by-elections

Election	Leader	Constituency contested	Votes	%	Seats				Result
Election	Leader	Constituency contested	Votes	%	Contested		Total	+/–	Result
Election	Leader	Constituency contested	Votes	%	Won	Lost	Total	+/–	Result
1958	David Marshall	Kallang City Ward	304	3.7%	0	1	0 / 1	▼1	Lost

Legislative Assembly

Election	Leader	Constituency contested	Votes	%	Seats				Result
Election	Leader	Constituency contested	Votes	%	Contested		Total	+/–	Result
Election	Leader	Constituency contested	Votes	%	Won	Lost	Total	+/–	Result
1961	David Marshall	Anson	3,598	43.3%	1	0	1 / 1	▲1	Won

Parliament

Election	Leader	Constituency contested	Votes	%	Seats				Result
Election	Leader	Constituency contested	Votes	%	Contested		Total	+/–	Result
Election	Leader	Constituency contested	Votes	%	Won	Lost	Total	+/–	Result
1977	J. B. Jeyaretnam	Radin Mas SMC	5,021	29.4%	0	1	0 / 2	Steady	Lost
1979	J. B. Jeyaretnam	Telok Blangah SMC	8,036	38.8%	0	1	0 / 7	Steady	Lost
1981	J. B. Jeyaretnam	Anson SMC	7,012	51.9%	1	0	1 / 1	▲1	Won
2012	Low Thia Khiang	Hougang SMC	13,460	62.1%	1	0	1 / 1	Steady	Won
2013	Low Thia Khiang	Punggol East SMC	16,038	54.5%	1	0	1 / 1	▲1	Won

1. Marshall did not contest the 1957 city elections.
2. Chiang did not contest in the 1968 election.
3. Jeyaretnam did not contest the 1988 and 1991 elections due to pressed charges.
4. A candidate who was offered a post in the NCMP was disqualified shortly before accepting the offer due to pressed charges.

== See also ==
- Labour movement of Singapore
- List of political parties in Singapore
- Politics of Singapore
- Social democracy
