= Louis Chua =

Singaporean politician (born 1987)

The Honourable Louis Chua
- 蔡庆威
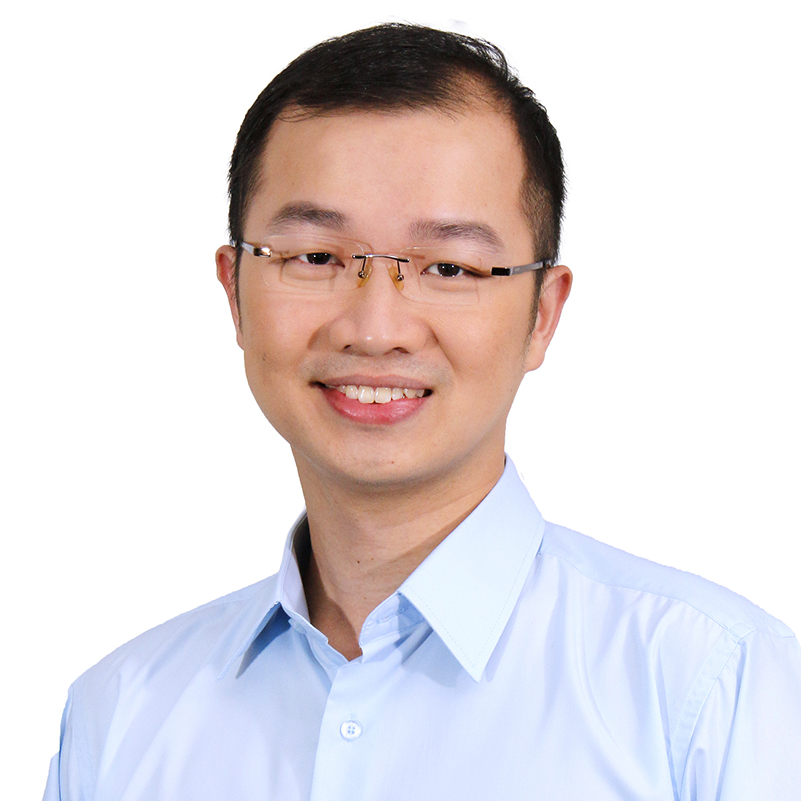
- Official portrait, 2021

Member of Parliament for Sengkang GRC
- Incumbent
- Assumed office 10 July 2020
- Preceded by: Constituency established
- Majority: 2020: 4,898 (4.24%); 2025: 14,942 (12.64%)

Head of Media Team of the Workers' Party
- Incumbent
- Assumed office 17 July 2024
- Preceded by: Leon Perera

Personal details
- Born: Chua Kheng Wee; 1987 (age 38–39) Singapore
- Party: Workers' Party
- Children: 2
- Education: Singapore Management University (BAcy, BBM)
- Occupation: Politician; equity research analyst

Louis Chua Kheng Wee (Note: Chinese: 蔡庆威; Pe̍h-ōe-jī: Chhòa Khèng-ui; pinyin: Cài Qìngweī) (born 1987) is a Singaporean politician and equity research analyst. A member of the Workers' Party (WP), Chua has been the Member of Parliament (MP) for the Rivervale division of Sengkang Group Representation Constituency (GRC) since 2020.

== Early life ==
Chua attended Townsville Primary School and Anderson Secondary School. He subsequently attended Hwa Chong Institution.

Prior to starting his career, Chua obtained a double degree in accountancy and business at the Singapore Management University. He is a certified chartered accountant in Singapore and ASEAN.

== Career ==
Chua is an equity research analyst.

=== Politics ===
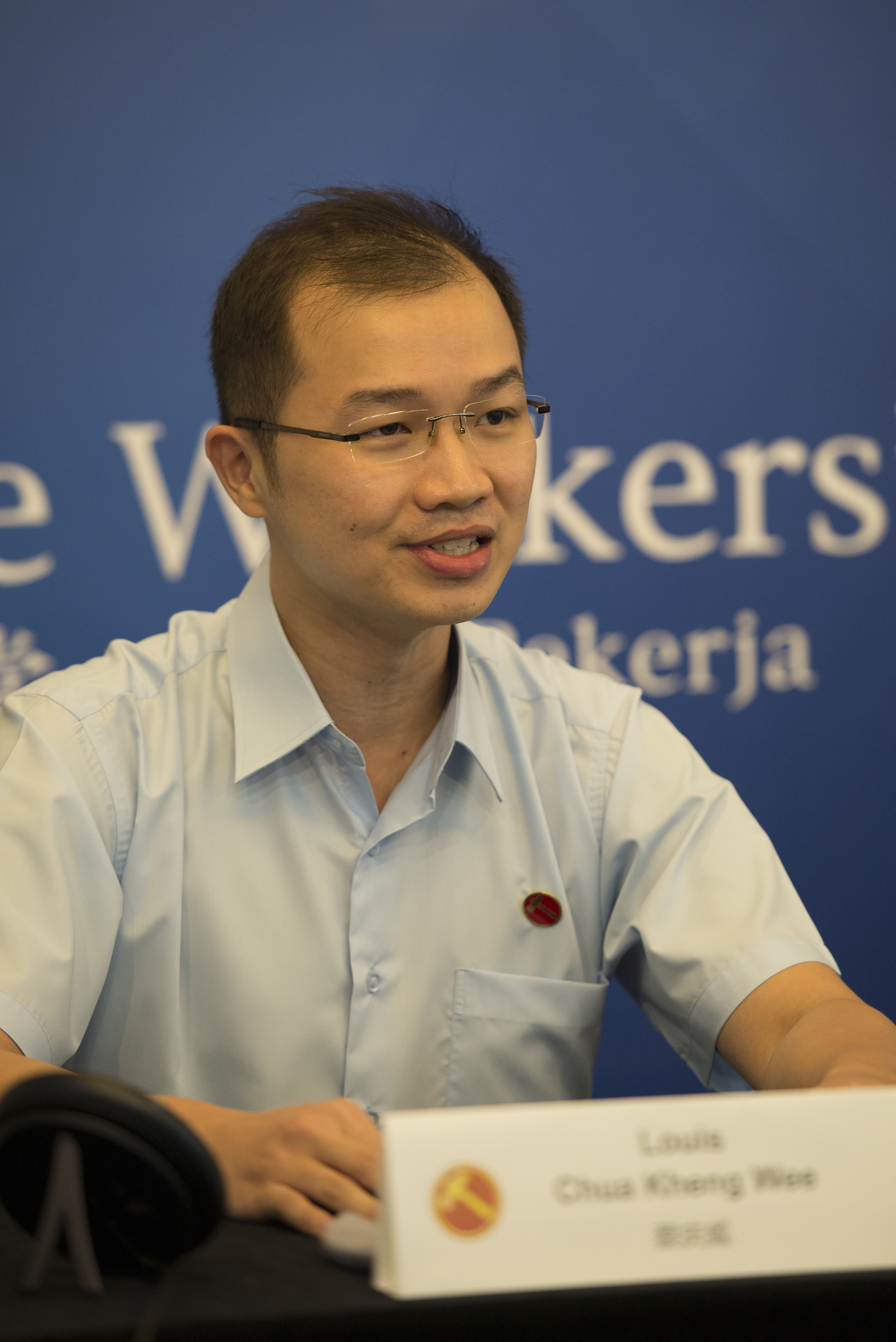
Chua at a press conference in 2020

During the 2020 general election, Chua was fielded as part of the WP team for Sengkang GRC alongside He Ting Ru, Raeesah Khan and Jamus Lim against Ng Chee Meng and his team representing the governing People's Action Party (PAP). The WP defeated the PAP in an upset victory after garnering 52.12% of the vote.

Chua was elected to the Central Executive Committee (CEC) of the WP as Head of Media Team in 2020.

During the 2025 general election, Chua was in a four-member WP team and contested in Sengkang GRC with He Ting Ru, Jamus Lim, and Abdul Muhaimin and won the GRC with 56.32% of the votes. Chua was elected as Member of Parliament representing Sengkang GRC in the 15th Parliament.

==== Sengkang Town Council ====
Chua has served as the Vice-Chairman of the Sengkang Town Council (SKTC) since 2020 to 2025.

=== Political positions ===
On 3 September 2020, Lim gave his maiden speech in Parliament. He asserted that there was "insufficient compassion in our policymaking process" and proposed that Singapore could implement a "simple, across-the-board minimum wage".

== Personal life ==
Chua has been married since 2017 and is a father of two boys, born in September 2019 and November 2021, respectively.

== Notes ==
Parliament of Singapore
New constituency	Member of Parliament for Sengkang GRC; 2020-present Served alongside: (2020-2025): He Ting Ru, Jamus Lim, Raeesah Khan (2025-present): He Ting Ru, Jamus Lim, Abdul Muhaimin	Incumbent
