= He Ting Ru =

Singaporean politician (born 1983)

The Honourable He Ting Ru
- 何廷儒
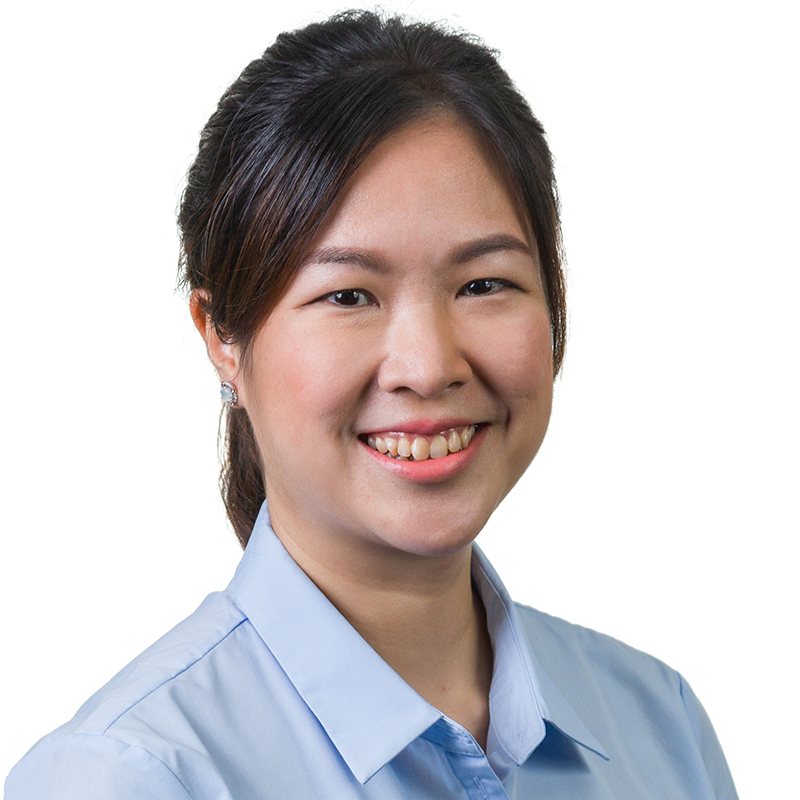
- Official portrait, 2021

Member of Parliament for Sengkang GRC
- Incumbent
- Assumed office 10 July 2020
- Preceded by: Constituency established
- Majority: 2020: 4,898 (4.24%); 2025: 14,942 (12.64%)

Organising Secretary of the Workers' Party
- Incumbent
- Assumed office 7 July 2026 Serving with Dennis Tan

Personal details
- Born: 16 June 1983 (age 43) Singapore
- Party: Workers' Party
- Spouse: Terence Tan (m. 2016)
- Children: 3
- Education: CHIJ Saint Nicholas Girls' School; University of Cambridge (BA)
- Occupation: Politician; lawyer

He Ting Ru (Note: Chinese: 何廷儒; pinyin: Hé Tíngrú) (born 16 June 1983) is a Singaporean politician and lawyer. A member of the Workers' Party (WP), Ru has been the Member of Parliament (MP) representing the Buangkok division of Sengkang Group Representation Constituency (GRC) since 2020.

== Early life ==
He Ting Ru was born on 16 June 1983. She attended CHIJ Saint Nicholas Girls' School and Raffles Junior College before graduating from the University of Cambridge with a Bachelor of Arts degree in natural sciences. After graduating from university, she completed the Graduate Diploma in Law and Legal Practice Course, qualifying as a lawyer in the jurisdiction of England and Wales.

== Political career ==
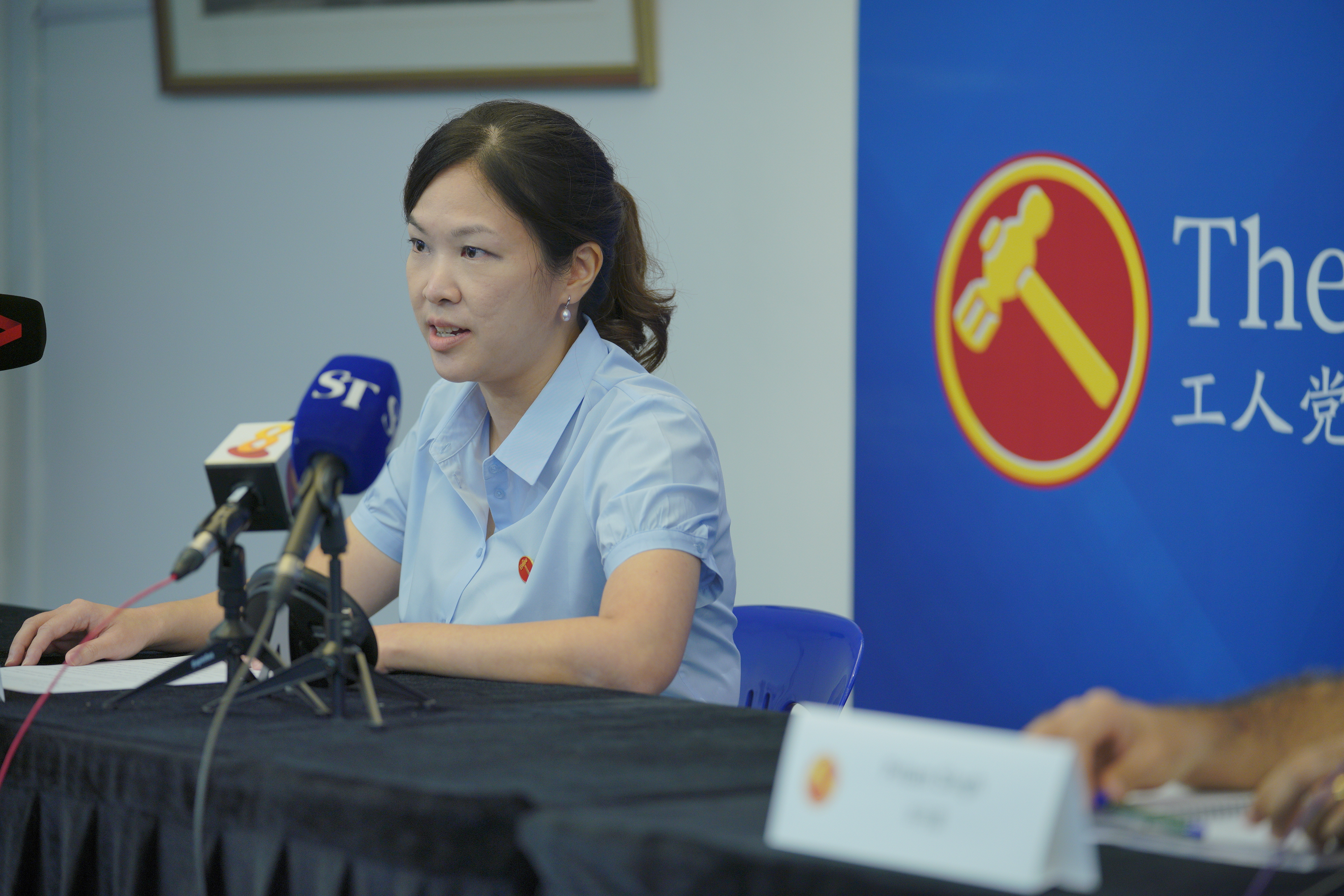
He at a press conference in 2020

He Ting Ru began volunteering with the WP in the Paya Lebar division of Aljunied GRC after the 2011 general election. She made her political debut in the 2015 general election as part of a five-member team in Marine Parade GRC. They lost to the PAP with 35.93% of the vote.

She previously served as Secretary of the Workers' Party Youth Wing, and oversaw the Youth Wing's outreach efforts in the areas of service, education and heritage.

On 8 July 2026, Ru was elected into the Central Executive Council (CEC) of the WP as an organising secretary.

=== Sengkang Town Council ===
Ru has served as the Chairman of the Sengkang Town Council (SKTC) since 2020.

=== 2020–present: Member of Parliament ===
During the 2020 general election, she led a four-member WP team contesting in Sengkang GRC with team members Jamus Lim, Louis Chua and Raeesah Khan. On 11 July, she was elected as a Member of Parliament (MP) for Sengkang GRC.

She was elected to the party's Central Executive Committee (CEC) as Treasurer and appointed as the Chairwoman of the Sengkang Town Council (SKTC) since 2020.

He Ting Ru has advocated for reform of the public health system, intervention on cost of living issues, and various political accountability issues in Singapore.

In 2020, she supported a motion by Aljunied MP Sylvia Lim pertaining to the issues raised by a major court case involving Parti Liyani, a domestic worker who worked for former Changi Airport and Surbana Jurong Chairman Liew Mun Leong. The motion called on the Government to "...recognise and remedy its shortcomings in order to enhance justice for all, regardless of means or social status, including facilitating a review of the justice system." During the debate she pushed for the creation of a publicly funded Public Defender's Office and for statutory compensation for miscarriages of justice. In response to the motion, PAP MP Murali Pillai put forth amendments removing the call for a review of the Singaporean justice system, which WP MPs dissented against.

In 2021, He Ting Ru raised a motion on gender equality with then Aljunied MP Leon Perera.

During the Foreign Interference (Countermeasures) Act 2021 debate, she tabled amendments to the bill introducing judicial oversight with hearings to be held in camera. The amendments were rejected by the Government.

She also tabled amendments to the Carbon Pricing (Amendment) Bill in 2022, proposing the listing on a public registry of businesses permitted to exceed the limit on the use of international carbon credits. The Government rejected the amendment, citing the need for business confidentiality.

In 2024, He Ting Ru raised an adjournment motion pushing for tougher regulations and economic interventions in order to tackle the impact of urban heat in Singapore.

During the 2025 general election, Ru was in a four-member WP team and contested in Sengkang GRC with Jamus Lim, Louis Chua, and Abdul Muhaimin and won the GRC with 56.32% of the votes. Ru was elected as Member of Parliament representing Sengkang GRC in the 15th Parliament.

== Legal career ==
Since 2013, He Ting Ru has been Head of Legal and Communications of a listed multinational company which oversees legal and communications matters in Asia, North America, Europe and Africa.

She was trained at and worked as a solicitor at the law firm Clifford Chance, working in London and Frankfurt, before joining a European financial institution in Singapore as a derivatives lawyer.

== Personal life ==
She married Terence Tan Li Chern, a fellow WP member in 2016. The couple were part of the five-member WP team contesting Marine Parade GRC in 2015. They have three sons.

== Notes ==
Parliament of Singapore
New constituency	Member of Parliament for Sengkang GRC; 2020-present Served alongside: (2020-2025): Jamus Lim, Raeesah Khan, Louis Chua (2025-present): Jamus Lim, Abdul Muhaimin, Louis Chua	Incumbent
