= Raeesah Khan =

Singaporean activist and former politician

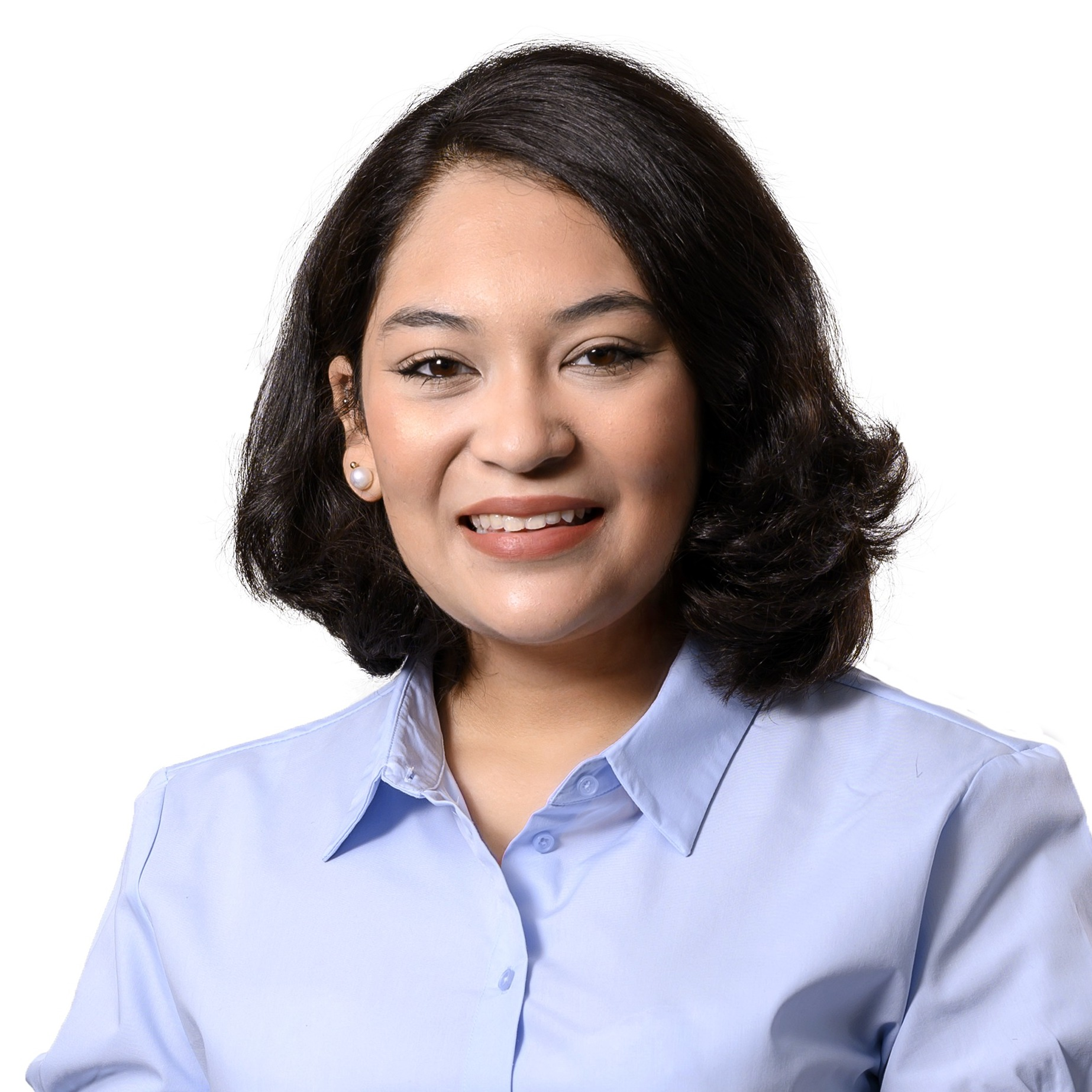
- Official portrait, 2019

Member of the Singapore Parliament for Sengkang GRC
- In office 10 July 2020 – 30 November 2021
- Preceded by: Constituency established
- Succeeded by: WP held
- Majority: 4,898 (4.24%)

Personal details
- Born: Raeesah Begum bte Farid Khan; 10 November 1993 (age 33) Singapore
- Other political affiliations: Workers' Party (2018–2021)
- Spouse: Mahadhir Caffoor (m. 2018)
- Children: 2
- Education: Murdoch University (Bcom.)
- Occupation: Social activist; Former politician

Raeesah Begum binte Farid Khan (born 10 November 1993) is a Singaporean social activist and former politician. A former member of the opposition Workers' Party (WP), she was the Member of Parliament (MP) for the Compassvale division of Sengkang Group Representation Constituency (GRC) between 2020 and 2021.

In 2016, Raeesah founded the Reyna Movement, an organisation offering up-skilling programs and community engagement to marginalised women and children. She joined the WP in 2018, having been a volunteer for its grassroots activities.

In the 2020 general election, Raeesah stood in Sengkang GRC as part of a four-member WP team, which defeated the governing People's Action Party (PAP) in an upset. Prior to polling day, two police reports were filed against her, alleging that she had made inappropriate online comments on Singaporean racial and religious discrimination. On 17 September, she received a formal warning from the police for said online comments.

Starting from 3 August 2021, Raeesah falsely alleged on multiple occasions that a police officer inappropriately commented on a rape victim she had accompanied to a police station. On 30 November 2021, she resigned from Parliament and the WP after acknowledging that the allegation was false.

== Early life ==
Raeesah is the daughter of ethnic Malay parents of mixed-race ancestry. Her father, Farid Khan bin Kaim Khan, is a marine service businessman of mixed Indian-Pakistani descent and a candidate in the 2017 presidential election. His wife, Naeemah Shaik bte Abu Bakar, is of Arab descent. She has a younger brother, Yusuf Khan.

Raeesah studied economics and marketing at Murdoch University.

== Career ==
In 2016, Raeesah founded the Reyna Movement, an organisation aiming to empower marginalised women and children through up-skilling programs and community engagement. It has worked with women's shelters, the homeless, at-risk children and low-income families in Singapore.

=== Political career ===
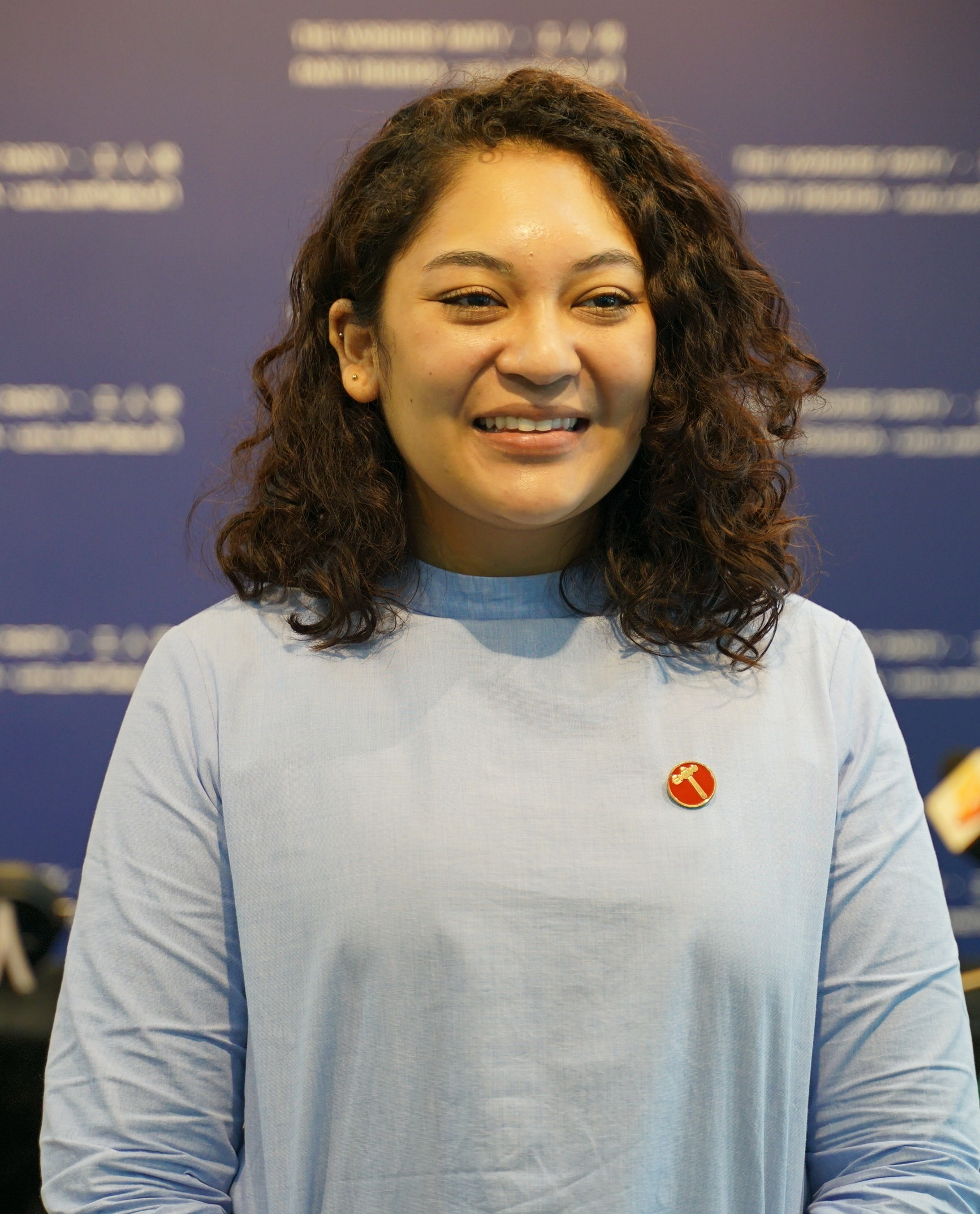
Raeesah at a press conference in 2020

Raeesah became a member of the WP in 2018, having previously volunteered in the party's grassroots activities. On 30 June 2020, she, Jamus Lim, He Ting Ru, and Louis Chua were announced as the party's candidates for Sengkang GRC in the 2020 general election. She was also the youngest WP candidate in the general election.

Before Polling Day, two separate police reports were lodged against Raeesah for allegedly making two online comments, both regarding racial and religious discrimination. The WP later supported Raeesah; she also apologised and released a statement stating that her intention was "never to cause social divisions but to raise awareness on minority issues", adding that she regretted her "insensitive" comments. Netizens claimed that the resurfacing of her past comments was a political move, with hashtags such as "#IStandWithRaeesah" trending on Twitter.

At the election, the WP team won 52.12% of the vote, defeating the governing People's Action Party (PAP) in an upset victory that secured a second GRC for the WP.

On 17 September of the same year, the Singapore Police Force (SPF) issued her with a warning over her reported posts.

==== Allegations against the police ====
On 3 August 2021, Raeesah made an allegation against the SPF during a parliamentary debate on empowering women. She alleged that, in 2018, a police officer made inappropriate comments about a 25-year-old rape victim whom she had accompanied to make a police report, and gave recommendations to increase sensitivity in investigations. Desmond Tan, Minister of State for Home Affairs, subsequently called the allegations "serious" and "[needing] investigation". When asked for details, Raeesah declined, saying that she did not wish to retraumatise the victim, affirming that the anecdote was not an isolated case. She also agreed to file a parliamentary question if it was about questions related to the issue, adding that the speech was not to cast aspersions on the police and clarifying later that the police can be the solution. She also said she was unsuccessful in contacting the victim after the incident happened, adding that she would communicate directly with the Ministry of Home Affairs in the future if a similar situation occurred.

On 4 October, K. Shanmugam, Minister for Law and Home Affairs, said the police had checked their records and found no cases that fit Raeesah's description; he asked her to provide more details about the alleged mishandling of the case. In response, Raeesah reaffirmed her statement but, citing concerns about confidentiality, declined to reveal any further details, including the police station they went to. On 20 October, the police said that an extensive search had not managed to identify the case in question, adding that Raeesah had also not responded to their requests to provide more details about the case.

On 1 November, Raeesah admitted that she had lied on three occasions about the alleged incident in Parliament. She had not accompanied the victim to make a police report, and had heard about the incident from a support group for women who had been victims of sexual assault. She also did not have the victim's consent to share the incident in Parliament. In explaining why she had lied, Raeesah claimed that she had been sexually assaulted at 18 while studying abroad. In response, Leader of the House Indranee Rajah expressed sympathy towards Raeesah but raised an official complaint against her for breaching parliamentary privilege and asked for the matter to be referred to the Committee of Privileges. As Indranee and Shanmugam recused themselves from the committee on a one-time basis, Edwin Tong, Minister for Culture, Community and Youth, and Rahayu Mahzam, Parliamentary Secretary for Communications and Information and Health, were nominated to the committee by Speaker Tan Chuan-Jin. Later on, Senior Minister of State for Defence and Manpower Zaqy Mohamad was appointed to replace Minister for Social and Family Development Masagos Zulkifli, who recused himself too.

The following day, the WP approved the formation of a separate disciplinary panel to investigate Raeesah's conduct, chaired by Pritam Singh, Sylvia Lim and Faisal Manap.

==== Resignation ====
On 30 November 2021, Raeesah resigned from the WP, and hence lost her parliamentary seat, following the probe over her admission of lying. Despite the resignation, the COP announced that it would continue its investigation.

Two days later, Singh announced at a press conference that, despite having known in the week after her speech that her allegation was false, the WP leadership allowed Raeesah to "clarify herself" in Parliament. Such a statement was supposed to be made in September, but a shingles episode obstructed it; upon her return to Parliament on 4 October, she instead repeated the allegation. He said that, before Raeesah's resignation, the leadership had voted overwhelmingly to ask her to resign, and that she would have otherwise been expelled. Instead, she informed him that she would resign, shortly before the central executive committee (CEC) was due to meet on the matter. He also said that she had been instructed to substantiate the allegation readily.

The remaining MPs for Sengkang GRC did not resign to facilitate a by-election; each would represent a portion of the Compassvale division, which Raeesah had represented before her resignation. Faisal, as an incumbent MP for Aljunied GRC, was also made an advisor to the Sengkang MPs; Singh said that this addressed concerns on the lack of a minority MP for Sengkang GRC. (Note: Every team in a GRC is legally required to contain at least one minority (i.e. non-Chinese) candidate, either Malay or Indian/other (other being not Chinese, Malay or Indian). The mandatory minority category in a GRC is determined by the President. The number of GRCs requiring Malay candidates at a general election must be three-fifths of the total number of GRCs, or, if that is fractional, the next highest whole number.) The party said that, while it was not deterred by Raeesah's resignation from selecting "young and progressive candidates", it would review its candidate selection process and oversight of speeches.

==== Investigations by the Committee of Privileges ====
After investigations, on 10 February 2022, the Committee of Privileges recommended that Raeesah be fined S$35,000, with Singh and Faisal being referred to the Public Prosecutor for prosecution. A parliamentary debate was held on 15 February, with the recommendations accepted. On 29 April, the case was referred to the Police to allow them to interview further witnesses related to the case.

== Personal life ==
Raeesah married Mahadhir Caffoor in 2018. They have a son and daughter.

== Notes ==
Parliament of Singapore
New constituency	Member of Parliament for Sengkang GRC; 2020–2021; Served alongside: He Ting Ru, Jamus Lim, Louis Chua	Succeeded by He Ting Ru; Jamus Lim; Abdul Muhaimin; Louis Chua
