= Review of Pacific Basin Financial Markets and Policies =

- Discipline: Finance, Economics, Accountancy
- Language: English
- Edited by: Cheng-Few Lee

Publication details
- History: 1998-present
- Publisher: World Scientific (Singapore)

Standard abbreviations
- ISO 4: Rev. Pac. Basin Financ. Mark. Polic.

Indexing
- ISSN: 1793-6705

Links
- Journal homepage

The Review of Pacific Basin Financial Markets and Policies (RPBFMP) is an international journal covering interdisciplinary research in finance, economics and accounting, especially among the countries in the Pacific Rim. Launched in 1998, it is currently published by World Scientific. Topics include: business, economic and financial relations between countries; financial markets and industries; options and futures markets; global monetary and foreign exchange policy, and the like.

The current managing editor, Cheng-Few Lee, has been featured in the Most Prolific Authors in the Finance Literature: 1959-2008.

== Abstracting and indexing ==
The journal is abstracted and indexed in:

- The Bibliography of Asian Studies
- Social Science Research Network (SSRN)
- Finance Literature Index (FLI)
- The CFA Digest (= Chartered Financial Analysts Digest)
- International Bibliography of the Social Sciences (IBSS)
- Joint Electronic Library, JEL on CD, e-JEL, and EconLit (= search engine of the American Economic Association)
