= Sengkang Group Representation Constituency =

Electoral division in Singapore

Sengkang
- Group representation constituency for the Parliament of Singapore
- Region: North-East Region, Singapore
- Electorate: 126,808

Current constituency
- Created: 13 March 2020; 6 years ago
- Seats: 4
- Party: Workers' Party
- Members: Abdul Muhaimin; Louis Chua; He Ting Ru; Jamus Lim
- Town Council: Sengkang
- Created from: Pasir Ris–Punggol GRC; Punggol East SMC; Sengkang West SMC

The Sengkang Group Representation Constituency is a four-member group representation constituency (GRC) in north-eastern Singapore. It has four divisions: Anchorvale, Buangkok, Compassvale and Rivervale, managed by Sengkang Town Council. The current Members of Parliament (MPs) for the constituency are Abdul Muhaimin, Louis Chua, He Ting Ru and Jamus Lim from the Workers' Party (WP).

== History ==
=== 2020: Creation and WP upset victory ===
Sengkang GRC was created prior to the 2020 general election from the bulk of Sengkang West Single Member Constituency (SMC), the entirety of Punggol East SMC and the Sengkang Central division of Pasir Ris–Punggol GRC.

In an upset, the WP team, comprising Louis Chua, He Ting Ru, Jamus Lim and Raeesah Khan, won the GRC, marking the second opposition victory in a GRC since the introduction of GRCs in 1988. They won 52.12% of the vote, defeating Ng Chee Meng and his team representing the governing People's Action Party (PAP).

After their victory, the WP divided the GRC into the divisions of Anchorvale, Buangkok, Compassvale and Rivervale.

==== Resignation of Raeesah Khan ====
On 30 November 2021, Raeesah resigned as a WP member, effectively expelling herself from Parliament, after making unsubstantiated allegations against the police in Parliament on three occasions. After her resignation, the Compassvale division was physically divided among the remaining three MPs for Sengkang GRC. At the same time, Faisal Manap, incumbent MP for Aljunied GRC, became a temporary advisor to the Sengkang GRC team, which party leader Pritam Singh claimed addressed concerns on the lack of a minority MP for the GRC. (Note: Every team in a GRC is legally required to contain at least one minority (i.e. non-Chinese) candidate, either Malay or Indian/other (other being not Chinese, Malay or Indian). The mandatory minority category in a GRC is determined by the President. The number of GRCs requiring Malay candidates at a general election must be three-fifths of the total number of GRCs, or, if that is fractional, the next highest whole number.)

=== 2025: WP entrenchment ===
On 27 March 2022, the PAP team for Sengkang GRC was revamped with Lam Pin Min remaining; Ng, Amrin Amin and Raymond Lye were replaced with Elmie Nekmat, Theodora Lai, and Ling Weihong. Ling was later replaced by Marcus Loh in October 2023, who was himself replaced by Bernadette Giam in January 2025. After the appointment of Giam, the PAP confirmed their final lineup for the 2025 general election.

Prior to the same election, the WP announced that Abdul Muhaimin, a senior property manager at WP-held Aljunied–Hougang Town Council, would be nominated to represent the Compassvale division, running alongside the incumbent MPs. Despite a national swing towards the PAP, the WP retained the GRC with 56.32% of the vote, a positive swing of over 4%.

== Members of Parliament ==
Divisions or wards of Sengkang GRC as of the 2025 general election:
1 Anchorvale
2 Buangkok
3 Compassvale
4 Rivervale

Election	Divisions	Members of Parliament	Party
Formation
2020	Anchorvale; Buangkok; Compassvale; Rivervale	Jamus Lim; He Ting Ru; Raeesah Khan (2020-2021) (Note: Resigned from Parliament in 2021 after her allegations against the police.); Louis Chua	WP
2025	Anchorvale; Buangkok; Compassvale; Rivervale	Jamus Lim; He Ting Ru; Abdul Muhaimin; Louis Chua	WP

== Electoral results ==
Note: The Elections Department does not include rejected votes when calculating the vote shares of candidates. Hence, all candidates' vote shares will total to 100% at any given election (may not appear so in multi-way contests due to rounding).

=== Elections in 2020s ===
General Election 2020
Party	Candidate	Votes	%
WP	Louis Chua He Ting Ru Jamus Lim Raeesah Khan	60,217	52.12
PAP	Amrin Amin Lam Pin Min Raymond Lye Ng Chee Meng	55,319	47.88
Majority		4,898	4.24
Total valid votes		115,536	98.98
Rejected ballots		1,194	1.02
Turnout		116,730	97.19
Registered electors		120,100	
WP win (new seat)			

General Election 2025
Party	Candidate	Votes	%	±%
WP	Abdul Muhaimin Louis Chua He Ting Ru Jamus Lim	66,599	56.32	▲4.20
PAP	Elmie Nekmat Bernadette Giam Theodora Lai Lam Pin Min	51,657	43.68	▼4.20
Majority		14,942	12.64	▲8.40
Total valid votes		118,256	99.22	▲0.24
Rejected ballots		927	0.78	▼0.24
Turnout		119,183	93.99	▼3.20
Registered electors		126,808		▲5.59
WP hold		Swing	▲4.20	
