= Marsiling =

Name transcription(s)
  - Chinese: 马西岭 (Simplified) 馬西嶺 (Traditional); Mǎxīlǐng (Pinyin); Má-se-léng (Hokkien POJ)
  - Malay: Marsiling
  - Tamil: மார்சிலிங் Mārciliṅ (Transliteration)
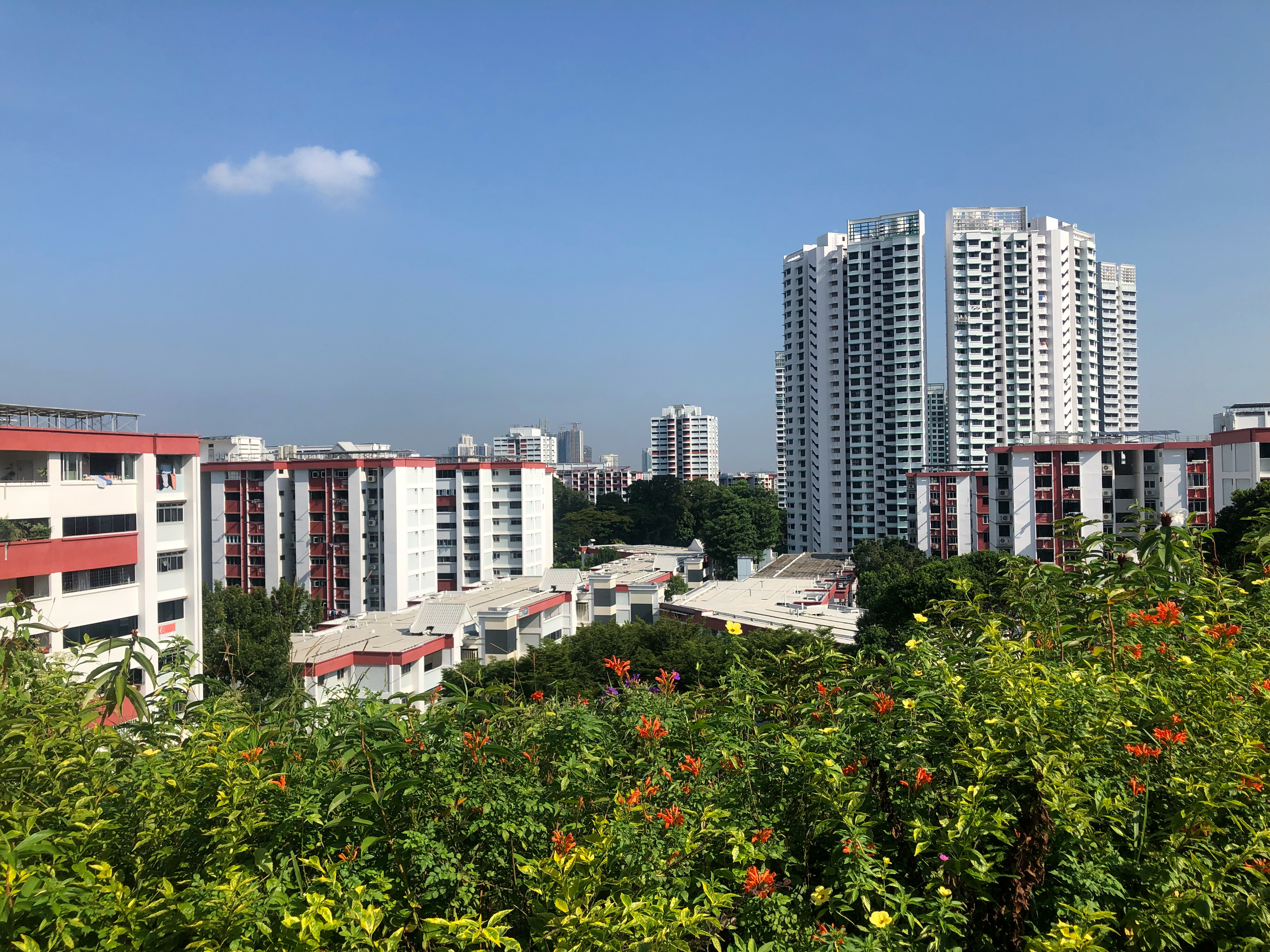
- Woodlands Town Park East, looking north towards Housing and Development Board (HDB) flats in Marsiling

- Location of Marsiling within Singapore
- Coordinates: 1°25′57.14″N 103°46′26.65″E
- Country: Singapore

Government
  - Ruling parties: People's Action Party

Marsiling is a suburb of Woodlands, Singapore, extends from the north of Woodlands Square to the Woodlands Checkpoint, bordering Malaysia. It presents the older living patterns of Singapore; it is a quieter and much denser estate, often offering a reasonable and larger alternative to other housing options, and houses a large number of elderly and heavy-duty industries.

== History ==
In the late 1990s, a plan was introduced by the Government of Singapore to upgrade existing Housing and Development Board (HDB) apartment blocks by providing refurbished elevators serving every storey of each block, an additional room at the rear of each flat, and other modernising features. This led to a surge in housing prices. The community of foreigners living in Marsiling has also been increasing.

== Etymology ==
"Marsiling" is derived from Maxi (马西) village, Lim's hometown in Chaozhou, Guangdong province, China.

== Politics ==
In 2015, Marsiling was represented via Marsiling–Yew Tee Group Representation Constituency (GRC) with Alex Yam, Ong Teng Koon, Halimah Yacob and Lawrence Wong as their Members of Parliament. Halimah was the MP for the Marsiling division of the GRC.

On 7 August 2017, Halimah resigned the parliament and a member of the PAP in order to contest in the presidential election in the same year. The next day, Zaqy Mohamad, incumbent MP for Chua Chu Kang GRC, was appointed as the grassroots advisor (Note: An individual appointed for "grassroots engagement and outreach" in a GRC division or single-member constituency (SMC) who, according to the People's Association (PA), has to be aligned with the "Government of the day"; in practice, they are a member of the PAP. They do not need to be the elected MP for the area.) for Halimah's Marsiling division. Halimah had been the sole minority MP for Marsiling–Yew Tee GRC prior to her resignation. (Note: Every team in a GRC is legally required to contain at least one minority (i.e. non-Chinese) candidate, either Malay or Indian/other (other being not Chinese, Malay or Indian). The mandatory minority category in a GRC is determined by the President. The number of GRCs requiring Malay candidates at a general election must be three-fifths of the total number of GRCs, or, if that is fractional, the next highest whole number.) When queried by Pritam Singh, Workers' Party (WP) MP for Aljunied GRC, on said status of Halimah, the government maintained that it was legal to forgo by-elections in GRCs.

During the 2020 general election, Zaqy became a PAP candidate for the GRC. The PAP team defeated the SDP team with 63.18% of the vote and was elected as the MPs. Zaqy was assigned to the Marsiling division.

During the 2025 general election, the unchanged PAP team was re-elected with 73.48% of the vote against the SDP, a swing in their favour of over 10% and the best PAP performance in the GRC since its creation. Zaqy remained assigned to the Marsiling division.
