= Thandiwe Banda =

First Lady of Zambia

4th First Lady of Zambia
- In role 2 November 2008 – 23 September 2011
- President: Rupiah Banda
- Preceded by: Maureen Mwanawasa
- Succeeded by: Christine Kaseba

Second Lady of Zambia
- In office 9 October 2006 – 2 November 2008
- Succeeded by: Ireen Kunda

Personal details
- Spouse: Rupiah Banda (died 2022)
- Children: 2

Thandiwe Banda (born 1971/1972) is a Zambian political science teacher who served as the First Lady of Zambia from June 2008 until September 2011. Banda, who was in her 30s when she took over the position in 2008, was the youngest First Lady in Zambia's history. She was the second wife of former President Rupiah Banda until his death in March 2022.

== Biography ==
Rupiah Banda's first wife, Hope Mwansa Makulu, died in 2000. He and his second wife, Thandiwe Banda, married during the 2000s, despite an age gap of nearly forty years. He was around 70 years at the time of their wedding, while she was in her 30s. Thandiwe and Rupiah Banda are the parents of twins, Temwani and Duniya, whose conception came as a surprise to both, according to an interview she gave with BBC Africa.

On 9 October 2006, Rupiah Banda was appointed as the Vice President of Zambia by President Levy Mwanawasa, making Thandiwe the Second Lady of Zambia. After Mwanawasa's death in August 2008, Banda was elected President in November 2008, making Thandiwe Banda the youngest First Lady in Zambia's history. During her tenure, Banda advocated for the creation of an official office for the First Lady with a government-funded budget to support her public duties and charities. She focused on women's issues, including healthcare and child care, during her tenure. Banda campaigned for stronger legislation to punish perpetrators of domestic and sexual violence. She was also a proponent of the work of non-governmental organizations (NGOs) operating in Zambia.

On December 20, 2011, the government-run Times of Zambia newspaper published an article alleging that the government had seized several of Thandiwe Banda's properties, including a hotel in Malawi, worth billions of kwacha. Banda called the allegations false and demanded an apology and a retraction, which the newspaper initially refused. In January 2012, she filed a lawsuit for libel against the Times of Zambia and its editor-in-chief. In October 2012, the newspaper issued an apology and retracted the article, but the suit against the newspaper continued. Thandiwe Banda won her defamation suit against the Times of Zambia in May 2014. The court awarded Banda thousands of kwacha in damages as compensation.

Banda was diagnosed with breast cancer in 2014 and traveled to neighboring South Africa for medical care. She returned to Zambia on January 10, 2015, following several months of medical treatment.
