= Muchinga =

Muchinga may refer to:

- Muchinga (constituency), a constituency of the National Assembly of Zambia
- Muchinga Province, a province of Zambia
