= Zaqy Mohamad =

Singaporean politician (born 1974)

The Honourable Zaqy Mohamad
- زاقي محمد
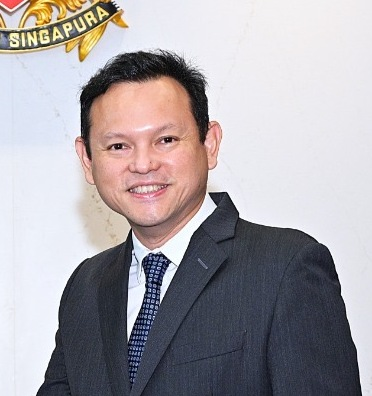
- Zaqy in 2026

Minister-in-charge of Muslim Affairs
- Acting
- Assumed office 20 July 2026
- Prime Minister: Lawrence Wong
- Preceded by: Muhammad Faishal Ibrahim (Acting)

Deputy Leader of the House
- Incumbent
- Assumed office 24 August 2020
- Prime Minister: Lee Hsien Loong; Lawrence Wong
- Preceded by: Desmond Lee

Deputy Party Whip of the People's Action Party
- In office 6 June 2019 – 23 August 2020 Serving with Sim Ann
- Secretary-General: Lee Hsien Loong
- Party Whip: Janil Puthucheary
- Leader: Indranee Rajah
- Preceded by: Sam Tan

Member of the Singapore Parliament for Marsiling–Yew Tee GRC
- Incumbent
- Assumed office 10 July 2020
- Preceded by: PAP held
- Majority: 2020: 29,123 (26.36%); 2025: 51,862 (46.96%)

Member of the Singapore Parliament for Chua Chu Kang GRC
- In office 21 May 2011 – 23 June 2020
- Preceded by: PAP held
- Succeeded by: PAP held
- Majority: 2011: 32,825 (22.40%); 2015: 59,271 (53.78%)

Member of the Singapore Parliament for Hong Kah GRC
- In office 6 May 2006 – 18 April 2011
- Preceded by: PAP held
- Succeeded by: PAP held
- Majority: N/A (walkover)

Personal details
- Born: Zaqy bin Mohamad; 15 September 1974 (age 52) Singapore
- Party: People's Action Party
- Spouse: Haryane Mustajab
- Children: 3
- Education: Nanyang Technological University (BEng, MS)
- Occupation: Politician

Zaqy bin Mohamad (Note: Jawi: زاقي بن محمد) (born 15 September 1974) is a Singaporean politician who has been serving as Deputy Leader of the House, Senior Minister of State for Sustainability and the Environment since 2025, Acting Minister-in-charge of Muslim Affairs since 2026 and Senior Minister of State for Defence since 2020. A member of the governing People's Action Party (PAP), he has been the Member of Parliament (MP) representing the Marsiling division of Marsiling–Yew Tee Group Representation Constituency since 2020.

Prior to entering politics, Zaqy had worked at Arthur Andersen, IBM Business Consulting Services, Avanade, Dimension Data and Ernst & Young.

He made his political debut in the 2006 general election as part of a five-member PAP team contesting in Hong Kah GRC and won by an uncontested walkover. He contested in Chua Chu Kang GRC in the 2011 and 2015 general elections and retained his parliamentary seat in both elections. He served as an advisor for Marsiling–Yew Tee GRC when Halimah Yacob resigned to contest for the presidential election. During the 2020 general election, he contested in Marsiling–Yew Tee GRC and won.

He had served as Minister of State for National Development and Minister of State for Manpower concurrently between 2018 and 2020.

== Education ==
Zaqy was educated at St. Michael's School, Raffles Institution and Raffles Junior College before graduating from the Nanyang Technological University with a Bachelor of Engineering degree in electrical and electronic engineering. He was President of NTU Students' Union and he championed student welfare and financial assistance programmes for needy students during his tenure.

He subsequently went on to complete a Master of Science degree in financial engineering at the Nanyang Technological University.

== Career ==
Zaqy was a senior consultant at Arthur Andersen from 1999 to 2002 before he became a business consultant at IBM Business Consulting Services from 2002 to 2005. He then became the Solutions Director at Avanade in 2005 before becoming Sales Head at Dimension Data in 2008. In 2014, he joined Ernst & Young as a partner with the ASEAN Business Development unit.

=== Political career ===
Zaqy entered politics in the 2006 general election as part of a five-member People's Action Party (PAP) team contesting in Hong Kah GRC. After the PAP team won by an uncontested walkover, Zaqy became a Member of Parliament representing the Keat Hong ward of Hong Kah GRC. During the 2011 general election, Hong Kah GRC was reconstituted as Chua Chu Kang GRC so Zaqy contested in this new GRC as part of a five-member PAP team. They won with 61.2% of the vote against the National Solidarity Party and Zaqy continued serving as the Member of Parliament representing the Keat Hong ward of Chua Chu Kang GRC.

During the 2015 general election, Zaqy joined the four-member PAP team contesting in Chua Chu Kang GRC and they won with 76.89% of the vote against the People's Power Party. Zaqy was co-opted into the PAP's Central Executive Committee on 5 January 2015, but had to leave due to regulatory compliance reasons as he was also working at Ernst & Young, which was the auditor for the PAP.

On 8 August 2017, after Halimah Yacob resigned from her position as a Member of Parliament representing the Marsiling ward in Marsiling–Yew Tee GRC to participate in the 2017 presidential election, Zaqy was appointed as a grassroots adviser, under the government-linked People's Association, for the Marsiling ward.

On 1 May 2018, Zaqy was appointed Minister of State at the Ministry of National Development and Ministry of Manpower. He also served as Deputy Government Whip from 6 June 2019 to 18 August 2020.

In the 2020 general election, Zaqy joined the four-member PAP team contesting in Marsiling–Yew Tee GRC and they won with 63.18% of the vote against the Singapore Democratic Party (SDP), after which Zaqy became the MP representing the Marsiling ward. On 27 July 2020, Zaqy was promoted to Senior Minister of State at the Ministry of Manpower and Ministry of Defence. He also became Deputy Leader of the House in Parliament on 20 August 2020.

During the 2025 general election, Zaqy and his four-member PAP team defended their seats against another SDP team in Marsiling–Yew Tee GRC. He was re-elected with the team when the team won 73.46 percent of the votes.

On 19 July, Zaqy was appointed as Acting Minister-in-Charge of Muslim Affairs, after the resignation of Associate Professor Faishal Ibrahim. On 22 July, Prime Minister Lawrence Wong announced that Zaqy would remain Senior Minister of State in the Ministry of Defence, and would relinquish his appointment in the Ministry of Sustainability and the Environment.

== Personal life ==
Zaqy is married to Haryane Mustajab. He and his wife have three children in total.

== See also ==
- List of Singapore MPs
- List of current Singapore MPs

== Notes ==
Political offices
Preceded by Sam Tan Chin Siong	Minister of State for Manpower; 2018–2020	Succeeded by Gan Siow Huang
Preceded by Koh Poh Koon	Minister of State for National Development; 2018–2020	Succeeded by Muhammad Faishal Ibrahim; Tan Kiat How
Preceded by Maliki Osman	Senior Minister of State for Defence; 2020–present Served alongside: Heng Chee How	Incumbent
Vacant	Senior Minister of State for Manpower; 2020–2025	Vacant
Preceded by Amy Khor	Senior Minister of State for Sustainability and the Environment; 2025–present Served alongside: Janil Puthucheary	Incumbent
Preceded by Muhammad Faishal Ibrahim	Minister-in-charge of Muslim Affairs; Acting; 2026–	Incumbent
Parliament of Singapore
Preceded by Yeo Cheow Tong; Amy Khor; Ang Mong Seng; Ahmad Khalis; John Chen	Member of Parliament for Hong Kah GRC; 2006–2011; Served alongside: Yeo Cheow Tong, Amy Khor, Ang Mong Seng, Alvin Yeo	Constituency abolished
New constituency	Member of Parliament for Chua Chu Kang GRC; 2011–2020; Served alongside: (2011-2015): Gan Kim Yong, Low Yen Ling, Alvin Yeo, Alex Yam (2015-2020): Gan Kim Yong, Low Yen Ling, Yee Chia Hsing	Succeeded by Don Wee; Gan Kim Yong; Low Yen Ling; Zhulkarnain Abdul Rahim
Preceded by Alex Yam; Ong Teng Koon; Halimah Yacob; Lawrence Wong	Member of Parliament for Marsiling–Yew Tee GRC; 2020–present Served alongside: (2020-2025): Alex Yam, Hany Soh, Lawrence Wong (2025-present): Alex Yam, Hany Soh, Lawrence Wong	Incumbent
