= Hany Soh =

Singaporean politician and lawyer

The Honourable Hany Soh
- 苏慧敏
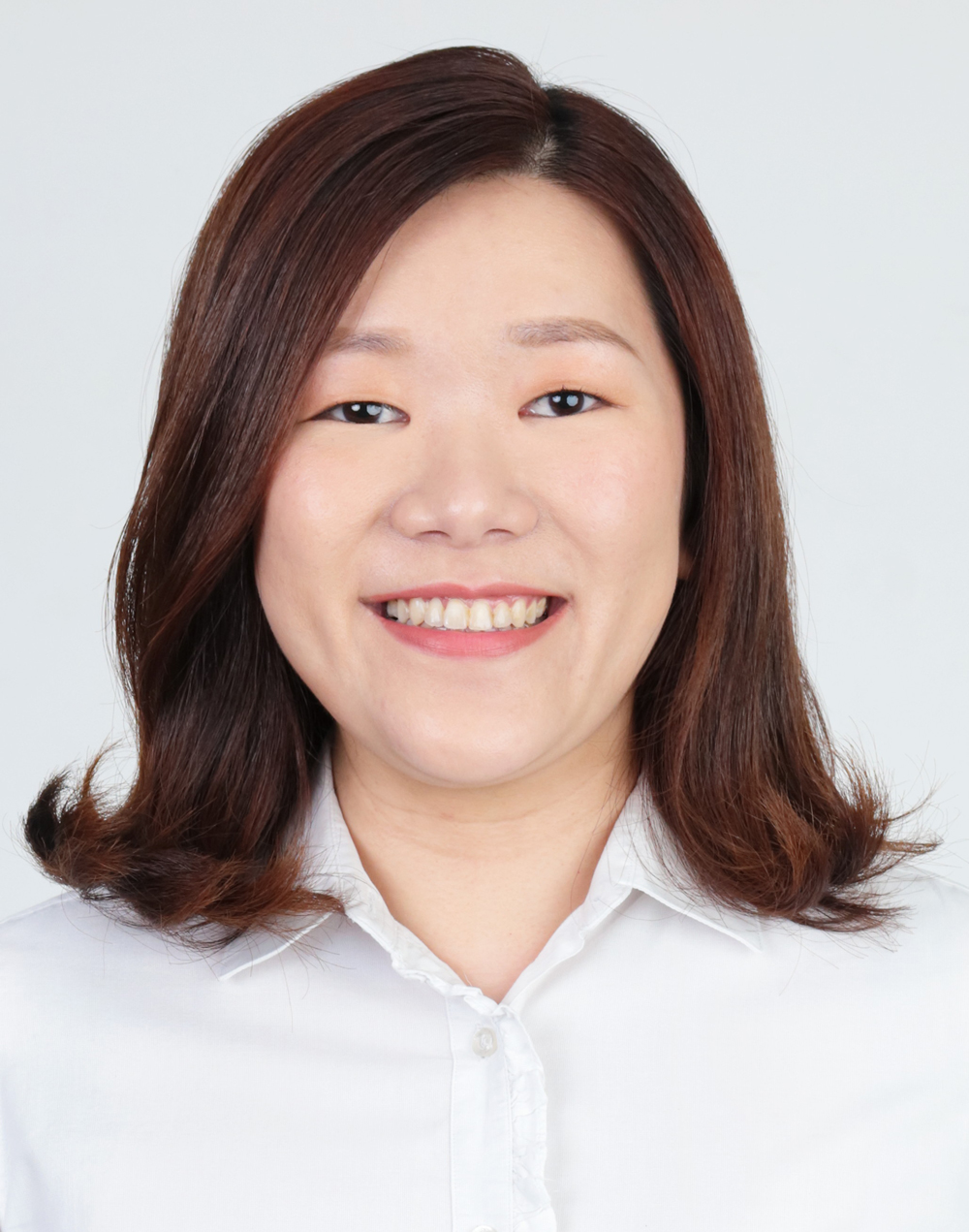
- Official portrait, 2021

Member of Parliament for Marsiling–Yew Tee GRC
- Incumbent
- Assumed office 10 July 2020
- Preceded by: PAP held
- Majority: 2020: 29,123 (26.36%); 2025: 51,862 (46.96%)

Personal details
- Born: Hany Soh Hui Bin; 24 June 1987 (age 39) Singapore
- Party: People's Action Party
- Children: 2
- Education: University of Liverpool (LLB)
- Occupation: Politician; lawyer

Hany Soh Hui Bin (Note: Chinese: 苏慧敏; Pe̍h-ōe-jī: So͘ Hūi-bín; In this Chinese name, the family name is Soh. In accordance with custom, the Western-style name is Hany Soh and the Chinese-style name is Soh Hui Bin) (born 24 June 1987) is a Singaporean politician and lawyer. A member of the governing People's Action Party (PAP), she has been the Member of Parliament (MP) representing the Woodgrove division of Marsiling–Yew Tee Group Representation Constituency since 2020.

== Education ==
Soh attended Bendemeer Secondary School under the Normal (Academic) stream before graduating from Temasek Polytechnic after her O-Level with a diploma in law and management.

She subsequently went on to complete a Bachelor of Laws degree at the University of Liverpool in 2011.

== Career ==
=== Legal career ===
Soh joined MSC Law Corporation in 2016 and became its director in 2017.

=== Political career ===
Following her graduation in 2011, Soh had been a volunteer, along with other grassroots members of Bukit Panjang with the support of Teo Ho Pin, Mayor of North West District.

In 2013, she was called to the Singapore Bar as an Advocate and Solicitor of the Supreme Court. In 2014, she established the first Community Legal Clinic in a Residents' Committee centre.

Soh joined the governing People's Action Party (PAP) and served as a member of the PAP HQ Executive Committee between 2017 and 2018.

During the 2020 general election, Soh was fielded as part of a four-member PAP team contesting in Marsiling–Yew Tee GRC. On 5 July, during her election campaign, she fell and fractured her foot. She and the PAP team in Marsiling–Yew Tee GRC were eventually elected into Parliament after defeating the opposition Singapore Democratic Party with 63.18% of the vote.

Soh was appointed as Vice-Chairperson for Marsiling-Yew Tee Town Council (MYTTC) since 2020. Soh is part of the Government Parliamentary Committee under Education where she serves as deputy chairman since 2025.

== Notes ==
Preceded by Alex Yam; Ong Teng Koon; Halimah Yacob; Lawrence Wong	Member of Parliament for Marsiling–Yew Tee GRC; 2020–present Served alongside: (2020-2025): Alex Yam, Zaqy Mohamad, Lawrence Wong (2025-present): Alex Yam, Zaqy Mohamad, Lawrence Wong	Incumbent
