= George Kunda =

Zambian lawyer and politician

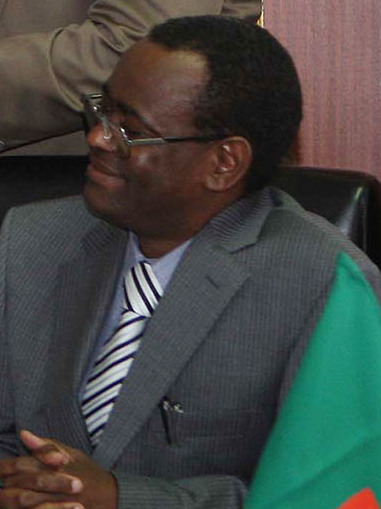

11th Vice-President of Zambia
- In office 2 November 2008 – 23 September 2011
- President: Rupiah Banda
- Preceded by: Rupiah Banda
- Succeeded by: Guy Scott

Member of the National Assembly for Muchinga
- In office 1 October 2006 – 16 April 2012
- Preceded by: Ackson Kalunga
- Succeeded by: Howard Kunda

Personal details
- Born: February 26, 1956 Luanshya, Federation of Rhodesia and Nyasaland
- Died: April 16, 2012 (aged 56) Lusaka, Zambia
- Party: Movement for Multi-Party Democracy
- Spouse: Irene Kunda
- Children: Howard, Georgina, Marion, George, Godfrey, Chiluba
- Education: University of Zambia
- Profession: Attorney

George Kunda (26 February 1956 – 16 April 2012) was a Zambian lawyer and politician who was the 11th vice-president of Zambia from 2008 to 2011. He served as the vice-president under President Rupiah Banda until the 2011 election.

== Early life and career ==
The son of a miner, Kunda studied at Serenje Boys Technical School and obtained a law degree from the University of Zambia and began practicing on April 28, 1982. He started his career at the Luanshya Municipal Council as a solicitor before creating his own law firm in 1990.

== Politics ==
While Kunda did not compete in the 2001 parliamentary election, he gained one of the eight appointed seats in Parliament. President Levy Mwanawasa appointed him to the positions of Minister of Justice and Attorney General in 2002. However, Mwanawasa removed Kunda from the position of Attorney General and appointed Mumba Malila in 2006 while leaving Kunda with his position of Justice Minister.

At the 2006 general election, Kunda stood as the Movement for Multi-Party Democracy (MMD) candidate in Muchinga constituency of Serenje District and won the seat.

After the death of President Levy Mwanawasa, Rupiah Banda was elected as the President of Zambia in November 2008 and Kunda was chosen to be his vice-president up to the next election in September 2011. At a mining conference in June 2011, Kunda stated that Zambia was interested in expanding their mining resources, such as iron ore and uranium.

Kunda stood again as the MMD candidate in Muchinga constituency at the 2011 general election and was re-elected. After his death on 16 April 2012, his son, Howard Kunda, succeeded him as the MMD candidate at the subsequent Muchinga constituency by-election and was elected.

== Homosexuality ==
In May 2010, Kunda claimed that homosexuality could lead to "sadism and Satanism". Kunda brought up the topic of homosexuality in the months leading to the 2011 elections as a "wedge issue" by addressing the Parliament of Zambia on 18 March 2011 and highlighted that homosexuality in Zambia is illegal and punishable in the Zambian law.

== Death ==
On 16 April 2012, Kunda died of a kidney failure. He was buried at Leopards Hill Memorial Park in Lusaka on 20 April 2012.

Political offices
Preceded by Rupiah Banda	Vice-President of Zambia; 2008–2011	Succeeded by Guy Scott
