= Nevers Mumba =

Zambian politician

Nevers Sekwila Mumba
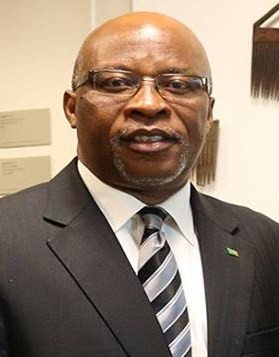

8th Vice-President of Zambia
- In office 29 May 2003 – 4 October 2004
- President: Levy Mwanawasa
- Preceded by: Enoch Kavindele
- Succeeded by: Lupando Mwape

Personal details
- Born: 18 May 1960 (age 66) Serenje Mission (now Chitambo District), Zambia
- Party: Movement for Multi-Party Democracy (prior to 2026)

Nevers Sekwila Mumba (born 18 May 1960 in Chitambo at Chitambo Mission, Zambia) is a Zambian religious minister and former politician. He is was the leader of the Movement for Multi-Party Democracy from 2012 to 2026. He served as the eighth vice-president of Zambia in 2003–04 under Levy Mwanawasa.

== Early life and career ==
Mumba grew up with his parents and 11 brothers and sisters in Chinsali, in a religious home. His father Sunday Mumba was a teacher and pastor at the United Church of Zambia. He was baptised as a member of the United Church in Zambia by Rev. Paul Mushindo.

Mumba had his primary education at Chinsali Basic School. After getting very good grades at his Grade 7 examination, he was selected to go to Hillcrest Technical High School in Livingstone. Whilst there, he joined the Zambia Combined Cadet Force (ZCCF) and rose to the rank of Provincial Commandant for Southern Province.

He then went to the Zambia National Service for one-year compulsory training. Here he had hoped to become a full military man, but he changed his mind, left, and went to work in the mines on the Copperbelt Province.

There, he decided to join the Pentecostal Movement and joined the Maranathan Church where he became a church elder under Bishop Sky Banda at age 19. The following year, in 1980, he left and founded Victory Bible Church and Victory Ministries International.

In 1997, he founded the National Christian Coalition, a Christian political movement. It was registered as a political party in 1998. It participated in the 2001 general election, where Mumba emerged as 5th out of over 11 candidates.

He was Zambia's High Commissioner to Canada from 2009 until 2011.

On 25 May 2012, Mumba was elected as President of the Movement for Multiparty Democracy (MMD) political party, which had been in opposition since its defeat in the 2011 presidential election. He defeated rival Felix Mutati along with several other candidates. He was the party's presidential candidate at the 2015 Zambian presidential election, where he finished fourth in a field of eleven candidates with 0.87% of the vote.

In May 2016, a group of MMD members elected former Lunte member of parliament Felix Mutati as party president at a convention at the Mulungushi Rock of Authority in Kabwe, while other members continued supporting Mumba. Mumba took this matter of who is the legitimate party president to court, which prevented the party from participating in the 2016 general election.

On 9 November 2019, High Court Judge Sharon Newa sitting in Lusaka ruled that the convention that elected Felix Mutati as Party President was illegal and all decisions made between then and that date were declared null and void, confirming that Mumba was the president of the party. Nevers Mumba was the MMD presidential candidate at the 2021 general election, where he finished tenth in a field of sixteen candidates with 0.1% of the vote.

On 30 October 2024, Mumba announced that the MMD had decided to join the UPND Alliance, a coalition of political parties, effectively deciding that it will not field its own presidential candidate at the 2026 general election and will endorse the United Party for National Development president, Hakainde Hichilema, at that election.

On 6 November 2025, party president Nevers Mumba announced that the Movement for Multi-Party Democracy (MMD) has changed its name to the New Nation Party (NNP) as part of a rebranding process.

In mid-September 2026, party president Nevers Mumba retired from active politics with immediate effect, thereby stepping down as the president of the New Nation Party.

Political offices
Preceded by Enoch Kavindele	Vice-President of Zambia; 2003–2004	Succeeded by Lupando Mwape
