= Alex Yam =

Singaporean politician

The Honourable Alex Yam
- 任梓銘
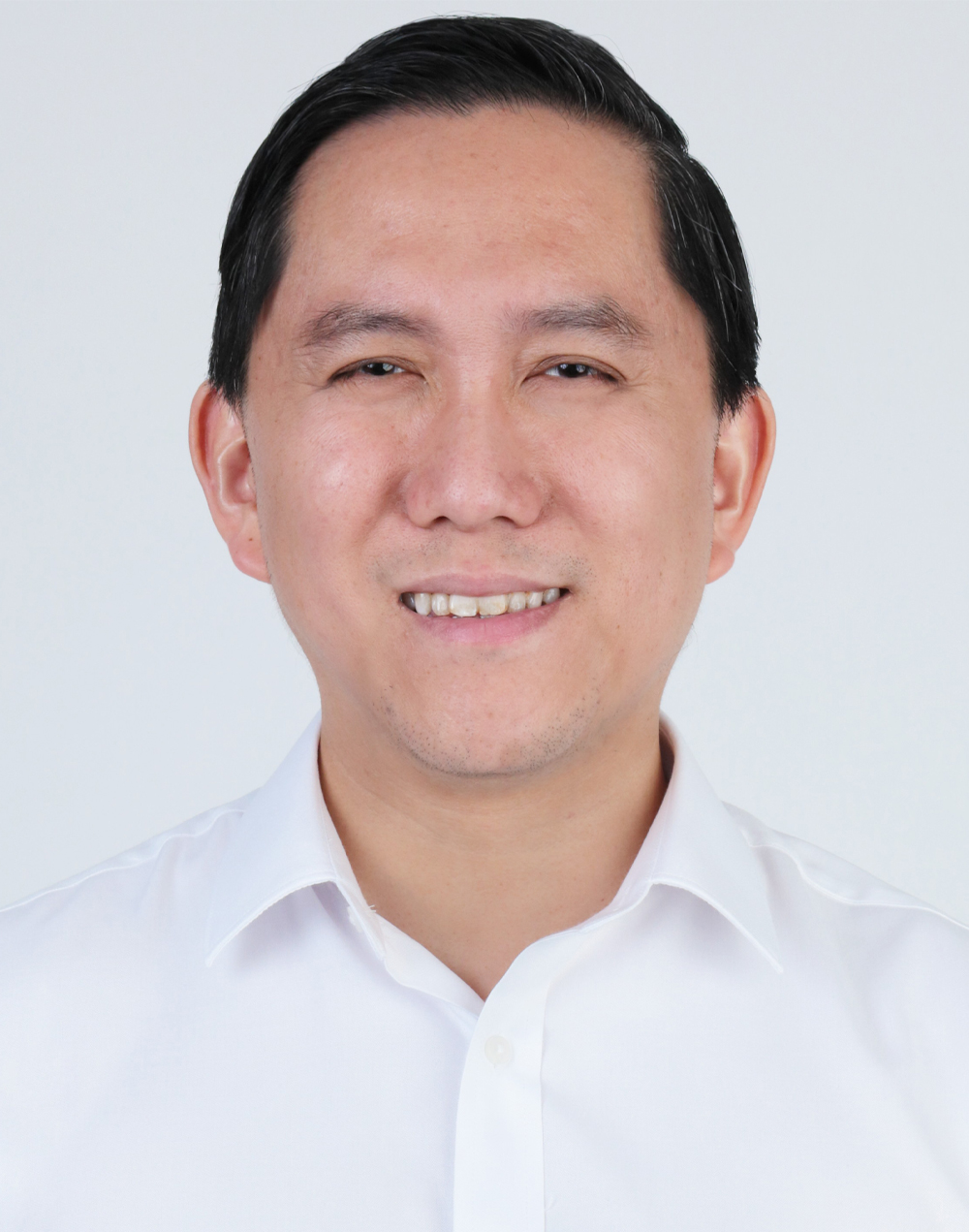
- Official portrait, 2021

Mayor of North West District
- Incumbent
- Assumed office 27 July 2020
- Preceded by: Teo Ho Pin

Assistant Organising Secretaries of the People's Action Party
- Incumbent
- Assumed office 23 November 2018 Serving with Desmond Tan & Dinesh Vasu Dash
- Prime Minister: Lawrence Wong

Member of the Singapore Parliament for Marsiling–Yew Tee GRC
- Incumbent
- Assumed office 11 September 2015
- Preceded by: Constituency established
- Majority: 2015: 37,328 (37.46%); 2020: 29,123 (26.36%); 2025: 51,862 (46.96%)

Member of the Singapore Parliament for Chua Chu Kang GRC
- In office 7 May 2011 – 25 August 2015
- Preceded by: PAP hold
- Succeeded by: PAP hold
- Majority: 32,825 (22.40%)

Personal details
- Born: Alex Ren Ziming (任志明); 20 June 1981 (age 45) Singapore
- Party: People's Action Party
- Spouse: Jocelyn Alexandra Wong
- Children: 4
- Education: University of Kent
- Occupation: Politician
- Profession: Public servant

Alex Yam Ziming (Chinese: 任梓銘; pinyin: Rén Zǐmíng; born 20 June 1981) is a Singaporean politician who has served as Mayor of the North West District since 2020. A member of the governing People's Action Party (PAP), he has been the Member of Parliament (MP) representing the Yew Tee division of Marsiling–Yew Tee Group Representation Constituency since 2015, and previously represented it under Chua Chu Kang Group Representation Constituency from 2011 to 2015.

== Early life and education ==
Yam was born at Mount Alvernia Hospital in Singapore in 1981 to Yam Kah Heng and Lucy Yeo. He was educated at Maris Stella High School, Dunman High School, and Victoria Junior College.

He obtained a bachelor degree in politics and international relations from the University of Kent, with a focus on North Asian politics and communitarian thought. During his university years, Yam was elected to the student union council representing ethnic minorities and international students, and also served as co-president of the university chaplaincy.

== Early career ==
Yam received the National Volunteers Award from the Life Insurance Association of Singapore in 2000. He worked at the National University of Singapore from 2005 to 2006 before joining the National Trades Union Congress (NTUC), where he served as Head of Strategies & Planning and Head of Youth Lab. He also acted as a consultant for the Singapore Industrial & Services Employees’ Union.

Between 2006 and 2009, he was secretary to then-Minister for the Environment Lim Swee Say in the Buona Vista Citizens' Consultative Committee. He succeeded Liang Eng Hwa as Chairman of the Youth Wing. From 2009 to 2011, he served in the Yew Tee Citizens' Consultative Committee and Community Club Management Committee.

== Political career ==
Yam entered politics in the 2011 general election, contesting in Chua Chu Kang GRC as part of a PAP team led by Gan Kim Yong. He was elected and subsequently appointed Deputy Executive Director of the PAP in 2012, and Executive Director in 2013.

In the 12th Parliament, he chaired the Defence and Foreign Affairs Government Parliamentary Committee (GPC), and also sat on the Culture, Community & Youth, and Social & Family Development GPCs.

Yam co-sponsored a Private Member’s Bill with Yeo Guat Kwang in 2014 to amend the Animals and Birds Act, strengthening animal welfare laws.

In the 2015 general election, Yam was elected in the newly formed Marsiling–Yew Tee GRC, joining a team led by Halimah Yacob and Lawrence Wong. He has served as Chairman of the Marsiling–Yew Tee Town Council since 2015. He was elected to chair the new National Development GPC in the 13th Parliament and served on the Estimates Committee and the Culture, Community and Youth GPC.

In 2018, he was appointed Assistant Organising Secretary of the PAP, and has been a member of its Central Executive Committee since 2020.

Yam was re-elected in the 2020 general election. In the naming his new Cabinet, then-Prime Minister Lee Hsien Loong appointed Yam as the mayor of the North West District on 27 July 2020. He also became one of 5 District Chairmen in the PAP HQ Executive Committee.

In the 2025 general election, the PAP team in Marsiling–Yew Tee GRC won with 73.46% of the vote. After the election, Yam was elected Chairman of the Culture, Community and Youth GPC for the 15th Parliament.

== Public service ==
Yam was a board member of the Chinese Development Assistance Council (CDAC) from 2009 to 2024. He chaired its Outreach Committee from 2015 and later led the Fulfilling Ageing Committee.

He served on the National Committee for Youth Guidance & Rehabilitation and later the National Committee on Prevention, Rehabilitation and Recidivism. He co-chaired the Sports & Arts (SPAR) subcommittee under the National Youth Council.

Yam is also a long-serving member of the PAP Community Foundation's Council of Management and executive committee. He serves on the National Steering Committee on Racial and Religious Harmony and advises the People’s Association Integration Council.

== Personal life ==
Yam is a Roman Catholic convert. He is married to Jocelyn Alexandra Wong and they have three sons and one daughter. He and his wife lead a church support group for families experiencing miscarriage, stillbirth, or abortion. He was a founding pro-tem committee member of the CANA Catholic Centre and has been Director of The Catholic News (Singapore) since 2025.

Yam is a Knight of Magistral Grace of the Sovereign Military Order of Malta. He is also the author of Following Christ in the Public Square: Reflections on the Imitation of Christ for those in Public Life.

== Other activities ==
- Member, International Catholic Legislators Network (ICLN)
- Co-president, Asia-Pacific Catholic Legislators Network (APCLN)

== Honours ==
- Holy See Knight of Magistral Grace, Sovereign Military Order of Malta

== See also ==
- List of Singapore MPs
- List of current Singapore MPs

Political offices
Preceded by Teo Ho Pin	Mayor of North West District; 2020–present	Incumbent
Preceded by Sitoh Yih Pin	Chairman of Government Parliamentary Committee for Culture, Community and Youth; 2025–present	Incumbent
New title	Chairman of Government Parliamentary Committee for National Development; 2015–2020	Succeeded by Cheryl Chan
Parliament of Singapore
New constituency	Member of Parliament for Chua Chu Kang GRC; 2011–2015; Served alongside: Gan Kim Yong, Low Yen Ling, Zaqy Mohamad, Alvin Yeo	Succeeded by Gan Kim Yong; Low Yen Ling; Zaqy Mohamad; Yee Chia Hsing
New constituency	Member of Parliament for Marsiling–Yew Tee GRC; 2015–present Served alongside: 2015–2020: Ong Teng Koon, Halimah Yacob, Lawrence Wong; 2020–2025: Zaqy Mohamad, Hany Soh, Lawrence Wong; 2025–present: Zaqy Mohamad, Hany Soh, Lawrence Wong	Incumbent
