= Rupiah Banda =

Zambian politician (1937–2022)

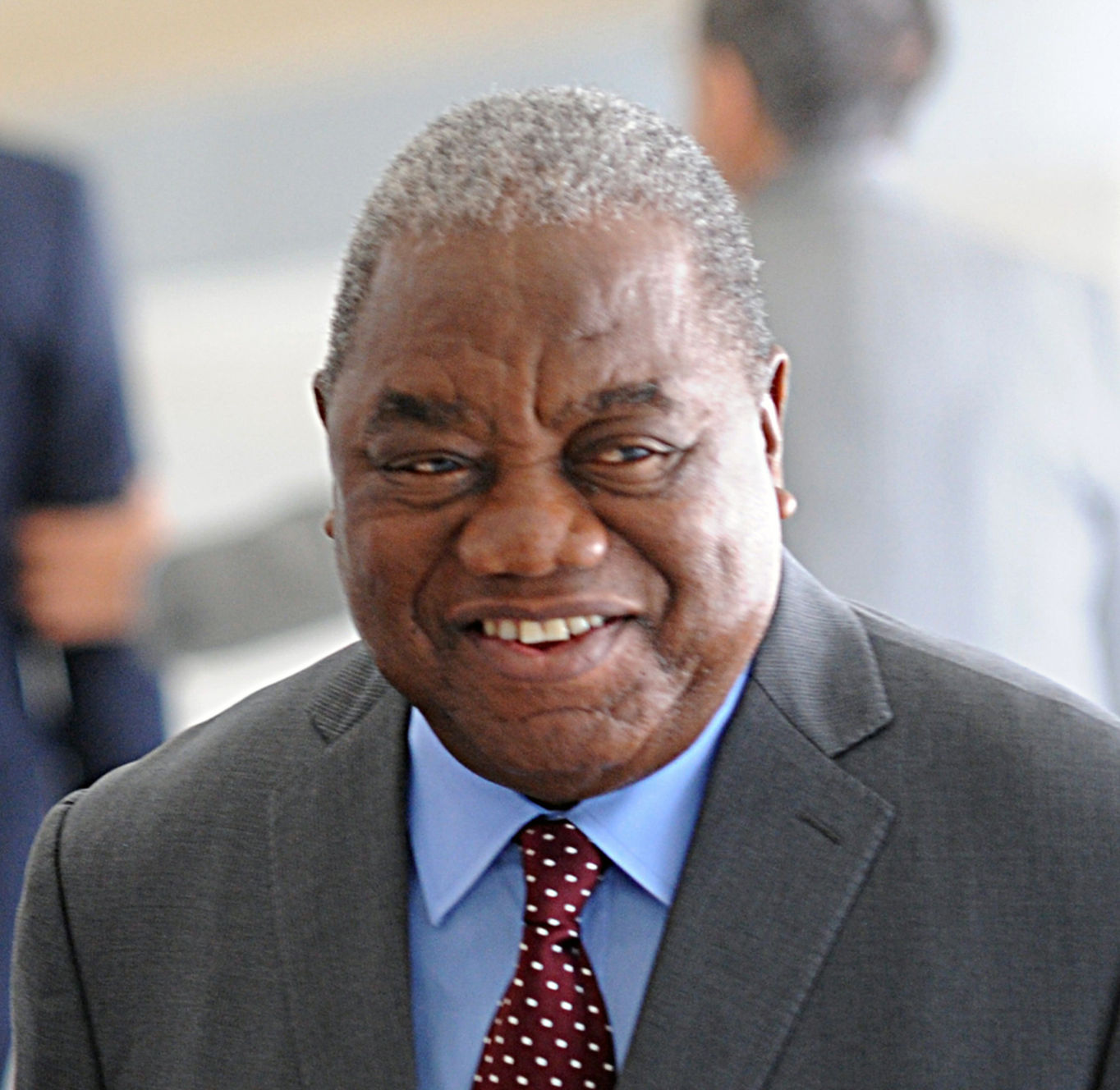
- Banda in 2010

4th President of Zambia
- In office 19 August 2008 – 23 September 2011
- Vice President: George Kunda
- Preceded by: Levy Mwanawasa
- Succeeded by: Michael Sata

10th Vice-President of Zambia
- In office 9 October 2006 – 2 November 2008
- President: Levy Mwanawasa
- Preceded by: Lupando Mwape
- Succeeded by: George Kunda

Personal details
- Born: Rupiah Bwezani Banda; 19 February 1937 Gwanda, Southern Rhodesia
- Died: 11 March 2022 (aged 85) Lusaka, Zambia
- Cause of death: Colorectal cancer
- Resting place: Embassy Park; 15.421884°S 28.309314°E
- Party: United National Independence Party (1978 – 1996); Movement for Multi-Party Democracy (1996 – 2012)
- Spouses: Hope Mwansa Makulu (m. 1966; died 2000); Thandiwe Banda
- Children: 7
- Education: Addis Ababa University; Lund University; Wolfson College, Cambridge
- Nickname: RB

Rupiah Bwezani Banda (19 February 1937 – 11 March 2022) was a Zambian politician who served as the fourth president of Zambia from 2008 to 2011, taking over from Levy Mwanawasa. Banda was an active participant in politics from early in the presidency of Kenneth Kaunda, during which time he held several diplomatic posts.

In October 2006, he was appointed the vice-president by Mwanawasa. After Mwanawasa suffered a stroke in June 2008 and died later that year, he became acting president. During the 2008 elections, he narrowly won against opposition leader Michael Sata of the Patriotic Front. He was later defeated in the 2011 election and succeeded by Sata.

== Early life ==
Banda was born in the town of Miko, Gwanda, Southern Rhodesia (now Zimbabwe); his parents had come from Northern Rhodesia to find employment prior to his birth, and he was sponsored by a local Dutch Reformed Church preacher (and later, the family of B. R. Naik, a family of Indian origin) to continue his education into adulthood. He became involved in politics when he joined the youth wing of the United National Independence Party (UNIP) in 1960. Banda was one of the notable alumni of Rusangu University, Zambia.

== Diplomacy ==
Rupiah Banda was the UNIP's representative in Northern Europe in the early 1960s and in 1965 he was appointed Zambia's Ambassador to Egypt (the United Arab Republic). While there, he became friends with UNITA leader Jonas Savimbi, and the decision to allow UNITA to open offices in Lusaka at that time has been attributed to Banda's influence. Banda became Ambassador to the United States on 7 April 1967.

He served as Ambassador to the U.S. for about two years, then returned to Zambia to serve as Chief Executive of the Rural Development Corporation for about two years and subsequently as General Manager of the National Agriculture Marketing Board for a similar length of time.

He was then appointed Permanent Representative to the United Nations, and while in this position he also headed the U.N. Council for Namibia. After about a year at the U.N., he was appointed to the Zambian Cabinet as Minister of Foreign Affairs. During his brief stint as Foreign Minister (1975–1976), Banda was occupied by the task of attempting to broker a cease-fire in Angola.

== Politics ==
Banda was elected as a Member of Parliament for the Munali Constituency in 1978 and lost the seat to Simeon Kampata in 1983. Although he was defeated in the 1988 election, he took the issue to court. He also served for a time as Minister of State for Mines.

In 1991, he was defeated in the Munali Constituency by the Movement for Multiparty Democracy (MMD) candidate Ronald Penza. Although he initially intended to run again for the seat in the 1996 election, he supported the United National Independence Party's boycott of the election.

After President Mwanawasa was re-elected in September 2006, he appointed Banda vice-president on 9 October 2006, along with a new cabinet. Following his appointment he subsequently joined the MMD. Banda's appointment was widely viewed as a means of rewarding eastern Zambians for supporting the MMD in the election, as this was the first time that easterners had done so.

Prior to a planned summit of the Southern African Development Community (SADC) in August 2007, Banda was sent by Mwanawasa to improve relations with neighboring Zimbabwe following Mwanawasa's criticism of Zimbabwean President Robert Mugabe.

== Presidency ==
=== Acting capacity ===
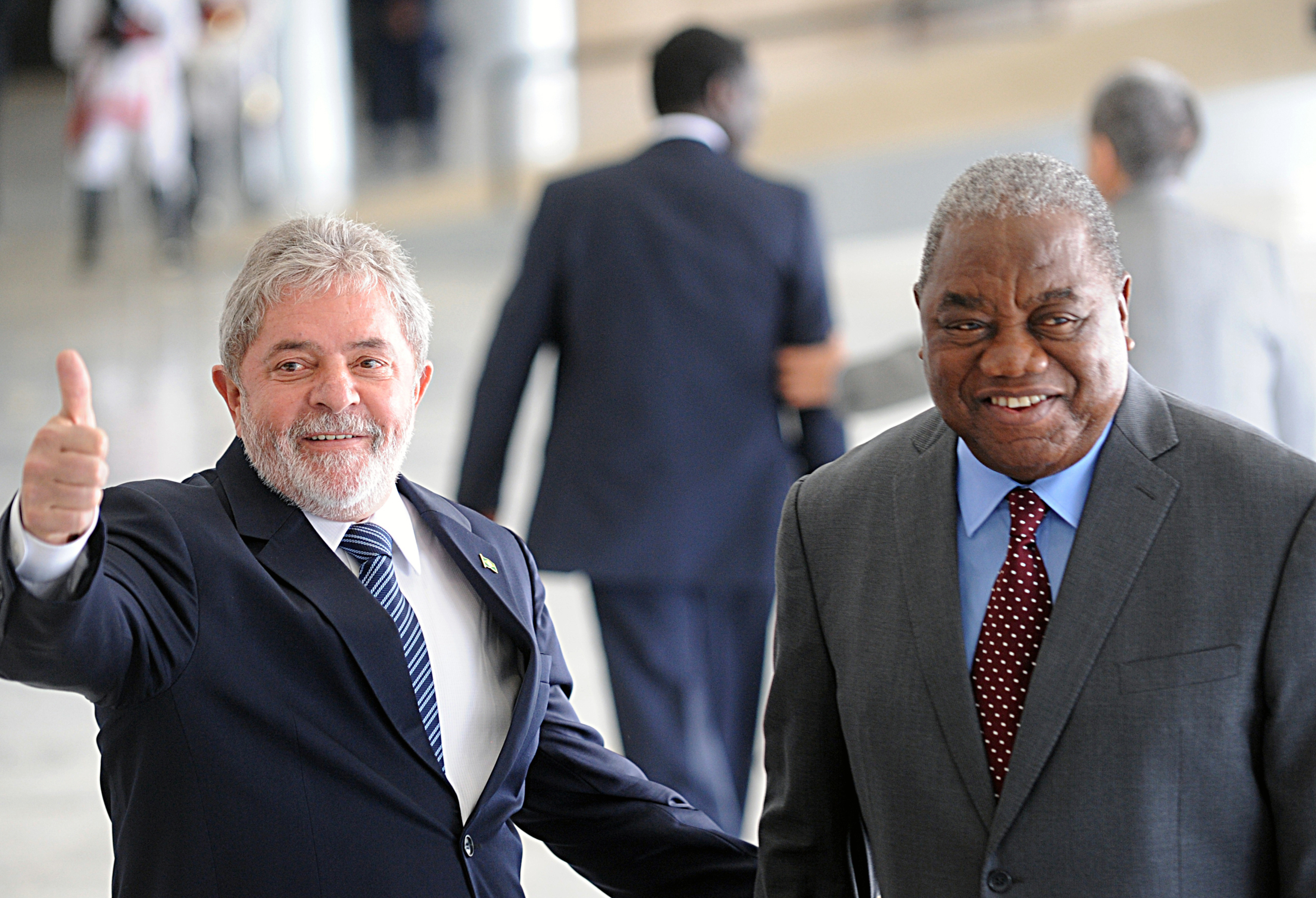
Banda with President of Brazil Luiz Inácio Lula da Silva in 2010

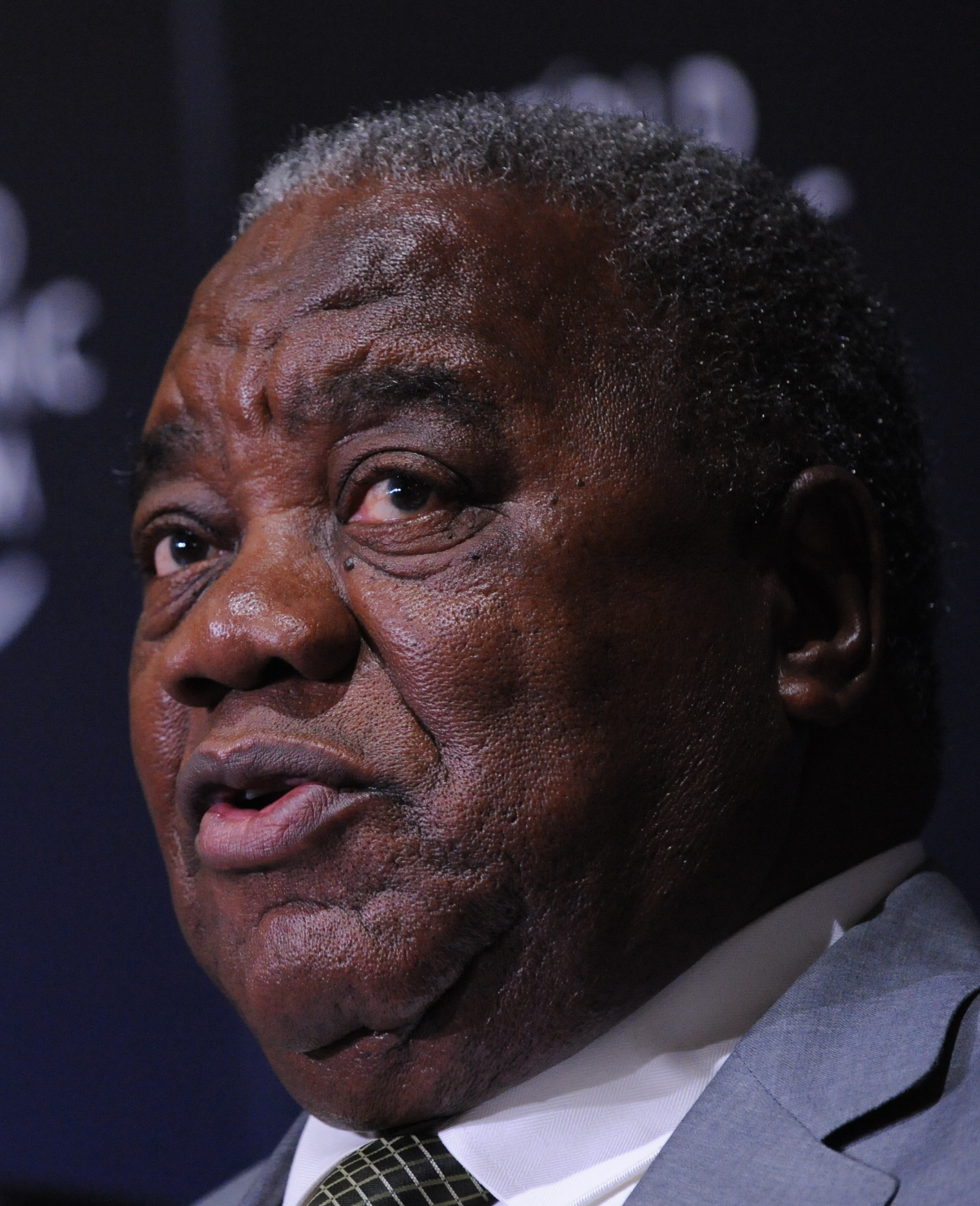
Banda at the 2010 World Economic Forum

After Mwanawasa suffered a stroke while attending an African Union summit in Egypt on 29 June 2008, Banda became acting president. He subsequently delivered a series of optimistic but vague updates on Mwanawasa's health. These updates were greeted with widespread skepticism, but Banda insisted that he had "no reason to lie".

As Vice-President, Banda also acted as the leader of government business in the National Assembly; however, when the National Assembly met on 5 August 2008, following Mwanawasa's stroke, Banda appointed the Minister of Defense, George Mpombo to lead the government's parliamentary business instead.

Mwanawasa never recovered from his stroke and died while still hospitalized in Paris on 19 August 2008. Expressing "immense grief and deep sorrow", Banda announced his death to the nation and declared a seven-day period of national mourning, urging Zambians to "remain calm and mourn our President with dignity". Banda officially took over as acting president prior to a new presidential election, which according to the constitution should be called within 90 days of Mwanawasa's death.

Banda filed an application to stand as the candidate of the MMD on 26 August 2008. On the same day, the MMD in Eastern Province released a statement in support of Banda's candidacy. He had been widely expected to win, and he received 47 votes against 11 for Ng'andu Magande, the Minister of Finance. On this occasion, Banda promised to "unite the party and the entire nation" and to "continue implementing [Mwanawasa's] programs".

Initial results showed Banda's main challenger, Michael Sata of the Patriotic Front (PF), in the lead, but as votes from rural areas were counted, Banda steadily closed the gap and ultimately overtook Sata. Final results on 2 November showed Banda with 40% of the vote against 38% for Sata. Banda was sworn in at State House on the same day, using his speech on the occasion to call for unity; the PF alleged fraud and refused to recognize Banda's victory, while Sata's supporters rioted in Lusaka and Kitwe.

=== Re-election and defeat ===
As President, Rupiah Banda was focused on economic development, traveling abroad to promote Zambian trade to other world leaders. In December 2010 he traveled to Egypt to meet with President Hosni Mubarak.

In mid-2009 it was announced that the MMD National Executive Committee had chosen Banda as the party's candidate for the 2011 presidential election. Some criticized this, arguing that the nomination process should be open to other candidates; Mpombo, the Defense Minister, resigned from his post in July 2009 while criticizing the process as undemocratic. President Banda subsequently welcomed others to challenge him for the nomination at the MMD Conventions taking place across the country.

After taking office, Banda dismantled much of the anti-corruption effort put into place by his predecessor, Mwanawasa.

Michael Sata, leader of the opposition Patriotic Front, defeated Banda in the September 2011 presidential election, ending his three-year presidency.

== Later life ==
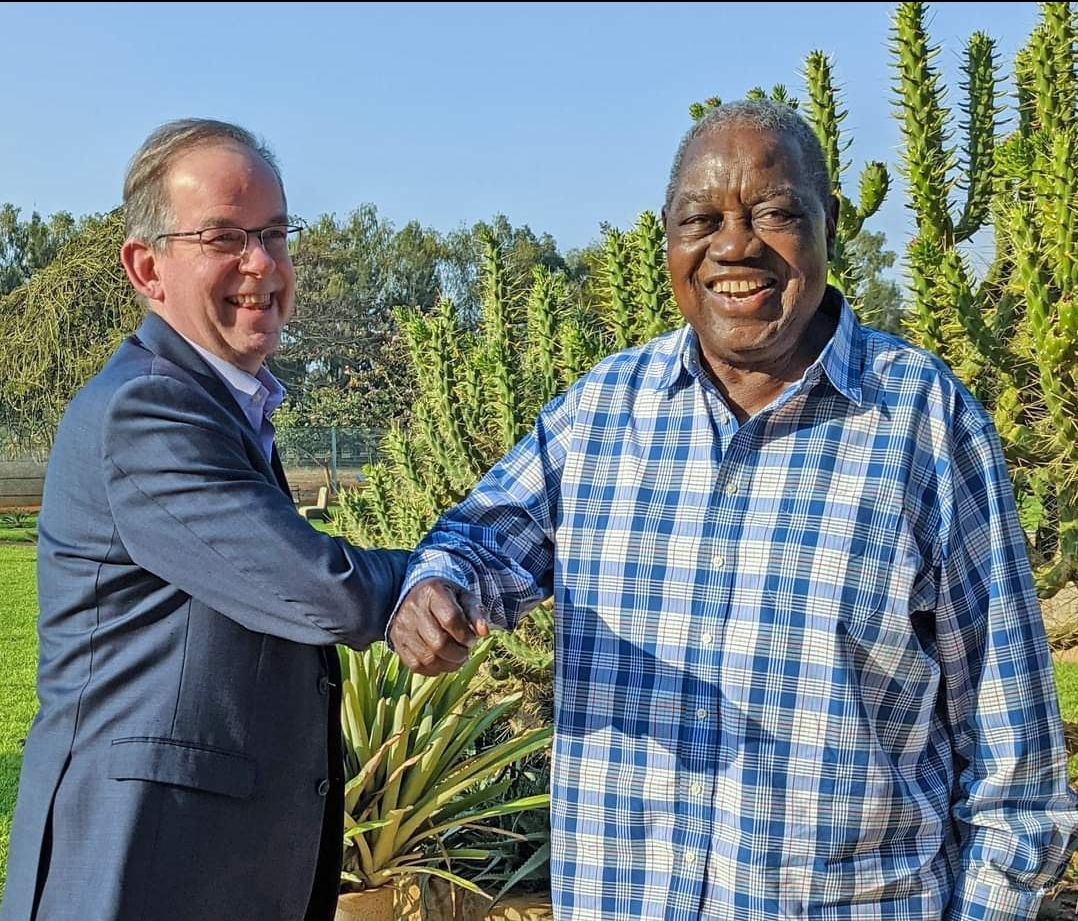
Banda in 2021 with U.S. ambassador David Young.

On 15 March 2013, Banda became the second head of state in Zambian history to have his presidential immunity revoked. This was due to accusations of abuse of authority, corruption, and the misappropriation of oil revenue by Sata.

== Death ==
Banda died at home in Lusaka from colon cancer on 11 March 2022, at the age of 85. After his death, the Zambian government announced seven days of national mourning with flags half-masted. and Namibia announced three days of mourning.

== Family ==
Rupiah Banda married his first wife, Hope Mwansa Makulu (29 August 1939 – 11 October 2000), in 1966 and the couple had three sons together. Makulu died in South Africa, at the age of 61. She was buried in Leopards Hill Cemetery.

His second wife, Thandiwe Banda, a political science teacher, was more than thirty years younger than Banda. Thandiwe Banda served as the First Lady of Zambia during his presidency from 2008 to 2011.

== Electoral history ==
Electoral history of Rupiah Banda
Year	Office	Party	Votes received				Result
Year	Office	Party	Total	%	P.	Swing	Result
2008	President of Zambia	MMD	718,359	40.63%	1st	—N/a	Won
2011	President of Zambia	MMD	987,866	36.15%	2nd	-4.48	Lost

Political offices
Preceded by Lupando Mwape	Vice-President of Zambia; 2006–2008	Succeeded by George Kunda
Preceded by Levy Mwanawasa	President of Zambia; 2008–2011	Succeeded by Michael Sata
