= Agreement on Trade in Essential Supplies =

Bilateral agreement between New Zealand and Singapore

The Agreement on Trade in Essential Supplies (AOTES) is a bilateral agreement between New Zealand and Singapore, signed on 4 May 2026. Recognized as the world's first legally binding agreement of its kind, the pact aims to guarantee the uninterrupted flow of critical goods between the two nations during times of global crises and supply chain disruptions. The agreement was signed at the Singapore-New Zealand Annual Leaders' Meeting in Singapore by New Zealand's Minister for Trade and Investment Todd McClay and Singapore's Minister-in-charge of Energy, Science and Technology Tan See Leng, and was witnessed by prime ministers Christopher Luxon and Lawrence Wong.

== Background ==
The necessity of the agreement stems from the existing economic relationship and deep mutual reliance between the two nations. New Zealand relies heavily on Singapore for its energy security, importing approximately one-third of its fuel needs from Singaporean refineries. This includes diesel, which is highly critical for underpinning New Zealand's freight systems, farming, and food production. New Zealand is also a crucial and trusted agricultural supplier for Singapore, providing approximately 14 percent of the city-state's total food imports. Dairy constitutes New Zealand's top export to Singapore, accounting for nearly 31.6 percent of its total exports, alongside significant provisions of meat, fruits, nuts, and edible oils.

The conceptual foundation of the AOTES builds upon the cooperative trust the two nations developed during the COVID-19 pandemic. It also serves to advance the broader Comprehensive Strategic Partnership (CSP), a framework signed by the two countries in October 2025 to cooperate more closely on trade, security, innovation, and supply chain resilience. Leaders from both nations framed the agreement as a direct countermeasure against the protectionist tendency of countries to "look inward" and shut down supply chains during difficult global events. The agreement will officially take effect and be added to the existing New Zealand–Singapore Free Trade Agreement once both countries conclude their respective domestic approval processes.

== Scope and Key Provisions ==
Under the agreement, both governments legally commit to avoiding the imposition of unnecessary export restrictions on a specified list of essential supplies. The protected items include food, fuel, medicines, healthcare products, and chemical and construction materials. The protected items include food, fuel, medicines, healthcare products, and chemical and construction materials.

In addition to preventing export bans, the AOTES establishes a formal framework that requires both countries to facilitate the movement of goods, share critical information, and engage in consultations before or during major supply chain disruptions. This mechanism is explicitly designed to provide businesses and consumers in both nations with greater confidence and stability during global emergencies.
