= List of heads of state and government salaries =

This is a list of salaries of heads of state and government per year, showing heads of state and heads of government where different, mainly in parliamentary systems. Often a leader is both in presidential systems. Some states have semi-presidential systems, where the head of government role is fulfilled by both the listed head of government and the head of state.

== Member states and observers of the United Nations, Hong Kong, Taiwan, and the European Union ==
GDP per capita means 2020 nominal GDP per capita in 2021 local currency units provided by the International Monetary Fund.

State	Head of state annual salary	Head of government annual salary	Head of state annual salary (USD from 2019 IMF exchange rate)	Head of government annual salary (USD from 2019 IMF exchange rate)	Head of state salary divided by 2020 GDP per capita	Head of government salary divided by 2020 GDP per capita	Reference
Afghanistan	؋2,745,000 (Leader)	؋2,379,000 (Prime Minister)	36,030	31,230	58	51	
Albania	L3,084,000 (President)	L2,744,760 (Prime Minister)	28,074	24,986	6	5	
Algeria	د.ج 8,400,000 (President)	د.ج 6,000,000 (Prime Minister)	70,000	50,000	20	14	
Andorra	N/A (monarch)	€65,748 (Prime Minister)	N/A (monarch)	73,603	N/A (monarch)	2	
Angola	Kz 7,681,200 (President)		21,054		7		
Antigua and Barbuda	EC$108,630 (Governor-General (Note: Vice-regal representative of the Monarch))	EC$150,000 (Prime Minister)	40,233	56,000			
Argentina	AR$2,496,000 (President)		51,840				
Armenia	֏ 15,840,000 (President)	֏ 14,280,000 (Prime Minister)	32,970	29,720			
Australia	A$495,000 (Governor-General)	A$564,360 (Prime Minister)	354,000	392,811			
Austria	US$378,666 (President)	€328,160 (Chancellor)	378,666	338,094			
Azerbaijan	₼180,000 (President)	₼28,872 (Prime Minister)	110,000	16,984			
Bahamas	B$37,000 (Governor-General)	B$86,000 (Prime Minister)	37,000	86,000			
Bahrain	N/A (monarch)	.د.ب 90,000 (Prime Minister)	N/A (monarch)	200,000	N/A (monarch)		
Bangladesh	৳1,440,000 (President)	৳1,380,000 (Prime Minister)	17,100	16,400			
Barbados	Bds$ 232,047 (President)	Bds$ 213,334 (Prime Minister)	116,024	106,667			
Belarus	33,600 USD (President)						
Belgium	N/A (monarch)	€221,000 (Prime Minister)	N/A (monarch)		N/A (monarch)		
Belize	26,241 USD (Governor-General)	45,500 USD (Prime Minister)					
Benin	29,810 USD (President)						
Bhutan	Druk Gyalpo	37,365 USD (Prime Minister)					
Bolivia	39,924 USD (President)						
Bosnia and Herzegovina	42,650 USD (Presidency)						
Botswana	P 1,075,056 (President)		99,950				
Brazil	102,524 USD (President, 2019)						
Brunei	N/A (monarch)		N/A (monarch)		N/A (monarch)		
Bulgaria	79,000 USD (President)	50,000 USD (Prime Minister)					
Burkina Faso	33,810 USD (President)	17,477 USD (Prime Minister)					
Burundi	47,300 USD (President)						
Cambodia	King	30,000 USD (Prime Minister)					
Cameroon	620,976 USD (President)						
Canada	290,000 USD (Governor General)	279,000 USD (Prime Minister)					
Cape Verde	20,380 USD (President)						
Central African Republic	42,524 USD (President)						
Chad	16,640 USD (President)						
Chile	196,000 USD (President)						
China	22,000 USD (Party General Secretary and President)	22,000 USD (Premier)					
Colombia	134,676 USD (President)						
Comoros	117,060 USD (President)						
Congo, Democratic Republic of the	51,500 USD (President)						
Republic of Congo	108,400 USD (President)						
Costa Rica	113,520 USD (President)						
Croatia	44,375 USD (President)	39,422 USD (Prime Minister)					
Cyprus	90,025 USD (President)						
Czech Republic	149,516.64 USD (President)	120,702.48 USD (Prime Minister)					
Kingdom of Denmark	11,350,744 USD (King) royal grant	249,774 USD (Prime Minister)					
Djibouti	10,000 USD (President)						
Dominica	33,671 USD (President)	21,666 USD (Prime Minister)					
Dominican Republic	120,000 USD (President)						
Ecuador	75,132 USD (President)						
Egypt	70,400 USD (President)						
El Salvador	62,172 USD (President)						
Equatorial Guinea	152,680 USD (President)						
Eritrea	6,000 USD (President)						
Estonia	74,595 USD (President)	74,595 USD (Prime Minister)					
Eswatini	56,051,336 USD (King) royal grant	51,600 USD (Prime Minister)					
Ethiopia	45,270 USD (President)	3,600 USD (Prime Minister)					
European Union	447,336 USD (President of the European Council)	364,000 USD (President of the European Commission)					
Fiji	62,784 USD (President)	113,495 USD (Prime Minister)					
Finland	141,367 USD (President)	163,906 USD (Prime Minister)					
France	194,300 USD (President)	220,500 USD (Prime Minister)					
Gabon	65,000 USD (President)						
Gambia, The	65,000 USD (President)						
Georgia	90,890 USD (President)	90,890 USD (Prime Minister)					
Germany	€369,500 (President)	€365,000 (Chancellor)	413,600	409,000			
Ghana	76,000 USD (President)						
Greece	154,739 USD (President)	82,405 USD (Prime Minister)					
Grenada	55,014 USD (Governor General)	29,859 USD (Prime Minister)					
Guatemala	178,680 USD (President)						
Guinea	22,390 USD (President)						
Guinea-Bissau	6,360 USD (President)						
Guyana	91,700 USD (President)	98,300 USD (Prime Minister)					
Haiti	3,782 USD (President)						
Honduras	49,908 USD (President)						
Hong Kong	568,400 USD (Chief Executive)						
Hungary	250,800 USD (President)	274,800 USD (Prime Minister)					
Iceland	317,000 USD (President)	242,619 USD (Prime Minister)					
India	84,500 USD (President)	66,000 USD (Prime Minister)					
Indonesia	51,600 USD (President)						
Iran	0 USD (Supreme Leader)	20,400 USD (President)					
Iraq	809,673 USD (President)	96,000 USD (Prime Minister)					
Ireland	401,000 USD (President)	237,000 USD (Taoiseach)					
Israel	173,000 USD (President)	₪657,144 (Prime Minister)					
Italy	275,147 USD (President)	131,608 USD (Prime Minister)					
Ivory Coast	100,000 USD (President)						
Jamaica	70,400 USD (Governor-General)	57,545 USD (Prime Minister)					
Japan	3,075,316 USD (Emperor) royal grant	316,521 USD (Prime Minister)					
Jordan	847,457 USD (King)	253,800 USD (Prime Minister)					
Kazakhstan	20,400 USD (President)	2,630 USD (Prime Minister)					
Kenya	192,200 USD (President)	173,300 USD (Deputy President)					
Kiribati	89,246 USD (President)	71,397 USD (Vice President)					
Kuwait	165,000,000 USD (Emir) royal allocation	Prime Minister					
Kyrgyzstan	18,800 USD (President)	12,800 USD (Prime Minister)					
Laos	1,630 USD (Party General Secretary and President)						
Latvia	70,718 USD (President)	59,644 USD (Prime Minister)					
Lebanon	150,000 USD (President)	141,900 USD (Prime Minister)					
Lesotho	52,778 USD (King) privy purse	36,650 USD (Prime Minister)					
Liberia	90,000 USD (President)						
Libya	105,000 USD (President)						
Liechtenstein	0 USD (Prince)	254,660 USD (Prime Minister)					
Lithuania	86,136 USD (President)	50,100 (Prime Minister)					
Luxembourg	12,333,102 USD (Grand Duke) royal grant	278,000 USD (Prime Minister)					
Madagascar	President	18,500 USD (Prime Minister)					
Malawi	74,300 USD (President)						
Malaysia	263,500 USD (Yang di-Pertuan Agong)	61,844 USD (Prime Minister)					
Maldives	77,768 USD (President)						
Mali	68,900 USD (President)	23,280 USD (Prime Minister)					
Malta	70,955 USD (President)	56,900 USD (Prime Minister)					
Marshall Islands	60,000 USD (President)						
Mauritania	300,000 USD (President)						
Mauritius	93,783 USD (President)	187,968 USD (Prime Minister)					
Mexico	67,903 USD (President)						
Micronesia	32,000 USD (President)	30,000 USD (Vice President)					
Moldova	9,264 USD (President)	6,433 USD (Prime Minister)					
Monaco	52,063,000 USD (Prince) royal grant	202,000 USD (Minister of State)					
Mongolia	11,620 USD (President)	11,390 USD (Prime Minister)					
Montenegro	33,440 USD (President)	15,522 USD (Prime Minister)					
Morocco	488,604 USD (King)	62,500 USD (Prime Minister)					
Mozambique	46,800 USD (President)						
Myanmar	40,980 USD (President)	32,784 USD (Vice President)					
Namibia	99,241 USD (President)	76,339 USD (Prime Minister)					
Nauru	74,411 USD (President)						
Nepal	17,584 USD (President)	9,033 USD (Prime Minister)					
Netherlands	6,082,736 USD (King) royal grant	193,844 USD (Prime Minister)					
New Zealand	260,245 USD (Governor-General)	325,546 USD (Prime Minister)					
Nicaragua	38,316 USD (President)						
Niger	President	Prime Minister					
Nigeria	69,000 USD (President)						
North Korea	Party General Secretary and President of State Affairs	Premier					
North Macedonia	17,250 USD (President)	15,600 USD (Prime Minister)					
Norway	33,237,000 USD (King) royal grant	210,714 USD (Prime Minister)					
Oman	7,238,000 USD (Sultan) privy purse 1975						
Pakistan	65,794 USD (President)	13,553 USD (Prime Minister)					
Palau	90,000 USD (President)						
Palestine	120,000 USD (President)	48,000 USD (Prime Minister)					
Panama	84,000 USD (President)						
Papua New Guinea	56,249 USD (Governor General)	107,532 USD (Prime Minister)					
Paraguay	103,044 USD (President)						
Peru	56,530 USD (President)	51,537 USD (Prime Minister)					
Philippines	95,554 USD (President)						
Poland	70,026 USD (President)	57,772 USD (Prime Minister)					
Portugal	96,469 USD (President)	72,352 USD (Prime Minister)					
Qatar	36,000,000 USD (Emir) royal grant						
Romania	61,296 USD (President)	61,296 USD (Prime Minister)					
Russia	136,000 USD (President)	105,000 USD (Prime Minister)					
Rwanda	85,000 USD (President)						
Saint Kitts and Nevis	51,000 USD (Governor General)	50,844 USD (Prime Minister)					
Saint Lucia	36,111 USD (Governor General)	50,685 USD (Prime Minister)					
Saint Vincent and the Grenadines	45,042 USD (Governor General)	55,724 USD (Prime Minister)					
Samoa	82,000 USD (Head of State)	78,000 USD (Prime Minister)					
San Marino	83,682 USD (Both Captains Regent)						
São Tomé and Príncipe	2,930 USD (President)	2,100 USD (Prime Minister)					
Saudi Arabia	9,600,000,000 USD (King) royal allowance	132,400 USD (Ministers)					
Senegal	15,210 USD (President)						
Serbia	14,950 USD (President)	13,736 USD (Prime Minister)					
Seychelles	23,700 USD (President)	21,800 USD (Vice President)					
Sierra Leone	12,220 USD (President)						
Singapore	1,989,000 USD (President)	2,841,000 USD (Prime Minister)					
Slovakia	129,284 USD (President)	70,973 USD (Prime Minister)					
Slovenia	80,142 USD (President)	87,818 USD (Prime Minister)					
Solomon Islands	130,000. USD (Governor-General)	58,631.05 USD (Prime Minister)					
Somalia	120,000 USD (President)						
South Africa	223,500 USD (President)						
South Korea	211,320 USD (President)						
South Sudan	60,000 USD (President)						
Spain	304,055 USD (King) royal grant	97,926 USD (Prime Minister)					
Sri Lanka	7,380 USD (President)	5,600 USD (Prime Minister)					
Sudan	29,320 USD (President)						
Suriname	133,560 USD (President)	116,870 USD (Vice President)					
Sweden	15,752,000 USD (King) royal grant	244,615 USD (Prime Minister)					
Switzerland	507,000 USD (President)	495,000 USD (Federal Council)					
Syria	N/A (President)						
Taiwan	180,000 USD (President)	121,500 USD (Premier)					
Tajikistan	13,200 USD (President)						
Tanzania	47,300 USD (President)	45,000 USD (Prime Minister)					
Thailand	King	46,000 USD (Prime Minister)					
Timor-Leste	30,000 USD (President)	27,000 USD (Prime Minister)					
Togo	President						
Tonga	2,129,540 USD (King) royal grant	41,504 USD (Prime Minister)					
Trinidad and Tobago	54,600 USD (President)	85,600 USD (Prime Minister)					
Tunisia	16,700 USD (President)	33,355 USD (Prime Minister)					
Turkey	~US$70,000 (President)						
Turkmenistan	10,800 USD (President)						
Tuvalu	17,660 USD (Governor-General)	19,808 USD (Prime Minister)					
Uganda	183,216 USD (President)						
Ukraine	11,600 USD (President)	3,840 USD (Prime Minister)					
United Arab Emirates	US$4,608,273,000 (President) privy purse	261,400 USD (Prime Minister)					
United States	400,000 USD (President)						
United Kingdom		198,317 USD (Prime Minister)					
Uruguay	139,608 USD (President)						
Uzbekistan	15,600 USD (President)						
Vanuatu	32,295 USD (President)	32,295 USD (Prime Minister)					
Vatican City	0 USD (Pope)						
Venezuela	48,816 USD (President)						
Vietnam	11,103 USD (President)	10,676 USD (Prime Minister)					
Yemen	15,300 USD (President)	12,040 USD (Prime Minister)					
Zambia	63,100 USD (President)	43,800 USD (Vice President)					
Zimbabwe	146,590 USD (President)						

== Other states ==
The following states control their territory and are recognized by at least one UN member state.

State	Also claimed by	Head of state (USD)	Head of government (USD)
Abkhazia	Georgia		
Kosovo	Serbia	39,650 USD (President)	40,519 USD (Prime Minister)
Northern Cyprus	Cyprus		39,028 USD (Prime Minister)
Sahrawi Arab Democratic Republic	Morocco		
South Ossetia	Georgia		
Taiwan	China	180,000 USD (President)	121,500 USD (Premier)
Somaliland	Somalia		

The following state/government controls its territory, but is not recognized by any UN member states.

State/Government	Also claimed by	Head of state (USD)	Head of government (USD)
Transnistria	Moldova		
