= Lupando Mwape =

Zambian politician (1950–2019)

9th Vice-President of Zambia
- In office 4 October 2004 – September 2006
- President: Levy Mwanawasa
- Preceded by: Nevers Mumba
- Succeeded by: Rupiah Banda

Personal details
- Born: 15 July 1950
- Died: 21 January 2009 (aged 58) Johannesburg, South Africa
- Party: Movement for Multi-Party Democracy

Lupando Mwape (15 July 1950 – 21 January 2019) was a Zambian politician. He served as the ninth vice-president of Zambia from 2004 to 2006 under President Levy Mwanawasa, who indicated that, had Mwape not been defeated in the 2006 parliamentary election, he would almost certainly have been re-appointed vice-president. Mwape was succeeded by Rupiah Banda, who became president on Mwanawasa's death in 2008. He died in 2019 at the age of 68. And has a name sake Lupando Chipimo.

Mwape died in Johannesburg, South Africa in January 2019 at the age of 68.

== Education ==
- Qualified Bachelor of Engineering and Educationalist in the Technical establishment,
- Aeronautical El,
- Aircraft Maintenance Engineer, Technical and Vocational Lecturer,
- Aircraft Inspector,
- Educational Administrator, Team Leader, Curriculum Development Advisor,
- Examiner and Moderator of Electro-Sciences and Engineering and Aviation Programmes.
- Started career as an engineer and later an Educationalist and held a degree in Aero - El, Dip. Tech. Education, UK Airworthiness Certificate and possessed an AME Certificate, membership of the Engineering Institute of Zambia (MEIZ) and MBA (Student).

== Positions held ==
- Elected Member of Parliament. September 2000
- Appointed Minister of Communications and Transport. And concurrently served as Chairman of Africa Telecommunications Union (ATU); May 2001
- Member of the Zambia National Tender Board (ZNTB); Co-chair of TAZARA Council of Ministers and became chair from 2002 - 2003;
- Appointed Northern Province Provincial Minister, between June and October 2004.
- At Party level, was co-opted MMD Northern Province Vice-chairman in 2001 and became chairman from April 2003.
- In October 2004, was co-opted MMD National Trustee until July 2005 and was elected MMD National Trustee the position held until November 2006.
- Served as Vice President of the Republic of Zambia from October 2004 to October 2006.
- As Resident Ambassador to P.R. China 2007–2009, Lupando Augustine Festus K. Mwape was a Non-Residential Ambassador to DPR Korea, Kingdom of Thailand, Kingdom of Cambodia, Mongolia, Lao People's Democratic Republic, Vietnam, Pakistan and Afghanistan.

== See also ==
- List of vice presidents of Zambia

Political offices
Preceded by Nevers Mumba	Vice-President of Zambia; 2004–2006	Succeeded by Rupiah Banda
