= Marsiling–Yew Tee Group Representation Constituency =

Electoral division in Singapore

Coordinates: 1.41°N 103.76°E

Marsiling–Yew Tee
- Group representation constituency for the Parliament of Singapore
- Region: North and West Regions, Singapore
- Electorate: 119,559

Current constituency
- Created: 24 July 2015; 11 years ago
- Seats: 4
- Party: People's Action Party
- Members: Lawrence Wong; Alex Yam; Hany Soh; Zaqy Mohamad
- Town Council: Marsiling–Yew Tee
- Created from: Chua Chu Kang GRC; Sembawang GRC

The Marsiling–Yew Tee Group Representation Constituency is a four-member group representation constituency (GRC) in northern and western Singapore. It has four divisions: Limbang, Marsiling, Woodgrove, and Yew Tee, managed by Marsiling–Yew Tee Town Council. The current Members of Parliament (MPs) for the constituency are Prime Minister and Minister of Finance Lawrence Wong, Alex Yam, Hany Soh and Acting Minister-in-charge of Muslim Affairs Zaqy Mohamad from the governing People's Action Party (PAP).

== History ==
=== 2015: Creation of GRC ===
Prior to the 2015 general election, Marsiling–Yew Tee GRC was formed with four MPs from the existing GRCs of Chua Chu Kang and Sembawang. Led by Lawrence Wong, Minister for Culture, Community and Youth and MP for West Coast GRC, and Halimah Yacob, Speaker of Parliament and MP for Jurong GRC, the PAP defeated the Singapore Democratic Party (SDP) with 68.73% of the vote.

==== 2017: Resignation of Halimah Yacob ====
On 7 August 2017, Halimah, the MP for the Marsiling division of the GRC, resigned as Speaker, an MP and a member of the PAP in order to contest in the presidential election in the same year.

The next day, Zaqy Mohamad, incumbent MP for Chua Chu Kang GRC, was appointed as the grassroots advisor (Note: An individual appointed for "grassroots engagement and outreach" in a GRC division or single-member constituency (SMC) who, according to the People's Association (PA), has to be aligned with the "Government of the day"; in practice, they are a member of the PAP. They do not need to be the elected MP for the area.) for Halimah's Marsiling division. Halimah had been the sole minority MP for Marsiling–Yew Tee GRC prior to her resignation. (Note: Every team in a GRC is legally required to contain at least one minority (i.e. non-Chinese) candidate, either Malay or Indian/other (other being not Chinese, Malay or Indian). The mandatory minority category in a GRC is determined by the President. The number of GRCs requiring Malay candidates at a general election must be three-fifths of the total number of GRCs, or, if that is fractional, the next highest whole number.) When queried by Pritam Singh, Workers' Party (WP) MP for Aljunied GRC, on said status of Halimah, the government maintained that it was legal to forgo by-elections in GRCs. Justice Chua Lee Ming of the High Court dismissed a bid by Wong Souk Yee, the assistant treasurer of the SDP, to initiate a by-election. The bid was dismissed by the Court of Appeal upon appeal.

=== 2020: PAP personnel changes ===
During the 2020 general election, Hany Soh, a political newcomer, became a PAP candidate for Marsiling–Yew Tee GRC; she was assigned to the Woodgrove division, replacing retiring incumbent Ong Teng Koon. Zaqy became a candidate for the constituency; he remained assigned to Marsiling, having served as a grassroots advisor there. Led again by Wong, the PAP team defeated the SDP with 63.18% of the vote.

==== 2024: Becoming the Prime Minister's constituency ====
In 2024, Wong, the MP for the Limbang division of Marsiling–Yew Tee GRC, became the Prime Minister of Singapore.

=== 2025: PAP entrenchment ===
During the 2025 general election, the unchanged PAP team was re-elected with 73.48% of the vote against the SDP, a swing in their favour of over 10% and the best PAP performance in the GRC since its creation.

== Members of Parliament ==
Divisions or wards of Marsiling–Yew Tee GRC as of the 2025 general election:
1 Limbang (part)
2 Limbang (part)
3 Marsiling
4 Woodgrove
5 Yew Tee

Year	Division	Members of Parliament	Party
Formation
2015	Yew Tee; Woodgrove; Marsiling; Limbang	Alex Yam; Ong Teng Koon; Halimah Yacob (2015 – 2017) (Note: Resigned from Parliament and the PAP to run for President. Zaqy replaced her as the grassroots advisor for Marsiling before being elected MP for Marsiling–Yew Tee GRC in his own right in 2020.); Lawrence Wong	PAP
2020	Yew Tee; Woodgrove; Marsiling; Limbang	Alex Yam; Hany Soh; Zaqy Mohamad; Lawrence Wong	PAP
2025	Yew Tee; Woodgrove; Marsiling; Limbang	Alex Yam; Hany Soh; Zaqy Mohamad; Lawrence Wong	PAP

== Electoral results ==
Note: The Elections Department does not include rejected votes when calculating the vote shares of candidates. Hence, all candidates' vote shares will total to 100% at any given election (may not appear so in multi-way contests due to rounding).

=== Elections in 2010s ===
General Election 2015
Party	Candidate	Votes	%
PAP	Ong Teng Koon Lawrence Wong Alex Yam Halimah Yacob	68,485	68.73
SDP	Wong Souk Yee John Tan Bryan Lim Damanhuri Abas	31,157	31.27
Majority		37,328	37.46
Total valid votes			
Rejected ballots		2,134	2.0
Turnout		101,776	94.59
PAP win (new seat)			

=== Elections in 2020s ===
General Election 2020
Party	Candidate	Votes	%	±%
PAP	Lawrence Wong Alex Yam Hany Soh Zaqy Mohamad	69,813	63.18	▼5.55
SDP	Benjamin Pwee Bryan Lim Damanhuri Abas Khung Wai Yeen	40,690	36.82	▲5.55
Majority		29,123	26.36	
Total valid votes		110,503	98.14	
Rejected ballots		2,097	1.86	
Turnout		112,600	96.18	▲1.59
Registered electors		117,077		
PAP hold		Swing	▼5.55	

General Election 2025
Party	Candidate	Votes	%	±%
PAP	Lawrence Wong Alex Yam Hany Soh Zaqy Mohamad	81,143	73.48	▲10.30
SDP	Jufri Salim Alec Tok Gigene Wong Ariffin Sha	29,281	26.52	▼10.30
Majority		51,862	46.96	▲20.60
Total valid votes		110,424	98.51	▲0.37
Rejected ballots		1,668	1.49	▼0.37
Turnout		112,092	93.75	▼2.43
Registered electors		119,559		▲2.12
PAP hold		Swing	▲10.30	
