= Muchinga (constituency) =

Constituency of the National Assembly of Zambia

Muchinga is a constituency of the National Assembly of Zambia. It covers the towns of Chibale, Chisomo and Lukusashi in Serenje District of Central Province.

== List of MPs ==
Election year	MP	Party
Muchinga
1962	Aaron Milner	United National Independence Party
Seat abolished
1991	Nathan Mungilashi	Movement for Multi-Party Democracy
1996	Pierre Chisenga	Movement for Multi-Party Democracy
2001	Ackson Kalunga	Movement for Multi-Party Democracy
2006	George Kunda	Movement for Multi-Party Democracy
2011	George Kunda	Movement for Multi-Party Democracy
2012 (by-election)	Howard Kunda	Movement for Multi-Party Democracy
2016	Howard Kunda	Movement for Multi-Party Democracy
2021	Emmanuel Banda	Independent
Lukusashi
2026	Andrew Mpyakula	United Party for National Development
