= Vice President of Zambia =

Second-highest office in Zambia

Vice President of the Republic of Zambia
- Coat of arms of Zambia

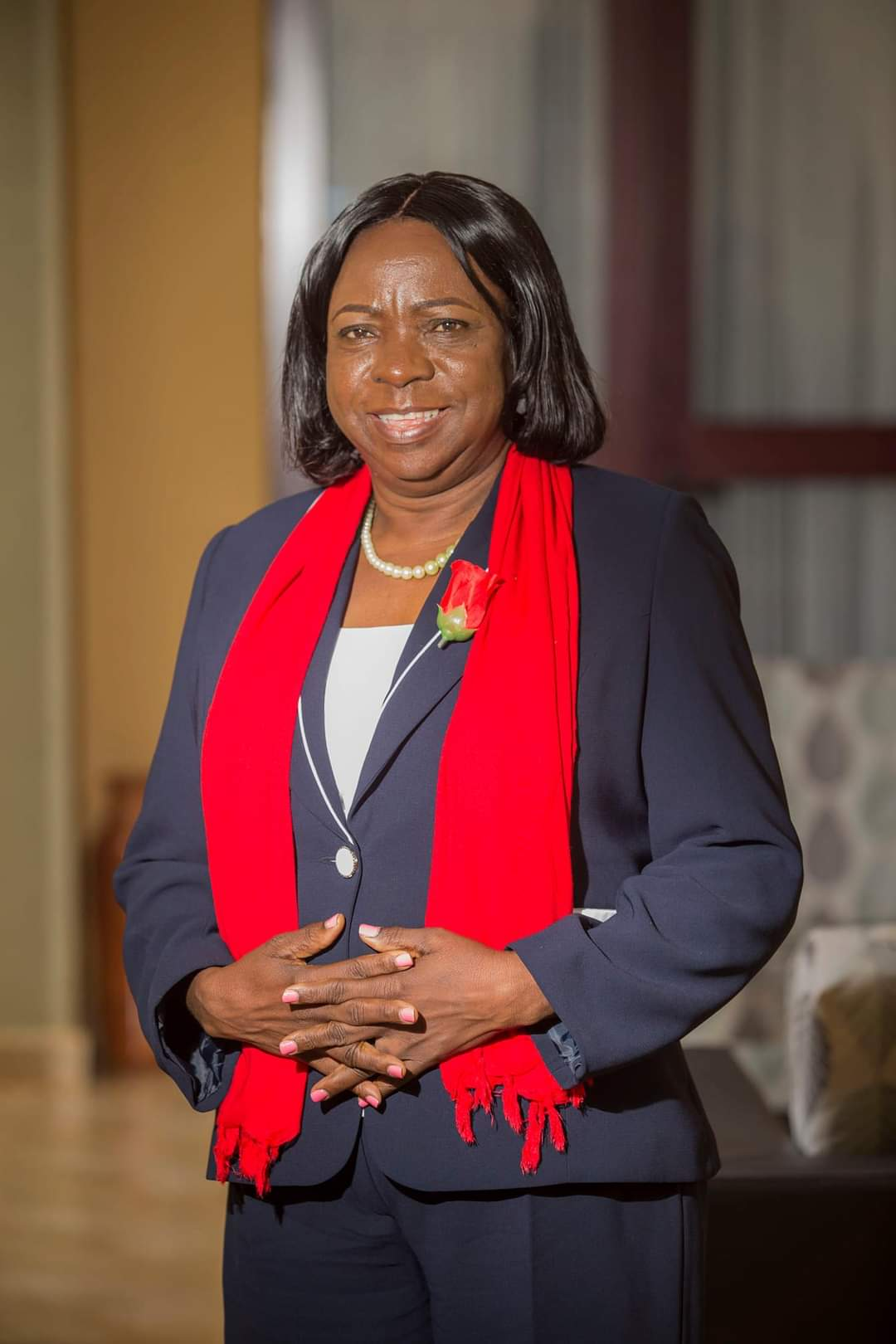
- Incumbent; Mutale Nalumango since 24 August 2021
- Style: Madam Vice President (informal); The Honorable (formal); Her Excellency (diplomatic)
- Abbreviation: VP
- Term length: 5 years, renewable once
- Inaugural holder: Reuben Kamanga
- Formation: October 1964
- Salary: 43,800 USD annually
- Website: Official website

The vice president of Zambia is the second highest position in the executive branch of the Republic of Zambia. The vice president was previously appointed by the president before the amendment of the Constitution in 2016. Under the amended Constitution, when the president dies, resigns or is removed from office, the vice president automatically assumes the presidency, unlike when the Constitution demanded holding of presidential by-election within 90 days. This is so because now every presidential candidate shall pick a vice presidential running mate and the two will share the vote meaning voting for a president is an automatic vote for the vice president.

The vice president also heads the Office of the Vice President, a government ministry, and is also automatically a member of the National Assembly.

Rupiah Banda became acting president on 19 August 2008 following the death of President Levy Mwanawasa, while Guy Scott became acting president 28 October 2014 following the death of President Michael Sata. Banda was elected president in the subsequent election, and Scott did not stand.

== List of officeholders ==
Political parties

United National Independence Party (UNIP)
Movement for Multi-Party Democracy (MMD)
Patriotic Front (PF)
United Party for National Development (UPND)

| No. | Portrait | Name (Birth–Death) | Term of office | | Political party |
| No. | Portrait | Name (Birth–Death) | Took office | Left office | Political party |
|---|---|---|---|---|---|
| 1 | | Reuben Kamanga (1929–1996) | 24 October 1964 | October 1967 | UNIP |
| 2 | | Simon Kapwepwe (1922–1980) | October 1967 | October 1970 | UNIP |
| 3 | | Mainza Chona (1930–2001) | October 1970 | August 1973 | UNIP |
Post abolished (August 1973 – 7 November 1991)
| 4 | | Levy Mwanawasa (1948–2008) | 7 November 1991 | 3 July 1994 | MMD |
| 5 | | Godfrey Miyanda (born 1944) | 4 July 1994 | 2 December 1997 | MMD |
| 6 | | Christon Tembo (1944–2009) | 2 December 1997 | April 2001 | MMD |
| 7 | | Enoch Kavindele (born 1950) | 4 May 2001 | 29 May 2003 | MMD |
| 8 | | Nevers Mumba (born 1960) | 29 May 2003 | 4 October 2004 | MMD |
| 9 | | Lupando Mwape (1950–2019) | 4 October 2004 | September 2006 | MMD |
| 10 | | Rupiah Banda (1937–2022) | 9 October 2006 | 2 November 2008 | MMD |
| 11 | | George Kunda (1956–2012) | 2 November 2008 | 23 September 2011 | MMD |
| 12 | | Guy Scott (1944–2026) | 23 September 2011 | 28 October 2014 | PF |
Post vacant (28 October 2014 – 26 January 2015) (Note: The Vice Presidency became vacant following Guy Scott's ascension to the Presidency.)
| 13 | | Inonge Wina (born 1941) | 26 January 2015 | 24 August 2021 | PF |
| 14 | | Mutale Nalumango (born 1955) | 24 August 2021 | Incumbent | UPND |

== See also ==
- List of current vice presidents
