= Ong Teng Koon =

Singaporean businessman and former politician

The Honourable Ong Teng Koon
- 王鼎昆

Member of the Singapore Parliament
- In office 11 September 2015 – 23 June 2020
- Preceded by: Constituency established
- Succeeded by: PAP held
- Constituency: Marsiling–Yew Tee GRC
- Majority: 37,328 (37.46%)
- In office 7 May 2011 – 25 August 2015
- Preceded by: PAP held
- Succeeded by: PAP held
- Constituency: Sembawang GRC
- Majority: 36,647 (27.8%)

Personal details
- Born: Ong Teng Koon; 13 January 1977 (age 49) Singapore
- Party: People's Action Party
- Education: London School of Economics; Princeton University
- Occupation: Businessman; politician (former)

Ong Teng Koon (Note: Chinese: 王鼎昆; pinyin: Wáng Dǐngkūn; Pe̍h-ōe-jī: Ông Téng-khun) (born 13 January 1977) is a Singaporean businessman and former politician. A member of the governing People's Action Party (PAP), he was the Member of Parliament (MP) for the Woodgrove division of Sembawang Group Representation Constituency (GRC) between 2011 and 2015 and the same division in Marsiling–Yew Tee GRC between 2015 and 2020. As a businessman, he worked at Goldman Sachs and Deutsche Bank before being elected to Parliament.

== Education ==
Ong attended Ai Tong Primary School and received his secondary education from Raffles Institution (RI) before attending the now-defunct Raffles Junior College (RJC). In 2001, he graduated from the London School of Economics with a first-class honours degree in economics; he then studied for a master's degree in finance from Princeton University in 2003.

== Career ==
Ong is a businessman. He worked as a commodities trader at Goldman Sachs in Chicago and Tokyo from 2003 to 2008 and at Deutsche Bank in 2009. He returned to Singapore in 2009. As of March 2015, he had been a commodities trader at Morgan Stanley since 2009.

In 2014, Ong became the third vice-president of the Singapore Wushu Dragon and Lion Dance Federation. In 2024, he was reported to be the managing director for Singaporean energy corporation SP PowerInterconnect.

== Political career ==
In 2009, Ong began volunteering for the PAP in the Chong Pang division of Sembawang GRC, working for K. Shanmugam, who was then the Minister for Law and Home Affairs. He later worked in the Marsiling division under Hawazi Daipi.

In April 2011, during the leadup to the general election in the same year, Ong made his political debut as a PAP candidate for the five-member Sembawang GRC. He became the MP for the Woodgrove division of the GRC after the PAP team defeated the Singapore Democratic Party (SDP) with 63.9% of the vote.

In 2013, Ong stated in Parliament that he opposed a motion, proposed by MP for Moulmein–Kallang GRC Denise Phua, to increase the income tax rates of wealthy Singaporeans; he believed that it would cause a net loss of taxes by driving immigration from Singapore. The proposal would increase income tax by 1 p.p. for individuals earning between S$500,000 and $1 million and 1 more p.p., up to 25, per $500,000 in excess of $1 million.

During the 2015 general election, the Woodgrove division was redistricted into the newly created Marsiling–Yew Tee GRC; Ong was subsequently reassigned to said constituency alongside three other members of the PAP. The PAP team defeated the SDP with 68.73% of the vote.

In 2019, Ong stated in Parliament that the government needed to further subsidise the cost of parenting, describing the low fertility rate and ageing as "existential issues" for the survival of Singapore. He suggested increased subsidies for childcare and infant care and remote working for mothers, and emphasised that there was a need to keep income taxes low.

On 28 June 2020, ahead of the general election in the same year, Ong retired from politics. The PAP replaced him with Hany Soh.

On 9 August 2024, Prime Minister Lawrence Wong, who was also the incumbent MP for the Limbang division of Marsiling–Yew Tee GRC, announced at his division's National Day dinner that Ong had been appointed as a second grassroots advisor for the division. (Note: An individual appointed for "grassroots engagement and outreach" in a GRC division or single-member constituency (SMC) who, according to the People's Association (PA), has to be aligned with the "Government of the day"; in practice, they are a member of the PAP. They do not need to be the elected MP for the area.) Ong said that he "ancitipated to meet residents and grassroots leaders" when queried about the key responsibilities of the position.

== Personal life ==
Ong is an only child; his father was Ong Ah Heng, a former PAP MP for the defunct Nee Soon Central Single Member Constituency (SMC) who died in 2026. He is married and speaks English, Mandarin, Hokkien and Cantonese. Prior to the 2011 general election, he was reportedly living in a public apartment in Ang Mo Kio. He is Hokkien with ancestry from Nan'an, Fujian.
