= Pre-election day events of the 2025 Singaporean general election =

List of notable events prior to the 2025 Singaporean general election:

== New and outgoing members ==
=== New candidates ===
The following is a list of known candidates contesting in the election for the first time. The PAP originally announced that there are 30 new candidates, but this number was later revised to 32. There are a total of 89 debuting candidates from 11 political parties this election.

Name	Age	Occupation	Party	Contested Constituency
Alia Mattar	43	Legal counsel and solicitor; daughter of former cabinet minister Ahmad Mattar	WP	Punggol GRC
Syed Alwi Ahmad	57	Private school teacher, Insworld	RDU	Nee Soon GRC
Adrian Ang	42	Former Temasek Polytechnic lecturer and Director, Chye Thiam Maintenance Pte Ltd	PAP	Aljunied GRC
Arbaah Haroun	50	Sales merchant, Audra	PPP	Tampines GRC
Ariffin Sha	27	Filmmaker, journalist and founder, Wake Up Singapore	SDP	Marsiling–Yew Tee GRC
Jackson Au	35	Communications executive, London Stock Exchange Group	WP	Punggol GRC
Cai Yinzhou	35	Social entrepreneur and executive director, Chinatown Heritage Centre	PAP	Bishan–Toa Payoh GRC
Ridhuan Chandran	53	Auditor and associate fellow, Singapore Institute of Aerospace Engineers	SUP	Ang Mo Kio GRC
Charlene Chen	42	Assistant professor, Nanyang Technological University (Marketing)	PAP	Tampines GRC
Elysa Chen	41	Executive director, CampusImpact	PAP	Bishan–Toa Payoh GRC
Eileen Chong	33	Insights & Innovation Lead, Asia Philanthropy Circle; former diplomat, Ministry of Foreign Affairs	WP	Tampines GRC
Raiyian Chia	46	Swimming coach and private-hire driver	NSP	Sembawang GRC
Chia Yun Kai	32	Entrepreneur, SingaporeRaw	SDA	Pasir Ris–Changi GRC
Chiu Shin Kong	51	Freelance private tutor	PAR	Jalan Besar GRC
Choo Pei Ling	40	Faculty member, Singapore Institute of Technology	PAP	Chua Chu Kang GRC
Alexis Dang	39	Director of publisher business development, Teads	WP	Punggol GRC
Dinesh Vasu Dash	50	Former Chief Executive, Agency for Integrated Care (AIC)	PAP	East Coast GRC
Elmie Nekmat	43	Lecturer, National University of Singapore	PAP	Sengkang GRC
Faisal Abdul Aziz	37	Dental surgeon and Clinical Director, Nuffield Holdings	PAP	Aljunied GRC
Foo Cexiang	40	Vice-president, PSA International; Director, Ministry of Transport (Private and Future Mobility)	PAP	Tanjong Pagar GRC
Gho Sze Kee	46	Shipping Lawyer, AsiaLegal	PAP	Mountbatten SMC
Bernadette Giam	38	Director, Creative Eateries	PAP	Sengkang GRC
Rickson Giauw	67	Safety advisor	PAR	Tanjong Pagar GRC
Goh Hanyan	38	Former director, Smart Nation and AI policy	PAP	Nee Soon GRC
Goh Pei Ming	42	Former Singapore Army Chief of Staff and brigadier general	PAP	Marine Parade–Braddell Heights GRC
Hamid Razak	39	Consultant Surgeon, Total Orthopaedic	PAP	West Coast–Jurong West GRC
Harish Mohanadas	39	Principal Software Engineer	RDU	Jurong East–Bukit Batok GRC
Hazlina Abdul Halim	40	Mediacorp presenter and journalist	PAP	East Coast GRC
Heng Zheng Dao	24	Horticulturist	PPP	Ang Mo Kio GRC
Martinn Ho	64	In-house Consultant, Fire Terminator International Pte Ltd	PPP	Ang Mo Kio GRC
David Hoe	37	Director of philanthropy, Majurity Trust	PAP	Jurong East–Bukit Batok GRC
Jagathishwaran Rajo	38	Executive Secretary, Inland Revenue Authority of Singapore Staff Union (IRASSU)	PAP	Aljunied GRC
Jufri Salim	41	Consultant, Institute of Ergonomics and Hygiene; husband of Surayah Akbar	SDP	Marsiling–Yew Tee GRC
Jasper Kuan	47	Product lead, Visa Worldwide	WP	East Coast GRC
Theodora Lai	39	Director, Moringa Ventures; principal, Tembusu Partners	PAP	Sengkang GRC
Gabriel Lam	42	Chief operating officer, Shalom Movers Group	PAP	Sembawang GRC
Jackson Lam	40	Principal Industrial Relations Officer, Building Construction and Timber Industries Employees' Union (BATU)	PAP	Nee Soon GRC
Jasmin Lau	42	Former Deputy secretary (policy), Ministry of Health	PAP	Ang Mo Kio GRC
Cassandra Lee	33	Grassroots volunteer and lawyer, EY	PAP	West Coast–Jurong West GRC
Lee Hui Ying	36	Investment Management Professional, Goldman Sachs; and communication director, Temasek Foundation	PAP	Nee Soon GRC
Samuel Lee	33	Unemployed	PPP	Ang Mo Kio GRC
Valerie Lee	44	Head of corporate affairs, Sembcorp	PAP	Pasir Ris–Changi GRC
Lee Wei	50	Associate Lecturer, Republic Polytechnic	NSP	Sembawang GRC
Marshall Lim	38	Criminal lawyer, Martin & Partners LLP, and former deputy public prosecutor, Attorney-General's Chamber	PAP	Hougang SMC
Lim Rui Xian	46	Self-employee	SPP	Bishan–Toa Payoh GRC
William Lim	43	Limousine service provider	PPP	Ang Mo Kio GRC
Sharon Lin	40	Senior IT consultant	RDU	Nee Soon GRC
Daniel Liu	40	Managing director, MORROW Architects; son of Liu Thai Ker	PAP	Aljunied GRC
Darryl Lo	28	Singapore Management University law graduate and former OpenSea employee	Independent	Radin Mas SMC
Shawn Loh	38	Former director, Ministry of Finance (security and resilience programmes); deputy group director, Commonwealth Capital Group	PAP	Jalan Besar GRC
Andre Low	34	Strategy consultant, Boston Consulting Group	WP	Jalan Kayu SMC
Mahaboob Batcha	57	Business director	PAR	Queenstown SMC
Abdul Muhaimin	36	Senior Property Manager, Aljunied-Hougang Town Council	WP	Sengkang GRC
Vere Nathan	27	Landscaping executive	PPP	Tampines GRC
David Neo	47	Former Chief of Singapore Army	PAP	Tampines GRC
Marcus Neo	33	Marketing director, Three Little Pigs	RDU	Jurong East–Bukit Batok GRC
Nigel Ng	39	Flight attendant	SUP	Ang Mo Kio GRC
Ng Shi Xuan	35	Director, Powermark Battery & Hardware Trading Pte Ltd	PAP	Sembawang GRC
Nizar Subair	57	Operations manager	RDU	Holland–Bukit Timah GRC
Muhammad Norhakim	31	Flight operations executive, SATS Ltd.	SPP	Bishan–Toa Payoh GRC
Ong Lue Ping	48	Senior Principal Clinical Psychologist, Institute of Mental Health	WP	Tampines GRC
Verina Ong	46	Lecturer, Republic Polytechnic (Business management)	NSP	Sembawang GRC
Diana Pang	51	Chairwoman, People's Association Women's Integration Network Council, and business director, Sunny Metal & Engineering	PAP	Marine Parade–Braddell Heights GRC
Pang Heng Chuan	56	Tech director and entrepreneur	RDU	Nee Soon GRC
Paris Parameswari	51	Former US Navy security administrator	WP	East Coast GRC
Lawrence Pek	55	Former Chief Executive Officer, Shenzhen Guard Technology	PSP	Chua Chu Kang GRC
Zee Phay	32	Financial planner and designer	NSP	Tampines GRC
Ben Puah	48	Contemporary artist	RDU	Jurong East–Bukit Batok GRC
Sani Ismail	49	Managing Director and legal counsel, Deesolo	PSP	West Coast–Jurong West GRC
Sarina Abu Hassan	54	Nurse, Ng Teng Fong General Hospital	PAR	Jalan Besar GRC
Nadarajan Selvamani	59	Private school director	PAR	Tanjong Pagar GRC
Sharad Kumar	25	Engineer, Applied Materials	RDU	Holland–Bukit Timah GRC
Derrick Sim	40	Deputy Director and practicing financial planner	PPP	Tampines GRC
Harpeet Singh	59	Lawyer, Audent Chambers LLC	WP	Punggol GRC
Jeffrey Siow	47	Second Permanent Secretary, Ministries of Manpower and Trade and Industry	PAP	Chua Chu Kang GRC
Soh Lian Chye	60	Senior Logistics Assistant	PAR	Tanjong Pagar GRC
Peter Soh	65	Entrepreneur, Ecogreen Technology Asia and HydroBall Technics	PPP	Tampines GRC
Sufyan Mikhail Putra	33	Former associate law director, Abdul Rahman Law Corporation	WP	East Coast GRC
Sumarleki Amjah	53	Head, Del Monte Pacific	PSP	West Coast–Jurong West GRC
Syed Harun Alhabsyi	39	Associate Consultant Psychiatrist, Institute of Mental Health, and former Nominated Member of Parliament	PAP	Nee Soon GRC
Jeremy Tan	34	Retired entrepreneur and founder, Tissue SG	Independent	Mountbatten SMC
Jimmy Tan	53	Singer and sales manager, Immanuel Engineering, former Golden Age Talentime champion	WP	Tampines GRC
Stephanie Tan	37	Homemaker and law graduate	PSP	Pioneer SMC
Thaddeus Thomas	43	Construction safety coordinator	PPP	Ang Mo Kio GRC
Thamilselvan Karuppaya	57	Self-employee	NSP	Tampines GRC
Michael Thng	37	Editor-in-chief of the Singapore Policy Journal; Principal, Boston Consulting Group	WP	Tampines GRC
Kenneth Tiong	36	Tech Director, Sensemake.ai	WP	Aljunied GRC
Emily Woo	59	Piano teacher, Yamaha Music School	RDU	Holland–Bukit Timah GRC

=== Outgoing Members of Parliament ===
The following members of parliament (MPs), all from the People's Action Party, have retired and did not seek re-election this time.

Name	Constituency (Division)	Highest attained portfolio during the 14th Parliament of Singapore	Date announced	Remarks	Ref.
Cheryl Chan	East Coast GRC (Fengshan)	Member of Parliament	21 April 2025		
Chong Kee Hiong	Bishan–Toa Payoh GRC (Bishan–Sin Ming)	Member of Parliament	18 April 2025		
Fahmi Aliman	Marine Parade GRC (Geylang Serai)	Mayor, South East District	20 April 2025	One-term PAP MP. Constituency was dissolved and become Marine Parade-Braddell Heights GRC, while retaining the division.	
Foo Mee Har	West Coast GRC (Ayer Rajah–Gek Poh)	Member of Parliament	15 April 2025	Constituency was dissolved and become West Coast–Jurong West GRC, while retaining the division.	
Gan Thiam Poh	Ang Mo Kio GRC (Fernvale)	Member of Parliament	19 April 2025	Majority of Gan's ward was carved into Jalan Kayu SMC. Also a former Pasir Ris–Punggol GRC MP from 2011 to 2015.	
Derrick Goh	Nee Soon GRC (Nee Soon Link)	Member of Parliament	19 April 2025	One-term PAP MP.	
Heng Chee How	Jalan Besar GRC (Whampoa)	Senior Minister of State, Defence	16 April 2025	First contested in 1997.	
Heng Swee Keat	East Coast GRC (Bedok)	Deputy Prime Minister / Coordinating Minister, Economic Policies	23 April 2025	Also a former Tampines GRC MP from 2011 to 2020.	
Amy Khor	Hong Kah North SMC	Senior Minister of State, Transport and Sustainability and Environment	14 April 2025	Khor's ward was redrawn into the neighbouring Chua Chu Kang and Jurong East–Bukit Batok GRCs.	
Lim Biow Chuan	Mountbatten SMC	Member of Parliament / Chairman, Marine Parade Town Council	20 April 2025		
Lim Wee Kiak	Sembawang GRC (Canberra)	Member of Parliament	13 April 2025	Also a former Nee Soon GRC MP from 2011 to 2015.	
Maliki Osman	East Coast GRC (Siglap)	Cabinet Minister, Prime Minister's Office / Second Minister, Education & Foreign Affairs	21 April 2025	Also a former Sembawang GRC MP from 2006 to 2011.	
Ng Eng Hen	Bishan–Toa Payoh GRC (Toa Payoh Central)	Cabinet Minister, Defence	18 April 2025		
Ng Ling Ling	Ang Mo Kio GRC (Jalan Kayu)	Member of Parliament	19 April 2025	One-term PAP MP. Majority of Ng's ward was carved into SMC.	
Louis Ng	Nee Soon GRC (Nee Soon East)	Member of Parliament	19 April 2025		
Sitoh Yih Pin	Potong Pasir SMC	Member of Parliament	16 April 2025	First contested in 2001.	
Carrie Tan	Nee Soon GRC (Nee Soon South)	Member of Parliament	19 April 2025	One-term PAP MP.	
Tan Wu Meng	Jurong GRC (Clementi)	Member of Parliament	14 April 2025	Constituency was dissolved and become Jurong East–Bukit Batok GRC, while retaining the division.	
Teo Chee Hean	Pasir Ris–Punggol GRC (Pasir Ris West)	Senior Minister / Coordinating Minister, National Security	23 April 2025	Constituency was dissolved and become Pasir Ris–Changi and Punggol GRCs. Also a former Marine Parade GRC MP from 1992 to 1997.	
Don Wee	Chua Chu Kang GRC (Brickland)	Member of Parliament	14 April 2025	One-term PAP MP.	

=== Party changes ===
During the period in the lead-up to the election, multiple opposition politicians changed their party affiliation for the purpose of contesting this election. The following table lists these politicians, excluding politicians whose parties joined alliances.

Name	Previous party	New party	Remarks	Constituency	Source
Michael Fang Amin	PPP	PAR	Fang contested in the 2020 general election as a candidate for PV. PV would form PAR along with PPP, DPP and RP. After the formation of PAR, Fang joined the PPP segment of the alliance as PPP's assistant secretary-general. However, after the PPP's withdrawal from PAR, Fang rejoined the PV citing disagreements with the PPP. PPP treasurer William Lim later claimed that Fang was "not a team player" and "refused to come for CEC [meetings]".	Yio Chu Kang SMC	
Lim Rui Xian	NSP	SPP	Lim was introduced as a potential NSP candidate for Tampines GRC. Weeks later, the SPP announced that he would instead be a SPP candidate for Bishan-Toa Payoh GRC.	Bishan-Toa Payoh GRC	
Han Hui Hui	Independent/No party affiliation	PAR	Han contested the 2015 general election as an independent candidate, and did not contest in 2020. However, without any prior announcement, she turned up as a PAR candidate for Tanjong Pagar GRC on Nomination Day for the 2025 general election.	Tanjong Pagar GRC	

== Pre-nomination day ==
The following is a list of events that occurred prior to Nomination Day on 23 April. All times are reflected in Singapore Standard Time (SGT). All events are in the year 2025 unless otherwise stated.

- PAP – People's Action Party
- DPP – Democratic Progressive Party
- NSP – National Solidarity Party
- PAR – People's Alliance for Reform
- PPP – People's Power Party
- PSP – Progress Singapore Party
- PV – Peoples Voice
- RDU – Red Dot United
- RP – Reform Party
- SDA – Singapore Democratic Alliance
- SDP – Singapore Democratic Party
- SPP – Singapore People's Party
- SUP – Singapore United Party
- WP – Workers' Party

Date	Party	Events	Source
24 November 2024	PAP	Senior Minister Lee Hsien Loong relinquished his post as PAP secretary-general during the party's biennial conference, while remaining a member of the party's Central Executive Committee. Prime Minister of Singapore Lawrence Wong assumed the position on 4 December, thereby completing the leadership transition from Lee to Wong which begun on 15 May 2024 where Wong assumed office.	
7 December 2024	WP	Former Aljunied GRC MP Low Thia Khiang announced his political retirement via Instagram.	
4 January	PAP; PSP	A series of altercations took place between volunteers of both parties during their separate walkabouts in Bukit Gombak. Senior Minister of State and Mayor Low Yen Ling, who was also the Chua Chu Kang GRC MP overseeing Bukit Gombak, mentioned that these two groups of volunteers met each other during their respective walkabouts prior to the incident, but her account was later disputed by PSP Treasurer Sri Nallakaruppan via a Facebook post. A police report was later lodged; to date investigations are still ongoing. Footage of the incident was later uploaded on 10 January by Azman Ibrahim, a PAP volunteer. Similarly on 8 January, PSP also released video footage of the incident when PSP chairman Tan Cheng Bock posted a video allegedly taken by a PSP volunteer in a lift. In response to the incident on 12 January, Tan reiterated the importance of a code of conduct and appropriate behaviour of both candidates and their volunteers while confirming that neither party's volunteers were physically harmed.	
22 January		The Elections Department revised the Registers of Electors, a list of eligible candidates as of 1 February. Public inspection was open from 15 to 28 February. The certification was enacted on 24 March.	
5 February	PSP	Assistant Secretary-General Ang Yong Guan announced that he would neither seek re-election in the upcoming Central Executive Committee election nor contest the upcoming election, following his non-criminal conviction of professional medical misconduct on 13 May 2024.	
14 February		Nominated MPs Raj Joshua Thomas and Syed Harun Alhabsyi resigned from Parliament, fuelling public speculation that both NMPs would contesting the upcoming election. Parliament Speaker Seah Kian Peng accepted both resignations at noon that day.	
17 February	WP	WP Secretary-general Pritam Singh was convicted of two counts of lying to a parliamentary Committee of Privileges under the Parliament (Privileges, Immunities and Powers) Act relating to former Sengkang GRC MP Raeesah Khan, and was fined $7,000 for each charge. A statement from the Elections Department later confirmed Singh's fine did not met the required disqualification threshold of at least $10,000 for at least one charge provided in the Constitution, and thus he was not barred from contesting the upcoming election. Singh has since lodged an appeal against his verdict.	
18 February		Singapore Police Force announced that they are beginning their assessment of designating physical rally sites and lunchtime rally sites in each of the constituencies. The physical rally sites would make a return after the 2015 election after it was absent in the last election owing to safety measures amidst the COVID-19 pandemic.	
23 February	PAR; PPP	People's Power Party announced their departure from People's Alliance for Reform, citing "irreconcilable strategic differences", according to PPP's secretary-general Goh Meng Seng, although PPP remained open onto further collaborations in the near future.	
25 February		Major-General David Neo was succeeded by Brigadier-General Cai Dexian as the new Chief of Army for the Singapore Armed Forces.	
11 March		The Electoral Boundaries Review Committee published a report on new electoral boundaries.	
11 March	NSP; PAR; PPP; RDU	Four parties announced their intentions to contest in their constituencies following the EBRC announcement: National Solidarity Party: Tampines GRC, Sembawang GRC, Marine Parade–Braddell Heights GRC, Jalan Besar GRC, Marsiling-Yew Tee GRC, Tampines Changkat SMC and Sembawang West SMC; People's Alliance for Reform: Tanjong Pagar GRC, Jalan Besar GRC, Jalan Kayu SMC, Mountbatten SMC, Potong Pasir SMC, Radin Mas SMC, Queenstown SMC, Kebun Baru SMC, Marymount SMC and Yio Chu Kang SMC; People's Power Party: Tampines GRC, Ang Mo Kio GRC, Nee Soon GRC, Jalan Kayu SMC and Tampines Changkat SMC; Red Dot United: Jurong East-Bukit Batok GRC, Nee Soon GRC, Tanjong Pagar GRC, Jurong Central SMC, Jalan Kayu SMC and Radin Mas SMC	
12 March	SDA	SDA chairman Desmond Lim reversed his earlier decision to step down from his leadership role, citing overwhelming support and a renewed sense of responsibility.	
13 March	SPP	SPP announced their intention to contest two constituencies: Bishan-Toa Payoh GRC and Potong Pasir SMC.	
15 March	RDU	RDU introduced Pang Heng Chuan as a potential candidate.	
16 March	PAP	Ng Chee Meng, who is also the incumbent secretary-general for National Trades Union Congress, was seen at a community event within Jalan Kayu SMC along with Senior Minister of Singapore Lee Hsien Loong, the anchor MP for the neighbouring Ang Mo Kio GRC. Ng expressed interest into contesting there on an interview on 28 March, but also told that it is the party's secretary-general Lawrence Wong's discretion to determine which candidates would contest in their respective wards.	
17 March		Deputy secretary (policy) at the Ministry of Health Jasmin Lau, and Director at the Ministry of Transport, Foo Cexiang, both announced their separate resignations from civil service, which would take effect by 1 April.	
17 March	NSP	NSP president Reno Fong and vice-president Ridzwan Mohammad confirmed their intention to run in Tampines GRC. Lim Rui Xian, Nur Farahiyah Mahfoot and Thamilselvan Karuppaya were also introduced as potential candidates in Tampines GRC. NSP secretary-general Spencer Ng also confirmed his intention to contest Sembawang GRC.	
21 March	RDU	RDU announced Kala Manickam as its groundwork leader for Jalan Kayu SMC, implying that she may be the RDU candidate there. Manickam was formerly a candidate for the PSP in 2020.	
22 March	PPP; RDU	PPP announced that it would not contest in Nee Soon GRC and backed RDU. PPP also doubled-down on its intention to contest Tampines GRC regardless of whether a three cornered fight would occur.	
23 March	SDP	SDP secretary-general Chee Soon Juan announced his candidacy for Sembawang West SMC, a newly formed constituency, following the dissolution of Bukit Batok SMC which he previously contested in 2016 and 2020. Similarly, SDP chairman Paul Tambyah also announced his candidacy for Bukit Panjang SMC, which he previously contested in 2020.	
23 March	SDA; WP	SDA announced plans to contest Pasir Ris-Changi GRC and stated that they would be in talks with the Workers' Party on Punggol GRC.	
23 March	RDU	RDU announced Emily Woo as its groundwork leader for Jurong Central SMC, implying that she may be the RDU candidate there.	
25 March		Smart Nation and AI policy director Goh Hanyan, Second Permanent Secretary for the Ministries of Manpower and Trade and Industry Jeffrey Siow, and Ministry of Finance director of security and resilience programmes Shawn Loh, announced their respective civil service resignations. These were the second wave of departures from public sector within a week since 17 March.	
26 March		CEO of the Agency for Integrated Care (AIC) Dinesh Vasu Dash announced his resignation from civil service, the sixth such departure from the public service within two weeks.	
26 March	PAP	Prime Minister Lawrence Wong spoke on an interview during his two-day stay at Vietnam, cited that the election "is about Singaporeans recognising much is at stake in this new environment", emphasizing the requirements of a mandate this election.	
26 March	PSP	PSP elects Leong Mun Wai as its new party secretary-general, replacing Hazel Poa. Both members, alongside Chairman Tan Cheng Bock, were also re-elected in the recent Central Executive Committee election held on 20 March. This was Leong's return as its party chief since he stepped down on 23 February last year due to complications over the Protection from Online Falsehoods and Manipulation Act (POFMA).	
27 March		Elections Department announced that the spending cap has raised from $4 previously up to $5 per average number of electors for the constituency, to account for inflation. The last time ELD raised the cap was in 2015. ELD also announced the minority requirements for the 18 contesting Group Representation Constituencies: Malay candidate required GRCs: Aljunied, Bishan-Toa Payoh, Chua Chu Kang, East Coast, Jalan Besar, Marine Parade-Braddell Heights, Marsiling-Yew Tee, Pasir Ris-Changi, Sembawang, Sengkang and Tampines; Indian or other candidate required GRCs: Ang Mo Kio, Holland-Bukit Timah, Jurong East-Bukit Batok, Nee Soon, Punggol, Tanjong Pagar and West Coast-Jurong West	
29 March	PAP	Health minister Ong Ye Kung, who was also the anchor minister for Sembawang GRC, announced two SME businessmen Gabriel Lam and Ng Shi Xuan as potential new candidates that might stand in his constituency.	
30 March	PAR; SPP	PAR announced that they would still contest Potong Pasir SMC, despite appealing SPP on avoiding a potential multi-cornered contest there. PAR secretary-general Lim Tean also suggested that Mahaboob Batcha may be the PAR candidate in Queenstown SMC.	
30 March	SDP	SDP announced their intention to contest Sembawang GRC and Marsiling-Yew Tee GRC.	
31 March	PAP	Home Affairs and Law Minister K. Shanmugam said during a visit to the Masjid Ahmad Ibrahim that the Constitution permitted Nominated MPs to join a political party after resigning from the position, and reiterated that NMPs are nonpartisan, just as in the case of former candidate Chia Shi Teck in 1997. In the same speech, Shanmugam acknowledged that fellow Nee Soon GRC MP and Minister of State Muhammad Faishal Ibrahim had been seen doing walkabouts at Marine Parade-Braddell Heights GRC, implying that he might contest there just as he did during his debut in 2006.	
31 March	PSP	PSP Vice-chairman Hazel Poa talked on her intention to contest in a SMC instead of West Coast-Jurong West GRC during a walkabout in Jurong West, though the party has yet to confirm where Poa would stand.	
1 April		Singapore Army Chief of Staff and brigadier general Goh Pei Ming stepped down from the armed forces, implying that he may stand in as a candidate in this election. It is the seventh such resignation from public sector prior to the election.	
1 April	PSP	PSP introduced Phang Yew Huat, S. Nallakaruppan and Wendy Low as potential candidates in Chua Chu Kang GRC.	
3 April	PAR	Former PPP assistant secretary-general and PAR assistant treasurer Michael Fang was announced as the party's candidate for Yio Chu Kang SMC.	
3 April	PPP	PPP party chairman Arbaah Haroun, Vere Nathan and PPP party chairman Derrick Sim were announced as the PPP's candidates in Tampines GRC.	
4 April	WP	Ex-IMH director Ong Lue Ping and Michael Thng were introduced as potential candidates in Punggol GRC and Tampines GRC respectively.	
4 April	PPP	PPP was the first party to release its manifesto for the election, titled "Make Singapore Home Again", emphasizing the focus of population and governance.	
5 April	PAP	Environment minister Grace Fu, who was also the MP of the soon-defunct Yuhua SMC which oversees the Jurong East-Bukit Batok GRC, announced two names, Cassandra Lee and David Hoe, as potential new candidates that might stand in her constituency, during the Jurong-Clementi Town Council 5-Year Master Plan event.	
5 April	PSP	PSP introduced Sani Ismail, Sumarleki Amjah and Stephanie Tan as potential candidates. It was unclear which constituency they would contest.	
5 April	RDU	RDU announced Ben Puah, Liyana Dhamirah and Harish Mohanadas as their team leads in Jurong East-Bukit Batok GRC, implying that they may be the RDU candidates there. RDU also announced their campaign slogan in Jurong East-Bukit Batok, "raise the standard".	
5 April	PPP	PPP's treasurer, William Lim, announced that he would lead his team onto contesting Ang Mo Kio GRC. The PPP also announced Thaddeus Thomas, Samuel Lee and Heng Zheng Dao as potential candidates.	
5 April	WP	WP's Sengkang GRC team, while unveiling their Sengkang Town Council 5-Year Master Plan event, unveiled Abdul Muhaimin, who was hinted as a potential replacement to the former MP Raeesah Khan.	
6 April	NSP	Raiyian Chia and Kevryn Lim were introduced as a potential candidates in Sembawang GRC.	
6 April	SDP	SDP announced their candidates for Sembawang GRC: SDP deputy head of policy James Gomez, party vice-chairman Bryan Lim, party treasurer Surayah Akbar, Alfred Tan and Damanhuri Abas.	
6 April	SUP	SUP announced their intention to contest Ang Mo Kio GRC.	
6 April	PSP	PSP was the second party to release their manifesto for the election, titled "Progress for All". The party also announced their intention to contest West Coast-Jurong West GRC and Chua Chu Kang GRC.	
8 April	SDP	SDP chairman Paul Tambyah reaffirmed his intention to contest Bukit Panjang SMC and said that it was "extremely unlikely" that the SDP would withdraw from contesting Sembawang West SMC and Sembawang GRC. He also said that the SDP was negotiating with other parties regarding Holland-Bukit Timah GRC.	
8 April		Toppan Next Tech, a printing vendor responsible for the print of poll cards and ballot papers, faced a ransomware attack. Election Department stated that they are monitoring the solutions closely and told that the integrity and election operations are neither affected by it, and that the voter's data have not yet been given at the time.	
9 April		Restaurant owner Chia Yun Kai announced his intention to form a new political party, the Most Valuable Party (MVP). He said the party intends to contest East Coast GRC, in a three-cornered fight against the PAP and WP.	
10 April	RDU; SDP	RDU announced their intention to contest in Holland-Bukit Timah GRC, suggesting likely withdrawal from contesting Radin Mas SMC and Tanjong Pagar GRC. Fazli Talip, Sharad Kumar and Patrick Tan were introduced as potential candidates in Holland-Bukit Timah GRC. The announcement came two days after SDP chairman Paul Tambyah said he was negotiating with other parties regarding Holland-Bukit Timah GRC.	
10 April	PPP; SUP	SUP secretary-general Andy Zhu doubled down on the party's intention to contest Ang Mo Kio GRC, claiming that he told PPP secretary-general Goh Meng Seng to "recede" from contesting the GRC to prevent a three-cornered fight, however, no deal was made between the two parties.	
11 April	PAP	Nee Soon GRC MP and Minister of State Muhammad Faishal Ibrahim announced his intention to contest Marine Parade-Braddell Heights GRC. This marks his return into contesting the then-Marine Parade GRC since his debut in 2006. Former NMP Syed Harun Alhabsyi is also spotted into this ward to serve as his replacement.	
11 April	PAP	Senior Minister Teo Chee Hean, anchor MP for the soon-defunct Pasir Ris-Punggol GRC, made a walkabout at Pulau Ubin with potential new candidate Valerie Lee, hinting that Teo could be defending Pasir Ris-Changi GRC. In the new election boundaries, this GRC takes in Pulau Ubin and certain North-Eastern Islands from East Coast GRC.	
11 April		Independent candidate Jay Ishaq Rajoo announced his intention to contest Queenstown SMC.	
12 April	PAP	Hazlina Abdul Halim was announced to be the successor to Maliki Osman's ward, confirming Halim that she would stand in East Coast GRC. Maliki however, declined to comment on whether he would be moving to another constituency or retiring from politics.	
12 April	PAP	PAP announced that their team for Marsiling-Yew Tee GRC would remain unchanged, which consist of Prime Minister and Finance Minister Lawrence Wong, Senior Minister of State Zaqy Mohamad, Mayor Alex Yam and Hany Soh. Wong also told that their party had finalised their lineup, and that 30 new PAP candidates will be introduced thereafter.	
12 April	PSP	PSP declared their intention to contest Kebun Baru, Marymount and Pioneer SMCs. The party also introduced Tony Tan Lay Thiam, who previously contested in 2011, as a potential candidate.	
12 April	RDU; TC	Red Dot United announced their departure from The Coalition, citing their concerns and risks about potential three-cornered fights.	
12 April		Independent candidate Jeremy Tan announced his intention to contest Mountbatten SMC.	
13 April	PAP	PAP announced the following candidates to contest in Workers' Party-held constituencies: Aljunied GRC: Previously contested candidate Chan Hui Yuh, and new candidates Jagathishwaran Rajo, Daniel Liu, Adrian Ang and Faisal Abdul Aziz; Hougang SMC: New candidate Marshall Lim; Sengkang GRC: former Senior Minister of State Lam Pin Min, and new candidates Elmie Nekmat, Bernadette Giam and Theodora Lai; Sembawang GRC incumbent MP Lim Wee Kiak became the first outgoing PAP MP to retire.	
13 April	SDP	SDP announced Alec Tok, former PSP candidate Gigene Wong and new candidates Jufri Salim and Ariffin Sha as their candidates for Marsiling-Yew Tee GRC. This is Tok's first time contesting under the SDP banner since 2011 (he also contested in 2020 under RDU).	
13 April	RDU	RDU announced Syed Alwi Ahmad, Pang Heng Chuan and Sharon Lin as potential candidates for Nee Soon GRC.	
13 April	PAR	PAR introduced Mohamad Hamim Aliyas and Chiu Sin Kong as potential candidates, while PAR secretary-general Lim Tean stated he may contest in either Mountbatten SMC, Potong Pasir SMC or Jalan Besar GRC.	
13 April	SDA	SDA announced that a new party would join their alliance, but did not reveal which party.	
14 April	PAP	PAP announced their teams for four constituencies: Bukit Gombak SMC: Senior minister of state, mayor and Chua Chu Kang GRC incumbent Low Yen Ling.; Chua Chu Kang GRC: Deputy Prime Minister and Trade Minister Gan Kim Yong, Zhulkarnain Abdul Rahim, and new candidates Jeffrey Siow and Choo Pei Ling. Senior Minister of State and Hong Kah North SMC MP Amy Khor and Don Wee announced their retirement from politics.; Jurong Central SMC: Incumbent Jurong GRC MP Xie Yao Quan.; Jurong East-Bukit Batok GRC: Environment Minister Grace Fu, Ministers of State Murali Pillai, Rahayu Mahzam, Lee Hong Chuang (who previously contested Hougang SMC) and new candidate David Hoe. Tan Wu Meng did not seek re-election.	
15 April		President Tharman Shanmugaratnam announced the dissolution of Parliament at 3pm, with Nomination Day on 23 April and Polling Day on 3 May.	
15 April		The Election Department announced rules to discourage negative campaigning online, including a ban on deepfake technology (such as digitally manipulated online material or advertising that misrepresent a candidate's speech or actions). This rule was instituted following a deepfake video about former President Halimah Yacob's criticism of government being surfaced online earlier that day. Certain banners, flags and posters may not be posted until start of campaigning, with some exceptions.	
15 April	PAP	PAP announced their teams for four constituencies: Bukit Panjang SMC: Incumbent MP Liang Eng Hwa.; Holland-Bukit Timah GRC: Foreign Minister Vivian Balakrishnan, Senior Minister of State Sim Ann, deputy speaker Christopher de Souza and Edward Chia.; West Coast-Jurong West GRC: National Development Minister Desmond Lee, Senior Parliament Secretary and Jurong GRC incumbent Shawn Huang, Ang Wei Neng, and new candidates Cassandra Lee and Hamid Razak. Foo Mee Har did not stand for re-election.; Pioneer SMC: Incumbent MP Patrick Tay.	
15 April	WP	WP announced their slogan for the election, "Working With Singapore", along with a video featuring the WP MPs. The party also asked for campaign donations.	
16 April	PAP	PAP announced their teams for the following constituencies: Jalan Besar GRC: Digital Development and Information Minister Josephine Teo, mayor Denise Phua, Wan Rizal and new candidate Shawn Loh. Senior Minister of State for Defence Heng Chee How did not stand for re-election.; Tampines GRC: Social and Family Minister Masagos Zulkifli, Senior Minister of State Koh Poh Koon, Senior Parliamentary Secretary Baey Yam Keng, and new candidates Charlene Chen and David Neo.; Tampines Changkat SMC: Mayor and Tampines GRC incumbent Desmond Choo.; Potong Pasir SMC: Previously contested candidate Alex Yeo (who last contested Aljunied GRC). Incumbent MP Sitoh Yih Pin announced his retirement from politics.; PAP hopeful Kawal Pal Singh announced that he would not be standing for election, citing professional and family commitments, while continuing to back the PAP.	
16 April	RDU	RDU announced their teams for the following constituencies: Jurong East-Bukit Batok GRC: Ben Puah, Harish Mohanadas, Liyana Dhamirah, Osman Sulaiman and Marcus Neo.; Jurong Central SMC: Emily Woo.	
17 April		Singapore Management University law graduate Darryl Lo announced his intention to contest Radin Mas SMC as independent.	
17 April	PSP	PSP announced two previously contested candidates for the following constituencies: Marymount SMC: Jeffrey Khoo (who previously contested West Coast GRC); Kebun Baru SMC: Tony Tan Lay Thiam (who last contested in 2011)	
17 April	PAP	PAP was the third party to release their manifesto for the election, with a slogan of "Changed world, fresh team, new resolve - securing a brighter future for you". PAP also announced that they would be fielding 32 new candidates in this election. Former NMP Raj Joshua Thomas also confirmed that he would not stand in this election.	
17 April	WP	WP was the fourth party to release their manifesto for the election, with a slogan of "Working for Singapore". WP also introduced four new candidates: Abdul Muhaimin for Sengkang GRC, Kenneth Tiong for Aljunied GRC, as well as Alia Mattar and Eileen Chong.	
17 April	SUP	SUP unveiled their five-member team to contest Ang Mo Kio GRC: Andy Zhu, party chairman Ridhuan Chandran, party treasurer Noraini Yunus, Nigel Ng and Vincent Ng.	
17 April	PAR	PAR confirmed that they would not be fielding Turritopsis Dohrnii Teo En Ming as a candidate.	
18 April		Elections Department announced that a total of 18,389 Singaporeans (out of the overall electorate of 2,758,095) were registered as overseas voters for the election, of which 8,630 voters will cast their votes in one of 10 designated overseas polling stations, while the remaining 9,759 voters will vote by post.	
18 April	PAP	PAP announced their candidates for the following constituencies: Bishan–Toa Payoh GRC: Transport Minister Chee Hong Tat, Saktiandi Supaat, and newcomers Elysa Chen and Cai Yinzhou. Defence Minister Ng Eng Hen and Chong Kee Hiong did not stand.; Marymount SMC: Minister of State for Education and Manpower and incumbent MP Gan Siow Huang.	
18 April	WP	WP unveiled four new candidates: Ong Lue Ping, Jimmy Tan, Alexis Dang and Andre Low.	
18 April	PAR	PAR introduced Mahaboob Batcha as their candidate for Queenstown SMC and Vigneswari Ramachandran as a potential candidate for Jalan Besar GRC.	
18 April	RDU	RDU announced their full team for Holland-Bukit Timah GRC: Fazli Talip (who previously contested in 2011), Patrick Tan, Sharad Kumar and Nizar Subair.	
18 April		Teo En Ming announced his intention to contest Hougang SMC as an independent candidate via Instagram.	
19 April		Elections Department, together with a joint statement with Cyber Security Agency and Ministry of Home Affairs, published a media statement to discourage any foreign interference and cybersecurity threats during the elections.	
19 April	SPP	SPP was the fifth party to release their manifesto for the election, with a slogan of "It Is Time".	
19 April	PSP	PSP announced their candidates for the following constituencies: Chua Chu Kang GRC: A’bas Kasmani, Wendy Low, S. Nallakaruppan and newcomer Lawrence Pek.; Bukit Gombak SMC: Harish Pillay	
19 April	PAP	PAP announced their candidates for the following constituencies: Ang Mo Kio GRC: Senior Minister Lee Hsien Loong, Darryl David, Nadia Ahmad Samdin, previously contested candidate Victor Lye (who previously contested Aljunied GRC in 2015 and 2020), and newcomer Jasmin Lau. Incumbent MPs Ng Ling Ling and Gan Thiam Poh announced their retirement from politics.; Kebun Baru SMC: Incumbent MP Henry Kwek; Yio Chu Kang SMC: Incumbent MP Yip Hon Weng; Jalan Kayu SMC: Ng Chee Meng, secretary-general of the National Trades Union Congress (NTUC). He had been defeated in Sengkang GRC during the 2020 general election.	
19 April	SDP	SDP reveals its campaign slogan "Thrive, not just Survive".	
19 April	WP	WP unveiled their third batch of three three new candidates: Harpreet Singh Nehal, Sufyan Mikhail Putra and Jasper Kuan.	
19 April	RDU	RDU unveiled its manifesto, with the slogan “First-class citizens, fairer Singapore”.	
20 April		Elections Departments reported that they have received a total of 245 applications of political donations (higher than 226 from the previous election), 42 applications for the Certificate of the Malay Community Committee, and 37 for the Certificate of the Indian and Other Minority Communities Committee, at the time of closing of applications.	
20 April	PSP	PSP announced their candidates for the following constituencies: West Coast–Jurong West GRC: Tan Cheng Bock, former NCMPs Hazel Poa, Leong Mun Wai, and newcomers Sumarleki Amjah, Sani Ismail.; Pioneer SMC: Newcomer Stephanie Tan; Tan told on his interview following the announcement that he will act as a mentor to a younger team who will look after the constituency if he is elected, reiterating the fact it would likely be his final election contest due to advanced age.	
20 April	PAP	PAP announced their candidates for the following constituencies: Marine Parade GRC: Manpower Minister Tan See Leng, Speaker of Parliament Seah Kian Peng, Minister of State for Home Affairs and National Development and Nee Soon GRC MP Muhammad Faishal Ibrahim, MacPherson SMC MP Tin Pei Ling, and newcomer Diana Pang. Mayor and incumbent MP Fahmi Aliman did not stand.; Mountbatten SMC: Newcomer Gho Sze Kee. Incumbent MP Lim Biow Chuan steps down.	
20 April	WP	WP unveiled their final set of three new candidates: Jackson Au, Paris Parameswari and Michael Thng.	
20 April	NSP	NSP announced that they have dropped their bids on contesting Jalan Besar, Marine Parade-Braddell Heights and Marsiling-Yew Tee GRCs, as well as Sembawang West and Tampines Changkat SMCs. NSP told on media that they will still continue to focus its contest onto their respective neighbouring GRCs. NSP also announced two new candidates: Verina Ong and Zee Phay.	
20 April	SDA	The SDA party confirms their intention to contest Pasir Ris-Changi GRC, and told that their decision on whether to contest Punggol GRC would be confirmed a day before Nomination Day.	
20 April	PAR	PAR announced two new candidates: Sarina Abu Hassan and Nadarajan Selbamani.	
20 April	RDU	RDU's secretary-general Ravi Philemon announced that he would lead his A-Team to contest Nee Soon GRC: chairman David Foo, and new candidates Pang Heng Chuan, Sharon Lin and Syed Alwi Ahmad.	
21 April		Elections Department and Singapore Police Force issued an advisory that the nine nomination centres will open early at 10am and applications will open at 11am this Wednesday. Supporters are allowed entry into venue for the first time since 2015, subject to security clearance. Drones and other aerial activities are also prohibited at said venues under the Temporary Restricted Area (TRA) boundaries imposed on a 1-kilometre radius. Hours later, ELD also announced campaigning guidelines and rules relating to online campaigning, house visits and election meetings among others; the Constituency Political Broadcast will not return this election. CNA also announced that 73 AI-generated TikTok videos were posted between April 15 (the date of issuance of writ of election) and April 19 (as compared to the 64 clips spanning from March 14 to April 14), 11 of which are digitally generated or manipulated visuals of prospective candidates, and 16 of them were videos, which were a violation of campaigning practices. MDDI also said candidates and members of the public should remain "alert and discerning consumers of information" and are closely monitored accordingly.	
21 April	PAP	PAP announced their candidates for the following constituencies: East Coast GRC: Culture, Community and Youth Minister Edwin Tong, Deputy Speaker Jessica Tan, Senior Minister of State for National Development Tan Kiat How, and new candidates Dinesh Vasu Dash and Hazlina Abdul Halim. Incumbent MPs Cheryl Chan and PMO Minister Maliki Osman announced their retirement from politics.; Nee Soon GRC: Home Affairs and Law Minister K. Shanmugam, and new candidates Syed Harun Alhabsyi, Jackson Lam, Lee Hui Ying and Goh Hanyan. Incumbent MPs Louis Ng, Carrie Tan and Derrick Goh announced their retirement from politics. The following day, Shanmugam said in a separate interview that he broke into tears after he and Lawrence Wong had unsuccessfully persuading Louis Ng step down, and that whether if he would step down will be revealed after nominations are confirmed.; Pasir Ris-Changi GRC: Minister and Tanjong Pagar GRC MP Indranee Rajah, Senior Minister of State in the Prime Minister's Office Desmond Tan, Sharael Taha, and newcomer Valerie Lee. Senior Minister Teo Chee Hean confirmed that he would not contest Pasir Ris-Changi, but did not state whether he was retiring.	
22 April	RDU	RDU announced that they have withdrew their bid onto contesting Jalan Kayu SMC and backed WP, after seeing WP walking on the grounds on that constituency.	
22 April	PPP	PPP announced that they will contest Ang Mo Kio GRC and Tampines GRC and dropped their bid from Jalan Kayu SMC and Tampines Changkat SMC.	
22 April	PAP	PAP announced their candidates for the following constituencies: Sembawang GRC: Health Minister Ong Ye Kung, incumbents Mariam Jaafar and Vikram Nair, and new candidates Gabriel Lam and Ng Shi Xuan.; Sembawang West SMC: Incumbent Sembawang GRC MP Poh Li San.	
22 April	SPP	SPP announced their candidates for the following constituencies: Bishan-Toa Payoh GRC: Former NCMP Steve Chia, Melvyn Chiu, and new candidates Muhammad Norhakim, and Lim Rui Xian; Potong Pasir SMC: Williamson Lee	

== Nomination day ==
Nomination Day was held on 23 April, and nomination centres opened from 11am to 12pm for candidates to file their nomination papers, a political donation certificate, and in the case of GRCs, at least one minority candidate and must also submit a community committee form depending on the constituency's requirements.

The election deposit for the election is S$13,500 per candidate (rounded down from MP's allowance of S$13,750; same amount as of the previous general election). (Note: The other election where the election deposit remained unchanged in between elections was 1984, at S$1,500.) As with previous elections, candidates or teams failing to secure 12.5% of the valid votes cast would result in their forfeiture of deposit. 89 new candidates were contesting in the election, of which 32 are from the ruling PAP. Twenty incumbent MPs, all from PAP, did not seek election.

Nomination centre	Participating constituencies			Constituency Principal Counting Centre
Nomination centre	Single Member	Malay-required GRC	Indian/other Minority-required GRC	Constituency Principal Counting Centre
Bendeemer Primary School	Queenstown SMC; Radin Mas SMC		Tanjong Pagar GRC	Jalan Besar GRC; Queenstown SMC; Radin Mas SMC; Tanjong Pagar GRC
Chongfu School	Sembawang West SMC	Sembawang GRC	Nee Soon GRC	Kebun Baru SMC; Nee Soon GRC; Sembawang GRC; Sembawang West SMC
Deyi Secondary School	Jalan Kayu SMC; Kebun Baru SMC; Yio Chu Kang SMC		Ang Mo Kio GRC	Aljunied GRC; Ang Mo Kio GRC; Jalan Kayu SMC; Yio Chu Kang SMC
Jurong Pioneer Junior College	Bukit Gombak SMC	Chua Chu Kang GRC; Marsiling–Yew Tee GRC		Bukit Gombak SMC; Chua Chu Kang GRC; Marsiling–Yew Tee GRC; Pioneer SMC
Kong Hwa School	Mountbatten SMC; Potong Pasir SMC	Jalan Besar GRC; Marine Parade–Braddell Heights GRC		Mountbatten SMC; Potong Pasir SMC
Methodist Girls' School	Bukit Panjang SMC; Marymount SMC	Bishan–Toa Payoh GRC	Holland–Bukit Timah GRC	Bishan–Toa Payoh GRC; Bukit Panjang SMC; Holland–Bukit Timah GRC; Marymount SMC
Nan Hua High School	Jurong Central SMC; Pioneer SMC		Jurong East–Bukit Batok GRC; West Coast–Jurong West GRC	Jurong East–Bukit Batok GRC; Jurong Central SMC; West Coast–Jurong West GRC
Poi Ching School	Hougang SMC; Tampines Changkat SMC	Aljunied GRC; Tampines GRC		East Coast GRC; Hougang SMC; Tampines GRC; Tampines Changkat SMC
Yusof Ishak Secondary School		East Coast GRC; Pasir Ris–Changi GRC; Sengkang GRC	Punggol GRC	Pasir Ris–Changi GRC; Punggol GRC; Sengkang GRC

== Pre-polling day ==
The following is a list of events that occurred from nomination day until the eve of polling day on 2 May. All times below are reflected in Singapore Standard Time (SGT). Similar to previous elections since 2011, candidates begin campaigning from the end of nominations day until two days before polling day on 1 May. The eve of polling day and after the last day for the campaigning period is cooling-off day, which prohibits campaigning with some exceptions such as party political broadcasts.

Date	Party	Events	Source
23 April		Nomination centres open to public at 10am and nomination process commenced an hour later. After nominations closed, Marine Parade-Braddell Heights GRC is the only constituency to have declared a walkover, making it the first election since 2011 to have a walkover in at least one constituency. Tampines GRC also had a four-cornered contest between WP, NSP and PPP, making it the first such fight in a general election (not counting by-elections and presidential elections) since 1997. There were 211 candidates contesting (including two independents from Mountbatten SMC and Radin Mas SMC), breaking the record for the most number of contested candidates in post-independence in the last election by 20; it also surpasses the most number of candidates since 1963 by one candidate.	
23 April		Singapore Police Force published a list of Designated Election Meeting Sites And Assembly Centres.	
23 April	PAP	PAP had changes with the last few candidates for the following constituencies: Punggol GRC: Deputy Prime Minister and Chua Chu Kang GRC MP Gan Kim Yong, Senior Minister of State Janil Puthucheary and Sun Xueling, and Yeo Wan Ling.; Queenstown SMC: Senior Parliamentary Secretary Eric Chua; Radin Mas SMC: Incumbent MP Melvin Yong.; Tanjong Pagar GRC: Education Minister Chan Chun Sing, Minister of State Alvin Tan, Joan Pereira and West Coast GRC MP Rachel Ong, and newcomer Foo Cexiang.; Marine Parade GRC MP and Manpower Minister Tan See Leng took over Gan's position at Chua Chu Kang GRC, while the roster for the latter remains the same.; In a surprise twist, both Senior Minister Teo Chee Hean and Deputy Prime Minister Heng Swee Keat were not listed into the applications, therefore confirming that both members had retired from the election; Prime Minister Lawrence Wong paid tribute to the 20 outgoing MPs. Former medalist Joseph Schooling made an appearance on supporting the PAP's East Coast GRC team.	
23 April	WP	WP announced that they fielded candidates in the following constituencies: Aljunied GRC: Opposition leader Pritam Singh, incumbents Sylvia Lim, Gerald Giam, previously contested candidate Fadli Fawzi, and newcomer Kenneth Tiong; East Coast GRC: former NCMP Yee Jenn Jong, previously contested candidate Nathaniel Koh, and newcomers Paris Parameswari, Sufyan Mikhail Putra and Jasper Kuan; Hougang SMC: incumbent MP Dennis Tan; Jalan Kayu SMC: newcomer Andre Low; Punggol GRC: newcomers Harpreet Singh Nehal, Alexis Dang, Alia Mattar, and Jackson Au; Sengkang GRC: incumbents Louis Chua, He Ting Ru, Jamus Lim and newcomer Abdul Muhaimin; Tampines GRC: Aljunied GRC MP Faisal Manap, and newcomers Jimmy Tan, Ong Lue Ping, Eileen Chong and Michael Thng; Tampines Changkat SMC: previously contested candidate Kenneth Foo; WP secretary-general Pritam Singh explained in the media that their decision to not contest Marine Parade-Braddell Heights GRC was due to resources onto contesting in familiar constituencies. Singh also explained the reason to remain in Aljunied GRC instead of contesting other areas, citing interests to outreach residents. Several opposition parties reacted negatively about that decision.	
23 April	SDA	SDA announced the withdrawal of their bid for Punggol GRC and backed WP. Their only team in SDA was Pasir Ris-Changi GRC which led by Desmond Lim. The alliance also revealed that Chia Yun Kai of MVP would join them as a candidate in Pasir Ris-Changi.	
23 April	PAR	PAR confirms the lineup for the following constituencies: Jalan Besar GRC: Hamim Aliyas, Vigneswari Ramachandran, and newcomers Chiu Shin Kong and Sarina Abu Hassan.; Potong Pasir SMC: Secretary-general Lim Tean; Queenstown SMC: newcomer Mahaboob Batcha; Radin Mas SMC: previously contested candidate Kumar Appavoo; Tanjong Pagar GRC: previously contested candidates Han Hui Hui (who last contested in 2015 as independent) and Prabu Ramachandran, and newcomers Nadarajan Selvamani, Rickson Giauw and Soh Lian Chye; Yio Chu Kang SMC: previously contested candidate Michael Fang	
24 April		Ministry of Digital Development and Information urged the public to be discerned in consumers of information and are working on countering foreign interference in elections, after reports of Antisemitism messages targeting PAP and WP from hundreds of anonymous Facebook accounts and bots were surfaced online. The following day, Infocomm Media Development Authority issued directions to Meta to block access to several instances of online election advertising from users, reminding the public to be secular, following the detaining of two Malaysian politicians and a former Internal Security Act (ISA) detainee (now an Australian) for religious posts in relation to the election.	
24 April	PAP	At their first rally, PAP minister Ong Ye Kung criticized SDP secretary-general Chee Soon Juan, with Ong stating that Chee needed to give a better explanation on why he "abandoned Bukit Batok to come to Sembawang West". Ong further added that voters in Sembawang West SMC should vote for PAP candidate Poh Li San, with Ong claiming that he could work better with her than Chee.	
24 April	WP	Pritam Singh responded the criticism from opposition parties regarding about the walkover that it was their party's enlightened self-interest. WP also told that the slate was "nothing untoward" during its planning stage. On their party's first rally later that evening, crowd control are enforced as the rally in an open field at Anchorvale Crescent were overcrowded, more than those of other parties that night.	
24 April	PSP	At the PSP's first rally, NCMP Leong Mun Wai noted instances of “poor coordination” across ministries. Leong also took aim at labour chief Ng Chee Meng, attacking the proposed acquisition of Income Insurance by German insurer Allianz. Fellow NCMP Hazel Poa claimed that the “enduring dominance” of the PAP has compromised fair political competition, criticizing the redrawing of electoral boundaries.	
24 April	SDP	At their first rally, the SDP's secretary-general Chee Soon Juan said the PAP “insisted” on increasing the GST despite the “financial hardship that Singaporeans had to endure during the COVID-19 period”. New candidate Ariffin Sha was also widely praised across social media for his oratorical capabilities.	
24 April	PPP	PPP secretary-general Goh Meng Seng criticized PPP during the party's first rally, reminding Pritam Singh to "be humble". After Martinn Ho's speech, Goh stepped up and reminded not to speak about WP nor the incident again, adding that "I'm not interested in him. I'm not gay."	
24 April	NSP	NSP chief Spencer Ng told that the opposition unity for future elections (and averting a multi-cornered contest) is "extremely difficult, or close to impossible", in response to WP's decision that caused the walkover in Marine Parade-Braddell Heights GRC, and the three-cornered contest in Sembawang GRC. NSP also pledges to be a "constructive" party.	
25 April		The first round of Party Political Broadcasts are held.	
25 April	WP	In response to PPP's Goh Meng Seng's rebuking claims of the party's decision last night on an interview, Pritam Singh responded that their decision will be intact. In another question by media, Singh brought comparisons of opposition candidates to backbenchers; he respect the outcome of voters but also urged for alternate voices and understand the differences between the two.	
25 April	SDP	In continuation of their approach from the last election, SDP's chief Chee Soon Juan, during his rally, further slams immigration topics and its defense of Chee's decision to contest Sembawang West SMC, bringing reference to Sembawang GRC PAP's candidate Ong Ye Kung's first unsuccessful candidacy in Aljunied GRC in 2011; he also further criticizes several PAP ministers sudden relocation of constituencies, calling it as "abandonment".	
26 April	PAP; NSP; PSP; SDP; WP	Several opposition parties, most notably PAP, NSP, PSP, SDP and WP, each comdemned foreign interference, in response to IMDA blocking certain websites the day before. Meanwhile, SDP's Paul Tambyah joined PSP chairman Tan Cheng Bock's 85th birthday celebrations at Teban Gardens, located in West Coast-Jurong West GRC. Fellow PSP member Hazel Poa also discussed post-election leadership plans.	
26 April	PAP; SDP	Ong Ye Kung, in his response to Chee Soon Juan's criticism of PAP's "abandonment" strategy in the last night's rally, cited that their plan was "nothing wrong", further urging voters to focus on policy ideas instead, and leave aside past topics. Similarly, Tan See Leng also claimed that he did not "abandon" Marine Parade when he reasoned his contest onto Chua Chu Kang GRC.	
26 April	PAP	Elsewhere, Culture Minister Edwin Tong urged their voters to trust "beyond mere rhetoric and soundbites", and added that there are no such "silver bullet" to the solutions in the current geopolitical climate. Education Minister and former NTUC labour chief Chan Chun Sing defended the requirements of the need of labour MPs, and told about the vulnerability of such MPs losing their elections.	
26 April	WP	Much like the first rally, their second rally at Temasek Junior College was overcrowded. Leader Pritam Singh reiterated the importance of electing their candidates by calling PAP's manifesto as "short on substance and specifics".	
26 April	PSP	At the PSP rally in Bukit Gombak, PSP candidates brought up the issues relating to the National Trades Union Congress-Allianz saga. NCMP Hazel Poa even added that "if any of [the government missteps] were to happen during the time of our first-generation leaders, heads would have rolled."	
26 April	PAR	At the PAR's first and only physical rally of the election, PAR candidates criticized government policies. Candidate for Yio Chu Kang SMC, Michael Fang, complained about cost-of-living issues and affordability. Party leader Lim Tean also stated that it was "safer" for Singaporeans to vote for PAR.	
26 April	SDP	Gigene Wong, while making her rally, blurted out keling, a hokkien racial slur, to describe her fellow Marsiling-Yew Tee GRC candidate Ariffin Sha, who also mispronounced Sha's name as an "elephant", and commented it as a "future Pritam Singh". Wong later apologized to the media on two occasions the following day.	
27 April	PAP; PAR; PSP; RDU; WP	At 8pm, the five parties attended the English political debate. In the debate, each opposition candidate, and Transport Minister Chee Hong Tat, separately warned on the uncertainties of the future of geopolitical climate, issues pertaining to immigration and job security, and the cost of living, notably the change of Goods and Services Tax and competition.	
27 April	PAP; WP	In their PAP rally, in response of the WP's claims relating to the National Trades Union Congress-Allianz deal back in October 2024 last night, chief and Jalan Kayu SMC candidate Ng Chee Meng claimed that the NTUC can do better and acknowledged about the feedback, and on the following day's rally, assured that the deal would be brokered "in good faith". Senior Minister and Ang Mo Kio GRC candidate Lee Hsien Loong separately spoke on the same rally, warned voters not to be involved in "tactical voting" by voting off the PAP with key ministers, such as in the case of Ng in the last election.	
27 April	SDP	The entire SDP made an apology to the voters after candidate Gigene Wong drew outcry for using a racial slur during last night's rally. Chief Chee Soon Juan told that he had since issued a stern warning to Wong for her misconduct, and that he and Paul Tambyah took a swift action to discipline her. According to Wong, she was unaware about the offense.	
28 April	PAP	In their lunchtime rally dubbed as "Fullerton Rally", Lawrence Wong emphasized the importance that voting for oppositions for "alternate voice" is not a "free vote", which would weaken the PAP government as sitting ministers would also be voted out and told it would be difficult to provide replacement if this happens, and that voting out about three or four ministers could seriously affect the country at this time of uncertanities. The support was backed by Indranee Rajah, added that having opposition voices in Parliament is guaranteed, reiterating oppositions selling a myth of fewer PAP MPs in Parliament. Separately, a written letter to Gan Kim Yong written by former Income Insurance CEO Tan Suee Chieh questioning about the NTUC-Allianz saga went viral on social media. Elsewhere, police are investigating about one resident of Punggol GRC whose two children under the age of 16 were allegedly involved in distributing political flyers, where its footage became viral on Reddit; minors under the age of 16 are prohibited from involvement into political activities under the current law.	
28 April	WP	Chairwoman Sylvia Lim boasted the WP slate was the "most promising" and promoted inclusion of female candidates, after seeing a record number of female candidates elected into the last parliament.	
29 April	PAP; PAR; PSP; RDU; WP	At 9pm, the five parties attended the Chinese political debate. Similar to the English roundtable forums, four candidates from four opposition parties and Senior Minister of State for Foreign Affairs and National Development Sim Ann debated on issues and matters about geopolitics, economy and jobs, and cost of living. Near towards the end of the debate, PAR candidate Michael Fang Amin asked the audience to take a bow for patriotism (though his shot of him bowing is not shown) which went viral; Fang apologized to the viewers the following day then explained that he did so in respect.	
29 April	PPP	PPP held their third rally, where candidate William Lim Lian Chin went viral for giving a speech due to his poor command of English. Lim compared the lack of LTA enforcers to "if police, do not have 24 hours service, and a thief goes into your house! And they, take all your belongings and you wait for the police to come in the morning, or, your house is in fire." This speech went viral throughout social media. Separately, PPP secretary-general Goh Meng Seng also went viral for claiming that he was "straight", repeating it three times.	
30 April	PAP; PSP	PSP's chief Leong Mun Wai told on media to ask the police to release probe findings in relation to the altercations back in January as soon as possible before polling day, citing that as a "serious allegation"; PSP also confirmed that they have yet to receive a reply from the government to look into the matter. Separately, The Online Citizen revealed a leak of WhatsApp messages from the message group TJ PAP and its community group Shawn TJ Full Heart&Volunteer Community, suggesting that grassroots advisors linked to Shawn Huang planned to disrupt a PSP walkabout on 20 April, but this was thwarted after the messages went viral online; said group and its community page were also disbanded thereafter. Huang has yet to release his statement. Separately, Leong also asked Desmond Lee to address HDB prices and lease decay, to which Lee replied that he had made assertions with "little regards" and that he did not state on housing issues during rallies.	
30 April	PAP; SDP	Holland-Bukit Timah GRC candidate Edward Chia drew outcry from social media for a rally script containing anti-SDP remark, "Farizan to shout SDP town council sucks", which was quickly removed later from social media.	
30 April	WP	WP candidate Andre Low apologized in the morning for using profane language and spreading negative remarks of complaining of several Singaporean figures and companies via a private Telegram conversation with his business school classmates, after the conversation was leaked on Reddit the day before.	
1 May		The second round of Party Political Broadcasts are held.	
1 May		Several Reddit users began to question PAP's stark disparities towards their campaigning strategies between the safe seats and those with stronger opposition challenges, with many alleging neglect and complacency in wards that held longer.	
1 May		Police are currently investigating 13 people between the ages of 13 and 20 for damaging wheelchairs at two separate polling stations, one at Sengkang earlier on Monday, and another at Boon Lay at 1am earlier that morning.	
1 May	PAP	Lawrence Wong addressed his maiden speech of his annual May Day rally, reiterating that they "confront a crisis like no other" and defended the key ministers for the election, followed by paying tribute to labour unions and workers. Labour chief Ng Chee Meng, rounding off his opening remarks about his five-year experience after losing re-election, urged voters to move on from the experience.	
1 May	PAP	A second group of WhatsApp messages from a group titled PAP Teck Ghee Branch volunteers, were leaked online, which screenshots suggesting a coordinated effort to disrupt Singapore United Party from having a walkabout in Teck Ghee (a division under Ang Mo Kio GRC, which was overseen by Senior Minister Lee Hsien Loong). Separately, Shawn Huang began to limit his social media presence following the leak of TJ PAP WhatsApp messages yesterday; Huang or PAP has yet to address the statement (for both incidents) as of now.	

=== Political debate / forum ===
Two round table live telecast debates each airing for an hour were held with a moderator on the current issues in Singapore, broadcast in English at 8 pm on Channel 5 and CNA938 on 27 April, and at 9 pm in Chinese on Channel 8 and Capital 95.8FM on 29 April. A rerun of the English broadcast was broadcast at 10am and 4pm on 28 April on CNA.

2025 Singaporean general election debates
No.	Date & Time	Broadcaster	Language	Moderator	Guests	Participants				
Key: P Present A Absent						PAP	WP	RDU	PAR	PSP
1	27 April; 8:00 p.m.	Mediacorp Channel 5 CNA938	English	Otelli Edwards	Joseph Liow; Jessica Pan; Terence Ho	P Chee Hong Tat	P Michael Thng	P Ravi Philemon	P Lim Tean	P Stephanie Tan
2	29 April; 9:00 p.m.	Mediacorp Channel 8 Capital 95.8FM	Chinese	Tung Soo Hua	Lim Yi Ming	P Sim Ann	P Eileen Chong	P Pang Heng Chuan	P Michael Fang	P Hazel Poa

=== Party political broadcasts ===
Similar to previous elections since 1980, parties who field at least six candidates for the election are eligible for participating in the party broadcast, with the allocated time depending on the number of participating candidates. The order of appearance is based on the number of candidates starting from the lowest.

Time allocated for political broadcast
Time allocated (minutes)	Participating parties							
Time allocated (minutes)	PAP	NSP	PAR	PPP	PSP	RDU	SDP	WP
Time allocated (minutes)	14	4	5	4	5	5	4	6

Channels aired on broadcast
Language	Time	Channels aired
English	8pm	Channel 5, CNA938, CLASS 95, GOLD 905
English	9pm	CNA
Chinese	8pm	Channel 8, Capital 958, 8world.com
Chinese	11.45pm	Channel U (first broadcast only)
Chinese	10pm	Channel U (second broadcast only)
Malay	8.30 pm	Suria, Warna 942
Tamil	9pm	Vasantham, Oli 968

List of candidates participating in the first broadcast (25 April)
Language	Participating parties (in order of appearance)							
Language	NSP	PPP	SDP	PAR	PSP	RDU	WP	PAP
English	Reno Fong	Vere Nathan	Alfred Tan	Lim Tean	Tan Cheng Bock	Ravi Philemon	Pritam Singh	Lawrence Wong
Chinese	Zee Phay	Goh Meng Seng	Bryan Lim	Chiu Shin Kong	Stephanie Tan	Pang Heng Chuan	Louis Chua	Chan Chun Sing
Malay	Ridzwan Mohammad	Arbaah Haroun	Jufri Salim	Sarina Abu Hassan	A'bas Kasmani	Liyana Dhamirah	Faisal Manap	Rahayu Mahzam
Tamil	Did not participate	Did not participate	Ariffin Sha	Vigneswari Ramachandran	Sri Nallakaruppan	Harish Mohanadas	Paris V. Parameswari	Hamid Razak

List of candidates participating in the second broadcast (1 May)
Language	Participating parties (in order of appearance)							
Language	NSP	PPP	SDP	PAR	PSP	RDU	WP	PAP
English	Lee Wei	Thaddeus Thomas	Paul Tambyah	Lim Tean	Leong Mun Wai	Ravi Philemon	Sylvia Lim	Lawrence Wong
Chinese	Raiyian Chia	Derrick Sim	Alec Tok	Han Hui Hui	Hazel Poa	Sharon Lin	Dennis Tan	Ong Ye Kung
Malay	Yadzeth Hairis	Arbaah Haroun	Damanhuri Abas	Sarina Abu Hassan	Sumarleki Amjah	Liyana Dhamirah	Siti Alia Rahim Mattar	Hazlina Abdul Halim
Tamil	Did not participate	Did not participate	Ariffin Sha	Mahaboob Batcha	Sri Nallakaruppan	Sharad Kumar	Paris V. Parameswari	Dinesh Vasu Dash

=== Slogans and manifestos ===
Party/coalition	English slogan	Other official languages	Refs
People's Action Party	Changed World, Fresh Team, New Resolve – Securing a Brighter Future for You	Chinese: 世界剧变，团队更新，坚持初衷，共创辉煌; Malay: Dunia Berkisar, Barisan Segar, Azam Berkobar; Tamil: மாறிவரும் உலகம், புதிய அணி, மாறாத உறுதி	
Workers' Party	Working for Singapore	Chinese: 投工人党一票，为国效劳; Malay: Bekerja Untuk Singapura; Tamil: சிங்கப்பூருக்கு உழைக்கிறோம்	
Progress Singapore Party	Progress for All	Chinese: 携手前进; Malay: Kemajuan Untuk Semua; Tamil: அனைவருக்கும் முன்னேற்றம்	
People's Power Party	Make Singapore Home Again	Chinese: 新加坡是吾家; Malay: Jadikan Singapura Rumah Semula	
Singapore Democratic Party	Thrive, Not Just Survive	Chinese: 走出平庸，迈向共荣; Malay: Berkembang Maju, Bukan Sekadar Bertahan; Tamil: செழித்து வளருங்கள், வெறுமனே வாழாதீர்கள்	
Singapore People's Party	It Is Time	Chinese: 现在是时候; Malay: Sudah Tiba Masanya; Tamil: இதுவே தகுந்த நேரம்	
Red Dot United	First-Class Citizens, Fairer Singapore	Chinese: 头等公民，更公平的新加坡; Malay: Warga Kelas Pertama, Singapura Yang Lebih Adil; Tamil: முதல்தரமான குடிமக்கள், நியாயமான சிங்கப்பூர்	
National Solidarity Party	Your Future, Our Priority – A Bright Future for Singapore	Chinese: 您的未来，我们的首要使命和任务; Malay: Masa Hadapan Anda, Keutamaan Kami; Tamil: உங்கள் எதிர்காலம், எங்கள் முன்னுரிமை	
Singapore Democratic Alliance	Make Change Happen	Chinese: 为国挺身, 一起奋进; Malay: Perubahan Di Tangan Anda; Tamil: சிங்கப்பூர் உங்களை நம்பி இருக்கிறது. மாற்றத்தைஏற்படுத்துங்கள்.	
Singapore United Party	Moving Forward, Together	Chinese: 共同前进; Malay: Maju Ke Hadapan, Bersama; Tamil: ஒன்றாக முன்னேறுவோம்	
People's Alliance for Reform	Take Back What Belongs to You	Chinese: 拿回属于你的东西; Malay: Ambil Balik Apa Yang Hak Awak; Tamil: உனக்குரியதை எடுத்துக்கொள்	
Darryl Lo	Your Voice, Our Future	Chinese: 您的心声，我们的未来; Malay: Suara Anda, Masa Depan Kita; Tamil: உங்கள் குரல், நமது எதிர்காலம்	
Jeremy Tan	Be Retired, Not Tired	Chinese: 退休，不是疲倦	

==== PAP constituency-level slogans and manifestos ====
Constituency slogans and manifestos
Constituency	English slogan	Other official languages	Refs
Aljunied GRC	It's Time	Chinese: 是时候了; Malay: Ia Masanya; Tamil: நேரம் வந்துவிட்டது	
Ang Mo Kio GRC	Securing a Brighter Future for You	Chinese: 坚持初衷，共创辉煌; Malay: Demi Masa Depan yang Lebih Cerah untuk Anda; Tamil: உங்களுக்காக மேலும் ஒளிமயமான எதிர்காலத்தை உறுதிசெய்வோம்	
Bishan–Toa Payoh GRC	A Team You Can Trust, a Brighter Future Together	Chinese: 与您同行，共创未来; Malay: Pasukan yang Boleh Anda Percayai, Masa Depan Lebih Cerah Bersama; Tamil: ஒன்றிணைந்த ஒளிமயமான எதிர்காலத்திற்கு நீங்கள் நம்பக்கூடிய அணி	
Bukit Gombak SMC	A Home We Love	Chinese: 我们的温馨家园; Malay: Kediaman yang Kita Sayangi; Tamil: நாம் விரும்பும் ஓர் இல்லம்	
Bukit Panjang SMC	Our Home, Our Future	Chinese: 我的家园，我的未来; Malay: Tempat Tinggal Kita, Masa Depan Kita; Tamil: நமது இல்லம், நமது எதிர்காலம்	
Chua Chu Kang GRC	Together a Home We Love	Chinese: 携手打造温馨家园; Malay: Bersama, Kediaman yang Kita Sayangi; Tamil: ஒன்றிணைந்து நாம் விரும்பும் ஓர் இல்லம்	
East Coast GRC	East Side, Best Side		
Holland–Bukit Timah GRC	Securing a Brighter Future for You	Chinese: 坚持初衷，共创辉煌; Malay: Demi Masa Depan yang Lebih Cerah untuk Anda; Tamil: உங்களுக்காக மேலும் ஒளிமயமான எதிர்காலத்தை உறுதிசெய்வோம்	
Hougang SMC	Your Causes, My Fight	Chinese: 您的诉求，我来争取; Malay: Kepentingan Anda, Perjuangan Saya; Tamil: உங்கள் தேவைகளுக்கு, நான் துணை நிற்பேன்	
Jalan Besar GRC	Vibrant Town. Caring Community. Strong Bonds.	Chinese: 活力市镇。关怀社区。温情你我。; Malay: Bandar Bertenaga. Komuniti Prihatin. Ikatan Kukuh.; Tamil: துடிப்பான நகரம். பரிவுமிக்க சமூகம். வலிமையான பிணைப்பு.	
Jalan Kayu SMC	For You, With You	Chinese: 同心同行，共筑美好; Malay: Untuk Anda, Bersama Anda; Tamil: உங்களுக்காக, உங்களுடன்	
Jurong Central SMC	Making Jurong Central Even Better	Chinese: 把裕廊中打造的越来越美好; Malay: Membina Jurong Central Menjadi Lebih Baik Lagi; Tamil: ஜூரோங் சென்ட்ரலை இன்னும் சிறப்பாக	
Jurong East–Bukit Batok GRC	Here for You	Chinese: 一直在您身边; Malay: Sentiasa Bersama Anda; Tamil: எப்போதும் உங்களுக்காக இங்கே	
Kebun Baru SMC	Always On Your Side	Chinese: 携手同行，始终相伴; Malay: Sentiasa Menyokong Anda; Tamil: எப்போதும் உங்கள் பக்கம்	
Marine Parade–Braddell Heights GRC	Caring For You, Stronger With You	Chinese: 永护着你，同舟共济，为你而斗; Malay: Menjagamu, Teguh Bersamamu; Tamil: உனக்கு அக்கறையுடன், உன்னுடன் வலிமையாக	
Marsiling–Yew Tee GRC	Serve You, Support You, Stand with You	Chinese: 心系于您，力助于您，携手同行; Malay: Berkhidmat untuk Anda, Menyokong Anda, Sentiasa Bersama Anda; Tamil: உங்களுக்குச் சேவை செய்வோம், ஆதரவாக இருப்போம், பக்கபலமாகத் துணைநிற்போம்	
Marymount SMC	Building Our Future, Together	Chinese: 齐心协力，共创未来; Malay: Bersama-sama Membangun Masa Depan Kita; Tamil: ஒன்றிணைந்து நமது எதிர்காலத்தை உருவாக்குவோம்	
Mountbatten SMC	Our Home | Our Hope		
Nee Soon GRC	Residents First!	Chinese: 以民为先！; Malay: Penduduk Dahulu!; Tamil: நீங்களே முக்கியம்!	
Pasir Ris–Changi GRC	Together, Forging a Brighter Tomorrow	Chinese: 携手共创更美好的明天; Malay: Bersama-sama, Menempa Hari Esok yang Lebih Cerah; Tamil: ஒன்றிணைந்து, ஒளிமயமான எதிர்காலத்தை உருவாக்குவோம்	
Pioneer SMC	Changed World, Fresh Team, New Resolve	Chinese: 世界剧变，团队更新; Malay: Dunia Berkisar, Barisan Segar, Azam Berkobar; Tamil: மாறிவரும் உலகம், புதிய அணி, மாறாத உறுதி	
Potong Pasir SMC	A Community for All Generations	Chinese: 一个三代安居的家园; Malay: Sebuah Masyarakat Bagi Semua Generasi; Tamil: அனைத்து தலைமுறைகளுக்குமான சமூகம்	
Punggol GRC	Making Punggol a Better Home for You	Chinese: 让榜鹅成为更美好的家园; Malay: Menjadikan Punggol Lebih Baik untuk Anda; Tamil: பொங்கோலை உங்களுக்கு ஒரு சிறந்த இல்லமாக உருவாக்குதல்	
Queenstown SMC	Our People, Our Future, Our Queenstown		
Radin Mas SMC	Our People, Our Future, Our Radin Mas		
Sembawang GRC	Sembawang, for Everyone	Chinese: 兴旺三巴旺; Malay: Satu Sembawang; Tamil: ஒரு செம்பவாங்	
Sembawang West SMC	Chapter 2	Chinese: 第二篇章; Malay: Bab Kedua; Tamil: அத்தியாயம் 2	
Sengkang GRC	Making Sengkang a Better Home for All	Chinese: 同心筑家共建盛港; Malay: Membina Tempat Kediaman Sengkang yang Lebih Baik untuk Semua; Tamil: செங்காங்கை அனைவருக்கும் ஒரு சிறந்த வாழ்விடமாக மாற்றுவோம்	
Tampines Changkat SMC	Hope. Action. Progress Together.	Chinese: 心怀希望。行动共进。; Malay: Harapan. Tindakan. Maju Bersama.; Tamil: நம்பிக்கை, செயல், ஒன்றுபட்டு முன்னேற்றம்.	
Tampines GRC	Model Town, Caring Community	Chinese: 模范市镇，关爱社区; Malay: Bandar Contoh, Masyarakat Penyayang; Tamil: முன்மாதிரி நகர், பரிவுகாட்டும் சமூகம்	
Tanjong Pagar GRC	Our People, Our Future, Our Tanjong Pagar		
West Coast–Jurong West GRC	Securing a Better Tomorrow, Together	Chinese: 携手共创，辉煌未来; Malay: Bersama Membina Masa Depan yang Lebih Terjamin; Tamil: ஒரு சிறந்த எதிர்காலத்தை உருவாக்க ஓன்றினைவோம்	
Yio Chu Kang GRC	For Yio, For You	Chinese: 为了杨厝港，为了你们; Malay: Untuk Yio, Untuk Anda; Tamil: இயோ சு காங், உங்களுக்காக	

=== Summary of rallies ===
==== Rally sites ====
Location type/rally color key
Lunchtime rally (held between 12pm and 2pm)	Open field (payment thru Singapore Land Authority)
School area (payment thru Ministry of Education)	Stadium (payment thru Sport Singapore)
Park area (payment thru National Parks Board)	e-Rally (held online)

Electoral division	Rally site	Assembly Centre	Counting Centre	Remarks
Aljunied GRC	Open field near Defu Avenue 1 and 10			
Aljunied GRC	Serangoon Stadium	Eastern region (Note: The SMCs of Hougang, Mountbatten and Tampines Changkat, and GRCs of Aljunied, East Coast, Jalan Besar, Marine Parade-Braddell Heights, Punggol, Pasir Ris-Changi, Sengkang and Tampines.)		
Ang Mo Kio GRC	Open field intersecting Ang Mo Kio Industrial Park 2 and Ang Mo Kio Avenue 5			Managed by JTC Corporation.
Ang Mo Kio GRC	Yio Chu Kang Stadium	Central region (Note: The SMCs of Jalan Kayu, Kebun Baru, Marymount, Potong Pasir, Queenstown, Radin Mas, Sembawang West and Yio Chu Kang, and GRCs of Ang Mo Kio, Bishan-Toa Payoh, Marsiling-Yew Tee, Nee Soon, Sembawang and Tanjong Pagar.)		
Bishan-Toa Payoh GRC	Beatty Secondary School		Yes	
Bishan-Toa Payoh GRC	Bishan Stadium	Central region		
Bukit Gombak SMC	Bukit Gombak Stadium	Western region (Note: The SMCs of Bukit Gombak, Bukit Panjang, Jurong Central and Pioneer, and GRCs of Chua Chu Kang, Holland-Bukit Timah, Jurong East-Bukit Batok and West Coast-Jurong West.)		
Bukit Panjang SMC	Beacon Primary School			
Chua Chu Kang GRC	Chua Chu Kang Secondary School		Yes	
Chua Chu Kang GRC	Hard court near Concord Primary School		Yes	
East Coast GRC	Bedok Stadium	Eastern region		
East Coast GRC	Victoria Junior College		Yes	
Holland-Bukit Timah GRC	National Junior College			
Holland-Bukit Timah GRC	School of Science and Technology, Singapore		Yes	
Hougang SMC	Anderson Serangoon Junior College			
Jalan Besar GRC	Jalan Besar Stadium	Eastern region		
Jalan Besar GRC	Northlight School		Yes	
Jalan Kayu SMC	Fern Green Primary school		Yes	
Jurong Central SMC	Jurong East Stadium	Western region		
Jurong East-Bukit Batok GRC	Bukit View Secondary School		Yes	
Jurong East-Bukit Batok GRC	Open field near Boon Lay Way			
Kebun Baru SMC	Mayflower Secondary School		Yes	
Marine Parade-Braddell Heights GRC	Manjusri Secondary School			Not used due to the constituency being uncontested.
Marine Parade-Braddell Heights GRC	Open field near Paya Lebar Link and Eunos Road 5			Not used due to the constituency being uncontested.
Marsiling-Yew Tee GRC	Choa Chu Kang Stadium	Central region		
Marsiling-Yew Tee GRC	Woodlands Stadium	Central region		
Marymount SMC	Catholic High School		Yes	
Mountbatten SMC	Home of Athletics	Eastern region		
Nee Soon GRC	Open field along Yishun Central			
Nee Soon GRC	Yishun Stadium	Central region		
Pasir Ris-Changi GRC	Meridian Secondary School		Yes	
Pasir Ris-Changi GRC	Tampines Meridian Junior College		Yes	
Pioneer SMC	Jurong West Stadium	Western region		
Potong Pasir SMC	Saint Andrew's Junior College		Yes	
Punggol GRC	Open field near Edgefield Plains Block 670			
Punggol GRC	Yusof Ishak Secondary School		Yes	Also one of the nomination centres during Nomination Day.
Queenstown SMC	Queensway Secondary School		Yes	
Radin Mas SMC	Gan Eng Seng Primary School		Yes	
Sembawang GRC	Hard court/Open field near Sun Plaza			
Sembawang GRC	Open field near Woodlands Avenue 12			
Sembawang West SMC	Evergreen Primary School		Yes	
Sengkang GRC	North Vista Secondary School		Yes	
Sengkang GRC	Open field near Anchorvale Crescent			
Tampines GRC	Open field beside Tampines Concourse Bus Interchange			
Tampines GRC	Temasek Junior College			
Tampines Changkat SMC	Open field near Tampines Street 22			
Tanjong Pagar GRC	Delta Hockey Pitch			
Tanjong Pagar GRC	MOE (Evans) Stadium	Central region		
West Coast-Jurong West GRC	Clementi Stadium	Western region		
West Coast-Jurong West GRC	Open field near West Coast Park			
Yio Chu Kang SMC	Ang Mo Kio Secondary School		Yes	
Lunchtime EM	The Lawn @ Marina Bay			Managed by Urban Redevelopment Authority.
Lunchtime EM	Promenade area besides UOB Plaza			

Date	Party/Alliance	Electoral Division	Rally site	Recap	Refs
24 April	People's Action Party	Marsiling–Yew Tee GRC	Woodlands Stadium		
24 April	People's Power Party	Tampines GRC	Temasek Junior College		
24 April	Progress Singapore Party	Marymount SMC	Catholic High School		
24 April	Singapore Democratic Party	Marsiling–Yew Tee GRC	Choa Chu Kang Stadium		
24 April	Workers' Party	Sengkang GRC	Open field along Anchorvale Crescent		
25 April	Singapore Democratic Party	Bukit Panjang SMC	Beacon Primary School		
26 April	People's Action Party	Chua Chu Kang GRC	Hard court near Concord Primary School		
26 April	People's Action Party	East Coast GRC	Bedok Stadium		
26 April	People's Action Party	Punggol GRC	Yusof Ishak Secondary School		
26 April	People's Alliance for Reform	Jalan Besar GRC	Northlight School		
26 April	People's Power Party	Ang Mo Kio GRC	Yio Chu Kang Stadium		
26 April	Progress Singapore Party	Bukit Gombak SMC	Bukit Gombak Stadium		
26 April	Red Dot United	Jurong East-Bukit Batok GRC	Bukit View Secondary School		
26 April	Singapore Democratic Party	Sembawang West SMC	Evergreen Primary School		
26 April	Workers' Party	Tampines GRC	Temasek Junior College		
27 April	People's Action Party	Jalan Kayu SMC	Fern Green Primary school		
27 April	People's Action Party	Pioneer SMC	Jurong West Stadium		
27 April	Singapore Democratic Party	Sembawang GRC	Hard court/Open field near Sun Plaza		
28 April	People's Action Party	Lunchtime election meeting	Promenade area besides UOB Plaza		
28 April	People's Action Party	Jurong Central SMC	Jurong East Stadium		
28 April	People's Action Party	Pasir Ris-Changi GRC	Tampines Meridian Junior College		
28 April	People's Action Party	Sembawang GRC	Hard court/Open field near Sun Plaza		
28 April	Singapore Democratic Party	Marsiling-Yew Tee GRC	Woodlands Stadium		
28 April	Workers' Party	Punggol GRC	Yusof Ishak Secondary School		
29 April	National Solidarity Party	Online	Facebook e-Rally		
29 April	People's Action Party	Nee Soon GRC	Yishun Stadium (Note: The rally was delayed per inclement weather conditions.)		
29 April	People's Power Party	Ang Mo Kio GRC	Yio Chu Kang Stadium		
29 April	Red Dot United	Holland-Bukit Timah GRC	School of Science and Technology, Singapore		
29 April	Singapore Democratic Alliance	Online	YouTube rally		
29 April	Singapore Democratic Party	Bukit Panjang SMC	Beacon Primary School		
29 April	Singapore Democratic Party	Lunchtime election meeting	Promenade area besides UOB Plaza		
29 April	Workers' Party	East Coast GRC	Bedok Stadium		
30 April	People's Action Party	Bishan-Toa Payoh GRC	Bishan Stadium		
30 April	People's Action Party	Bukit Panjang SMC	Beacon Primary School		
30 April	People's Action Party	Hougang SMC	Anderson Serangoon Junior College		
30 April	People's Action Party	Mountbatten SMC	Home of Athletics		
30 April	People's Action Party	Sembawang West SMC	Evergreen Primary School		
30 April	Red Dot United	Jurong East-Bukit Batok GRC	Open field at Boon Lay Way		
30 April	Singapore Democratic Alliance	Online	YouTube rally		
30 April	Singapore Democratic Party	Sembawang GRC	Hard court/Open field near Sun Plaza		
1 May	People's Action Party	Aljunied GRC	Serangoon Stadium		
1 May	People's Action Party	Potong Pasir SMC	St Andrew's Junior College		
1 May	People's Action Party	Punggol GRC	Yusof Ishak Secondary School		
1 May	People's Action Party	Sengkang GRC	North Vista Secondary School		
1 May	People's Action Party	Tampines GRC	Temasek Junior College		
1 May	People's Alliance for Reform	Online	Facebook e-Rally (Note: PAR originally planned to host a physical rally at St Andrew's Junior College but was later changed to an e-Rally per inclement weather conditions.)		
1 May	People's Power Party	Tampines GRC	Open field beside Tampines Concourse Bus Interchange		
1 May	Progress Singapore Party	Pioneer SMC	Jurong West Stadium		
1 May	Red Dot United	Nee Soon GRC	Open field along Yishun Central		
1 May	Singapore Democratic Party	Sembawang West SMC	Evergreen Primary School		
1 May	Workers' Party	Hougang SMC	Anderson Serangoon Junior College		
1 May	Independent candidate (Jeremy Tan)	Mountbatten SMC	Home of Athletics		

==== Assembly centres ====
Party/Alliance	Assembly centres				Refs
Party/Alliance	Zone 1 (Eastern Singapore)	Zone 2 (Central Singapore)	Zone 3 (Western Singapore)	Other locations	Refs
People's Action Party	Bedok Stadium	Yio Chu Kang Stadium	Bukit Gombak Stadium	Not held	
Progress Singapore Party	Not held			Bukit Timah Shopping Centre	
Singapore Democratic Party	Not held	MOE (Evans) Stadium	Not held	WCEGA Tower	
Workers' Party	Serangoon Stadium	Not held		Coffeeshop near Hougang Avenue 5	
Miscellaneous	Not held			The Projector	

== Analysis ==
After numerous minor opposition parties and alliances stake their early claims, CNA posted an article on 11 April about the implications and risks relating to multi-cornered contests as political analysts believe that some of the opposition parties staking claims to these popular sites will likely back down once the nomination day drew close. Elvin Ong, National University of Singapore political scientist, cited that about 95% of these scenarios would resolve as head-to-head fights, as such fights may benefit to the ruling party more and could dilute opposition votes. Liksewise, SMU law associate professor Eugene Tan, noticed on a trend of a higher-than-usual number of constituencies with multiple staking claims, although that the scenario was "more fragmented and more crowded" and a potential multi-cornered contest is inevitable. In the past seven general elections (and counting by-elections) since 1991 except for 2006, there were only 16 multi-cornered fights, with two involved in GRCs, and two four-cornered fights; in all of the 16 fights, there was a forfeiture of electoral deposit among the candidates with a last-place finish. By comparison, 1963 elections had multi-cornered contests in all but one of the 51 constituencies and 92 candidates had lost their deposits.
