= Sharael Taha =

Singaporean politician

The Honourable Sharael Taha
- شريلتا تاه
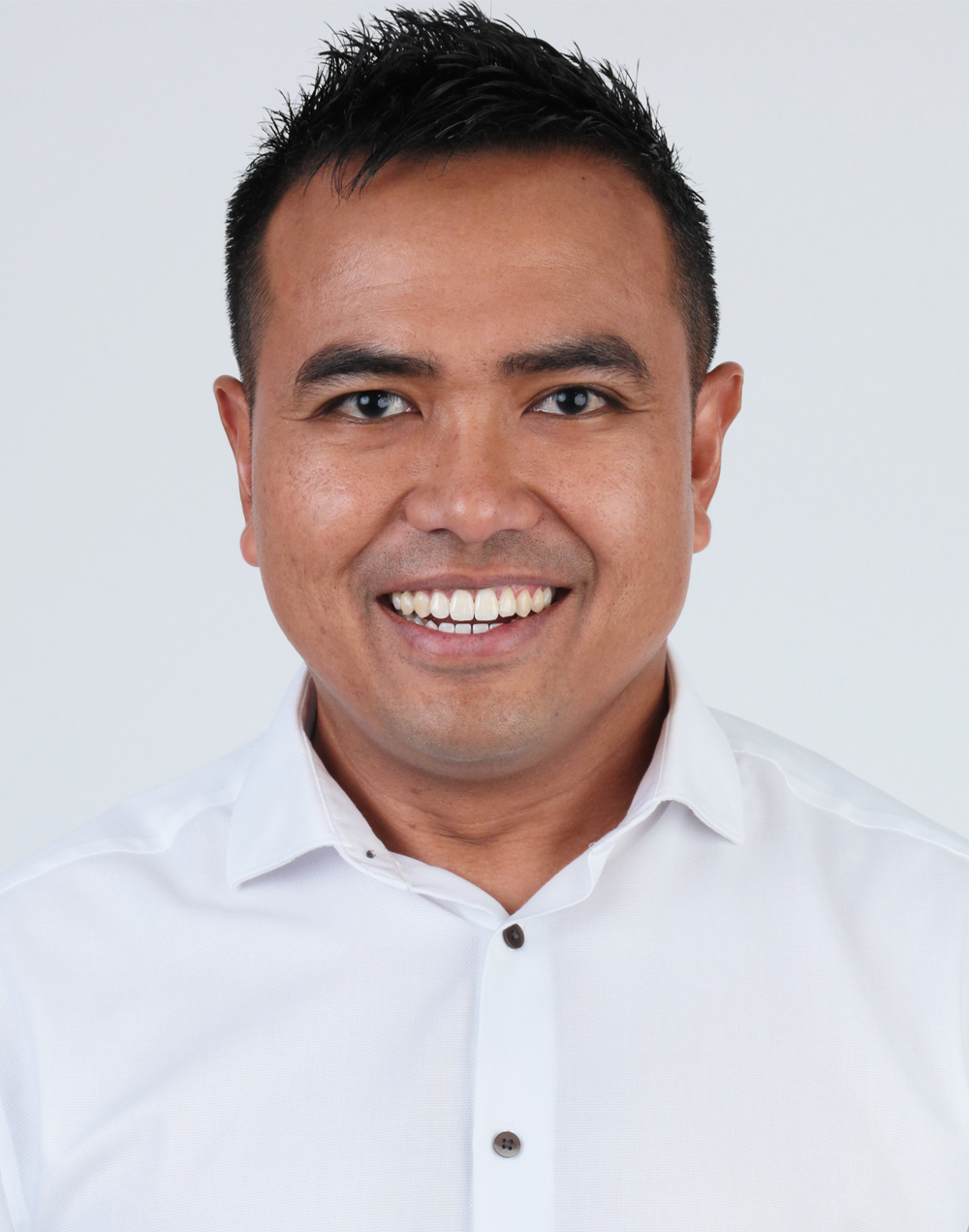
- Official portrait, 2021

Member of Parliament for Pasir Ris–Changi GRC
- Incumbent
- Assumed office 4 May 2025
- Preceded by: Constituency established
- Majority: 31,955 (35.36%)

Member of Parliament for Pasir Ris–Punggol GRC
- In office 10 July 2020 – 15 April 2025
- Preceded by: PAP held
- Succeeded by: Constituency abolished
- Majority: 63,605 (40.49%)

Personal details
- Born: Mohamed Sharael bin Mohamed Taha; 1981 (age 44–45) Singapore
- Party: People's Action Party
- Children: 3
- Education: National University of Singapore (BEng); University of Oxford (MBA)

Mohamed Sharael bin Mohamed Taha (Note: Jawi: محمد شريل بن محمد طه) (born 1981) is a Singaporean politician and engineer. A member of the governing People's Action Party (PAP), he has been the Member of Parliament (MP) representing the Pasir Ris East division of Pasir Ris–Changi Group Representation Constituency since 2025.

== Education ==
Sharael studied at Victoria School and Temasek Junior College. He graduated from the National University of Singapore with a Bachelor of Engineering degree in mechanical engineering. He subsequently went on to complete a Master of Business Administration degree at the University of Oxford.

== Career ==
Previously based in the United Kingdom, Sharael was with Rolls-Royce, managing projects in its engine assembly and test facilities across Europe. He was later seconded to Singapore Aero Engine Services.

=== Politics ===
Sharael was fielded in the 2020 general election to contest in Pasir Ris–Punggol Group Representation Constituency (GRC) on the PAP's ticket against the Peoples Voice and Singapore Democratic Alliance. His running mates were Teo Chee Hean, Janil Puthucheary, Desmond Tan, and Yeo Wan Ling. On 11 July 2020, Sharael and his team were declared elected to represent Pasir Ris–Punggol GRC in the 14th Parliament of Singapore, garnering 64.15% of the valid votes.

Sharael was appointed as Chairman of Pasir Ris—Punggol Town Council (PRPTC) from 2020 to 2025. Sharael is part of the Government Parliamentary Committee under Digital Development and Information where he serves as chairman since 2025. Sharael has served as the Chairman of the Pasir Ris—Changi Town Council since 2025.

== Notes ==
Parliament of Singapore
Preceded by Zainal bin Sapari; Teo Chee Hean; Ng Chee Meng; Teo Ser Luck; Sun Xueling; Janil Puthucheary	Member of Parliament for Pasir Ris–Punggol GRC; 2020-2025; Served alongside: Desmond Tan, Teo Chee Hean, Yeo Wan Ling, Janil Puthucheary	Constituency abolished
New constituency	Member of Parliament for Pasir Ris–Changi GRC; 2025–present Served alongside: (2025–present): Indranee Rajah, Desmond Tan, Valerie Lee	Incumbent
