= Anderson Serangoon Junior College =

Anderson Serangoon Junior College 安德逊实龙岗初级学院 Maktab Rendah Anderson Serangoon

Location
- 1033 Upper Serangoon Road; Serangoon, 534768; Singapore; 1.3788°N 103.8457°E

Information
- Type: Junior college
- Motto: Discere Servire - Non Mihi Solum (To Learn, To Serve - Not for Myself Alone)
- Established: 1984; 42 years ago (as Anderson Junior College); 1988; 38 years ago (as Serangoon Junior College); January 2019; 7 years ago (merged as Anderson Serangoon Junior College)
- Session: Single
- School code: 0715
- Principal: Heng Yew Seng
- Enrolment: Approx. 1,500
- Colour: Teal Orange
- Website: www.asrjc.moe.edu.sg

Anderson Serangoon Junior College (ASRJC) is a junior college temporarily located in Hougang, Singapore, offering a two-year pre-university course leading to the Singapore-Cambridge GCE Advanced Level examinations. ASRJC was formed after the merger of Anderson Junior College (AJC) and Serangoon Junior College (SRJC) in 2019.

ASRJC houses the Elementz Laboratory, the MOE North Zone Center of Excellence for Science, and Makers' Lab. The college hosts the annual Elementz International Science Research Conference and Exhibition, an event that accords recognition to students from secondary school (upper secondary levels) and Junior Colleges who have conducted scientific research to showcase their findings.

== History ==
On 20 April 2017, it was announced that Anderson Junior College would merge with Serangoon Junior College, with the merged school located at the current site of AJC. According to the Ministry of Education (MOE), the choice of schools to be merged are based on geographical proximity so as to maintain a good spread of schools across the country, adding that the sites for the merged schools were chosen based on accessibility to transport and quality of infrastructure.

The merged school was named as Anderson Serangoon Junior College, which is a combination of the two schools' names, from 2019. Mr Manogaran Suppiah, who had been SRJC's principal from 2015 to 2018, became the founding principal of ASRJC. The merged school received its first batch of students in 2019.

The Anderson Junior College Hostel was planned and construction commenced in 2009. The hostel was opened in 2012, but has been permanently closed since 2019 as MOE announced that demand for boarding places continue to fall and there are fewer international students in schools in Singapore.

Education Minister Ong Ye Kung announced in March 2019 that ASRJC will be rebuilt at the site of former AJC campus at Yio Chu Kang. While the rebuild is underway, the college will temporarily reoccupy the campus of former SRJC. The move was initially scheduled to take place in 2022, but due to the COVID-19 pandemic in Singapore, it was delayed twice, to 2023 and finally 2024.

== Principals ==
Name	Period Served
Mr. Manogaran Suppiah	2019–2022
Mr. Heng Yew Seng	2023–present

== Identity and culture ==
=== Motto ===
The college motto is Discere Servire – Non Mihi Solum, which is Latin for To Learn, To Serve – Not for Myself Alone. It is a combination of the previous mottos of Serangoon JC (Discere Servire) and Anderson JC (Non Mihi Solum).

=== Anthem ===
The college anthem is titled Discere Servire – Non Mihi Solum, similar to the college motto. It was personally penned by ASRJC's first principal, Mr Manogaran Suppiah.

=== House system ===
For competitive intra-school events, the school population is divided into four houses. These houses are based on classes, which are in turn based on the students' subject combinations:

House	Colour	Subject combination(s)
Artemis	Green	Combinations with H2 Physics
Helios	Red	Combinations with H2 Physics
Athena	Purple	All combinations with H2 Biology
Poseidon	Blue	All other combinations not mentioned above

A house committee is in charge of each house, with each house having a captain and vice-captain. The house committee is made up of student councillors.

== Campus ==
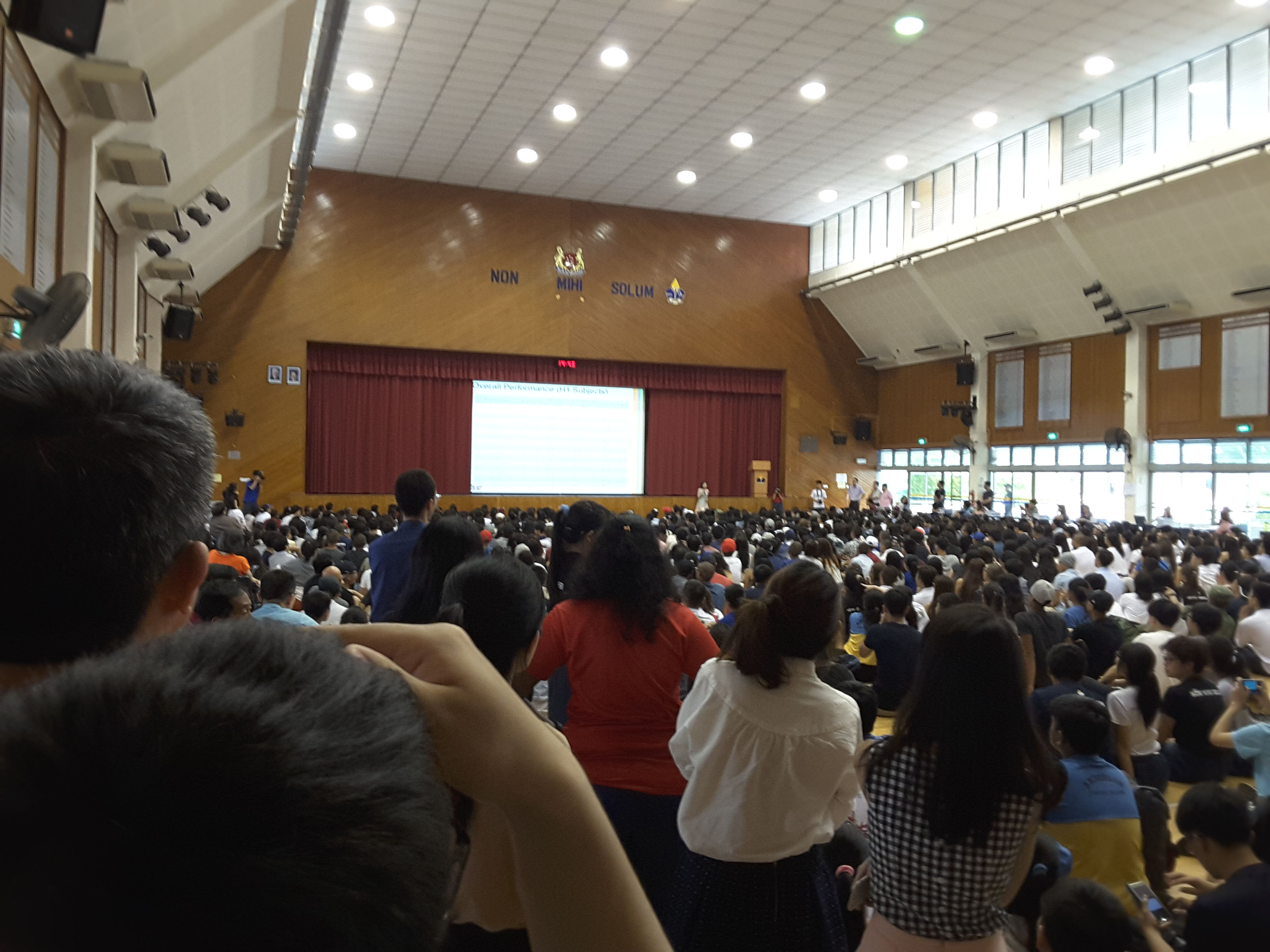
Hall of the former Anderson Junior College, at the release of results for the 2015 GCE Advanced Level examination.

Under the JC Rejuvenation Programme, the Ang Mo Kio campus will be demolished and rebuilt from 2024 to 2027. During this period, ASRJC will move temporarily to the former campus of Serangoon Junior College in Hougang. The current Anderson Serangoon Junior College campus at Upper Serangoon Road consists of 8 buildings, also known as blocks.

College facilities	Classrooms and labs	Sports facilities	Aesthetics facilities
Air-Conditioned Hall; Multi-Purpose Hall; Auditorium; Lecture Theatres; Library; Canteen; S.M.A.R.T Hub; Student Activities Corner	Air-Conditioned Classrooms; Computer Laboratories; Air-Conditioned Seminar Rooms; Humanities Room; Science Laboratories; Elementz Lab; PlayPΣn; TLEP Room	Basketball Courts; Sheltered Basketball Court; Fitness Corner; Air-Conditioned Fitness Gym; Netball Court; Soccer Field; Taekwondo Room (Formerly Air Rifle Range, armory still exists but inaccessible to students); Tennis Courts; Track	Dance Studio; Choir Room; Band Room

== Academic Information ==
Anderson Serangoon Junior College offers both Arts and Science courses that leads up to the Singapore-Cambridge GCE Advanced Level examinations. For the 2023 academic year, the college offered 147 subject combinations. Since 2020, the college is one of two junior colleges offering the Tamil Language Elective Programme (TLEP) for students who excel in the language. The programme is meant to help students pursue their passion for and interest in Tamil.

== Co-Curricular Activities (CCAs) ==
Performing Arts	Sports and Games	Clubs and Societies
Chinese Orchestra; Choir; Dance Society (Contemporary); English Drama; Guitar Ensemble; Symphonic Band	Badminton; Basketball; Football; Hockey; Netball; Shooting (Air Pistol and Rifle); Table Tennis; Taekwondo; Tennis; Touch Rugby (Girls); Ultimate Frisbee; Volleyball	Audio Visual Aid Club; Chinese LDDS; Community Champions Council; Debate and Creative Communications; Outdoor Activities Club; Photographic Society; Red Cross Youth; STEM; Strategist Society; Students’ Council; Tamil LDDS; Visual Arts Club
