= Pasir Ris–Changi Group Representation Constituency =

Electoral division in Singapore

Pasir Ris–Changi
- Group Representation constituency for the Parliament of Singapore
- Region: East Region, Singapore
- Electorate: 100,957

Current constituency
- Created: 11 March 2025; 20 months ago
- Seats: 4
- Party: People's Action Party
- Members: Desmond Tan; Indranee Rajah; Sharael Taha; Valerie Lee
- Town Council: Pasir Ris–Changi
- Created from: Pasir Ris–Punggol GRC (Pasir Ris); East Coast GRC (Flora, Loyang)

The Pasir Ris–Changi Group Representation Constituency is a four-member group representation constituency (GRC) in the eastern region of Singapore. It has four divisions: Changi, Pasir Ris Central, Pasir Ris East, and Pasir Ris West, managed by Pasir Ris–Changi Town Council. The current Members of Parliament (MPs) for the constituency are Desmond Tan,Minister in the Prime Minister's Office, Second Minister for Finance and Second Minister for National Development Indranee Rajah, Sharael Taha and Valerie Lee from the governing People's Action Party (PAP).

== History ==
Before the 2025 general election, Pasir Ris–Changi GRC was formed with four MPs by merging the Pasir Ris section of the abolished Pasir Ris–Punggol GRC with the estates of Loyang and Flora in East Coast GRC. At the same time, the Punggol section of Pasir Ris–Punggol GRC was merged with Punggol West Single Member Constituency (SMC) to form a new Punggol GRC. The Electoral Boundaries Review Committee (EBRC) claimed that the move was meant to emphasise the identity of Punggol.

On 21 April, the PAP announced that Indranee Rajah would leave Tanjong Pagar GRC to lead a PAP team in Pasir Ris–Changi GRC. On 23 April, Desmond Lim, chairperson of the Singapore Democratic Alliance (SDA), announced an opposing team led by him. The PAP won 67.68% of the vote.

== Members of Parliament ==
Divisions or wards of Pasir Ris–Changi GRC as of the 2025 general election:
1 Changi (includes the North-Eastern Islands)
2 Pasir Ris Central
3 Pasir Ris East
4 Pasir Ris West

Year	Division	Members of Parliament	Party
Formation
2025	Changi; Pasir Ris Central; Pasir Ris East; Pasir Ris West	Valerie Lee; Desmond Tan; Sharael Taha; Indranee Rajah	PAP

== Electoral results ==
Note: The Elections Department does not include rejected votes when calculating the vote shares of candidates. Hence, all candidates' vote shares will total to 100% at any given election (may not appear so in multi-way contests due to rounding).

=== Elections in 2020s ===
General Election 2025
Party	Candidate	Votes	%
PAP	Desmond Tan Indranee Rajah Sharael Taha Valerie Lee	61,168	67.68
SDA	Desmond Lim Abu Mohamed Harminder Pal Singh Chia Yun Kai	29,213	32.32
Majority		31,955	35.36
Total valid votes		90,381	97.32
Rejected ballots		2,491	2.68
Turnout		92,872	91.99
Registered electors		100,957	
PAP win (new seat)			

== See also ==
- East Coast Group Representation Constituency
