= Valerie Lee =

Singaporean politician

The Honourable Valerie Lee PBM
- 李乃怡

Member of the Singapore Parliament for Pasir Ris–Changi GRC
- Incumbent
- Assumed office 4 May 2025
- Preceded by: Constituency established
- Majority: 31,955 (35.36%)

Personal details
- Born: Valerie Lee Nai Yi; 1985 or 1986 (age 40) Singapore
- Party: People's Action Party
- Education: Duke University; University of Michigan
- Occupation: Politician; business executive

Valerie Lee Nai Yi (Note: Chinese: 李乃怡; pinyin: Lǐ Nǎiyí) PBM (born February 1986) is a Singaporean business executive and politician. A member of the governing People's Action Party (PAP), she has been the Member of Parliament (MP) for the Changi division of Pasir Ris–Changi Group Representation Constituency (GRC) since 2025.

== Education ==
Lee graduated from the University of Michigan with a Bachelor of Chemical Engineering in 2008. In 2009, she graduated from Duke University with a Master of Engineering Management.

== Career ==
Lee is the head of corporate affairs and sustainability at Sembcorp. She had previously been a director at SP Group and Singtel.

=== Political career ===
Lee began volunteering for the PAP in 2017. In 2023, she was the chairperson of The Frontier Community Club Management Committee; for this, she was awarded the Pingat Bakti Masyarakat (PBM) (Note: Malay for Public Service Medal.) in the same year's National Day Awards.

In October 2024, Lee was seen volunteering in West Coast GRC. At the time, she had been a councillor for West Coast Town Council since August of the same year and volunteered in the constituency for approximately a year after leaving Pioneer Single Member Constituency (SMC). In December, she was seen on PAP walkabouts in West Coast GRC.

In late March 2025, Lee was seen with four of the incumbent MPs for the five-member Pasir Ris–Punggol GRC, which had been abolished for the general election in the same year at the recommendation of the Electoral Boundaries Review Committee (EBRC). On Nomination Day, 23 April, she was nominated to be part of the PAP team for the four-member Pasir Ris–Changi GRC, created from the abolition of Pasir Ris–Punggol GRC.

Lee became an MP after the PAP team for Pasir Ris–Changi GRC defeated the Singapore Democratic Alliance (SDA) with 67.68% of the vote. Lee has served as the Vice-Chairman of the Pasir Ris—Changi Town Council since 2025.

== Personal life ==
Lee is proficient in English and Mandarin, and can speak basic Malay, Teochew and Hokkien. She has a family and previously enjoyed hiking and cooking outside of work.

== Notes ==
Parliament of Singapore
New constituency	Member of Parliament for Pasir Ris–Changi GRC; 2025–present Served alongside: Indranee Rajah, Desmond Tan, Sharael Taha	Incumbent
