= NorthLight School =

Singaporean government-run special school

Location
- 151 Towner Road, Singapore 327830
- Coordinates: 1.3199647°N 103.8534703°E

Information
- Type: Government
- Motto: A Living And Learning Community
- Founded: January 2007; 19 years ago
- Principal: Mdm Sung Mee Har
- Gender: Coeducational
- Age range: 13-18
- Enrolment: 850 (2015)
- Website: www.nls.edu.sg

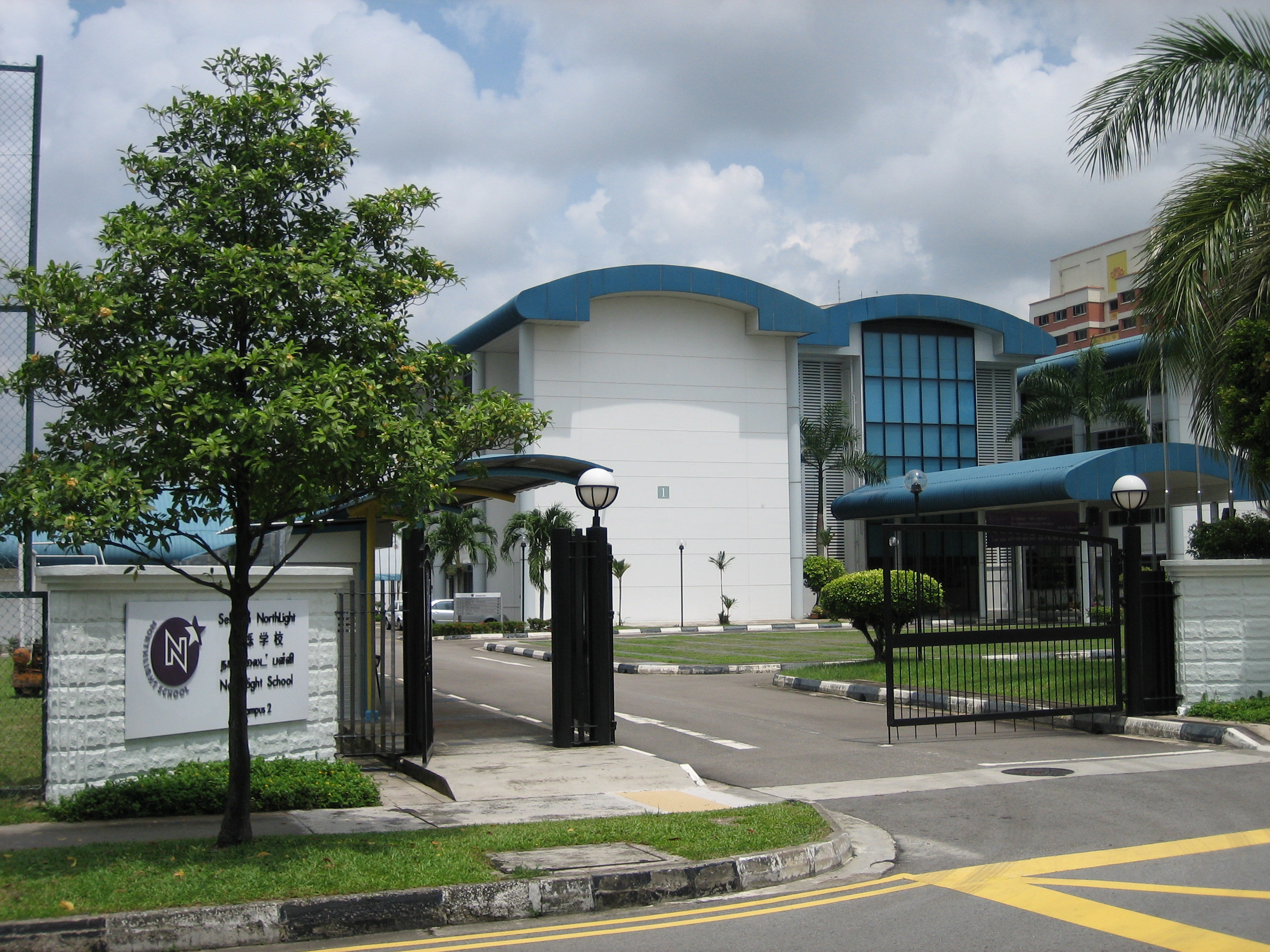
Northlight School Campus 2 front

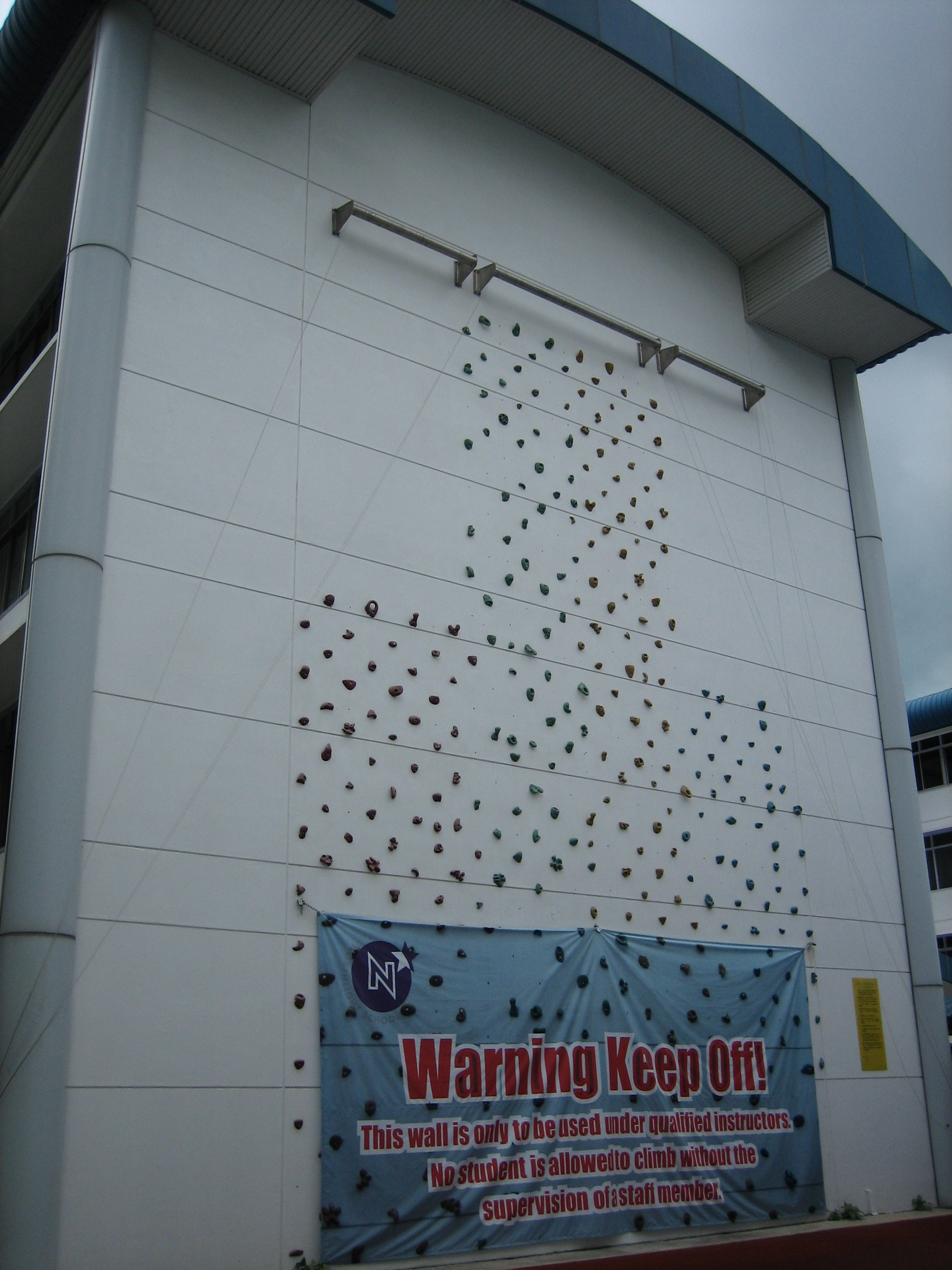
Rock climbing wall at Campus 2

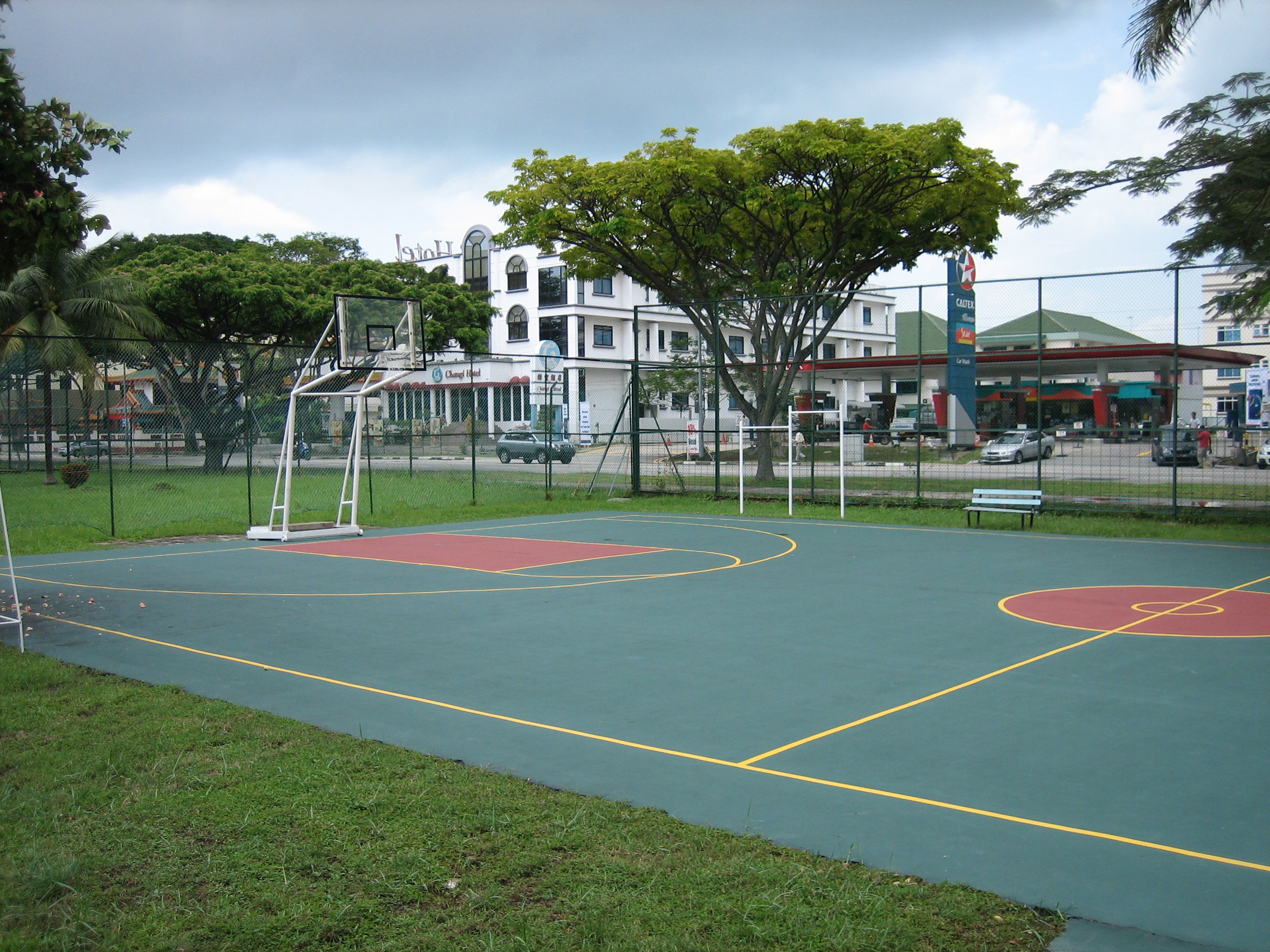
Basketball court at Campus 2

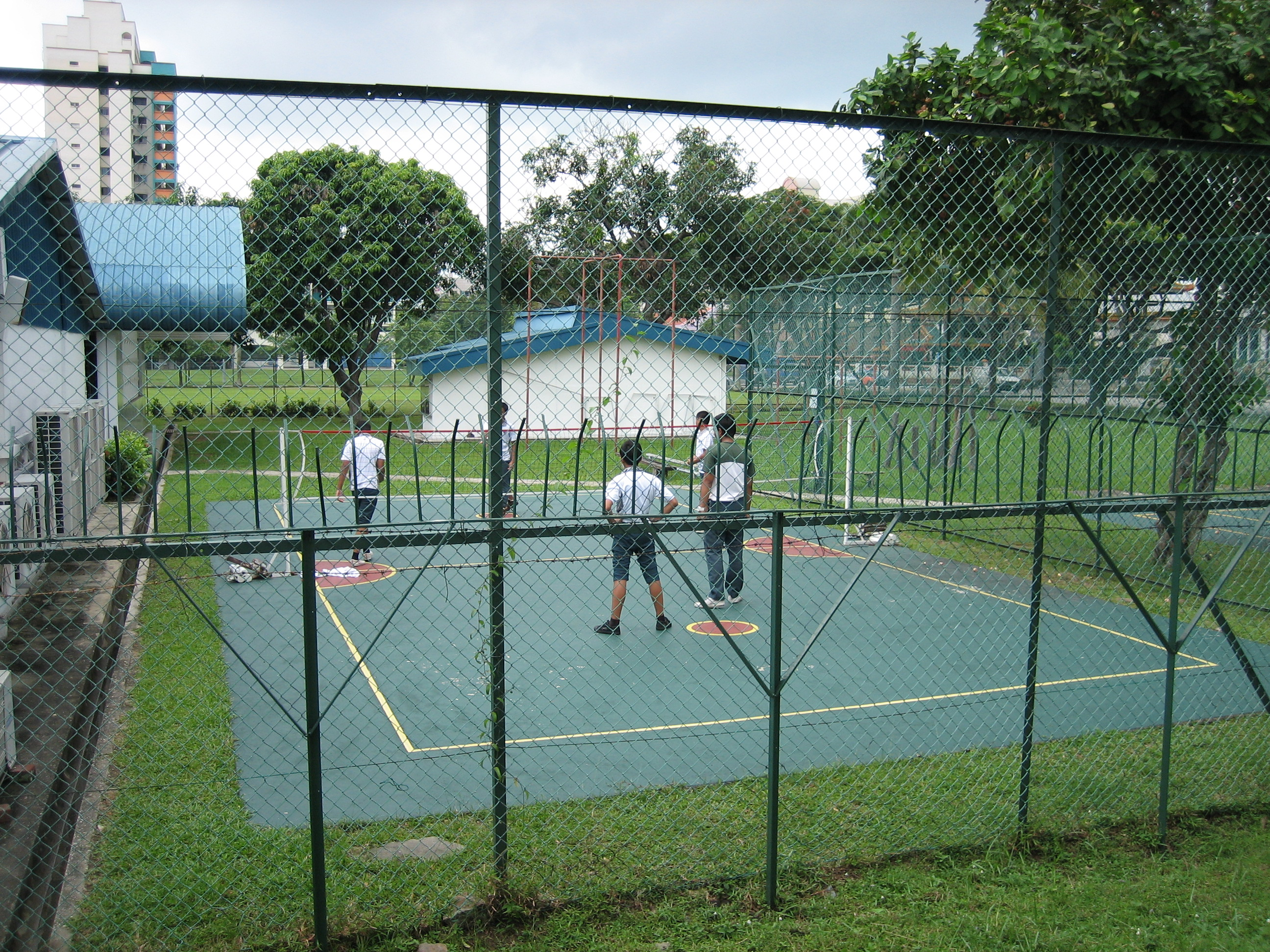
A game of Sepak Takraw on the court at campus 2

Northlight School (Chinese: 北烁学校) is a school located along Towner Road, in Kallang, Singapore. It was established by the Ministry of Education (MOE) for students with difficulties handling the mainstream curriculum in the country. The school started its operations formally in January 2007 to assist students at risk of dropping out of school. The school admits students who have attempted and failed the Primary School Leaving Examination (PSLE) at least once. The school also accepts those who have yet to complete secondary education.

== History ==
NorthLight School was established in March 2006 and opened to students the following year. Previously, students who failed the PSLE would enter technical schools, later called Vocational Training Centres (VTCs), for secondary education. However, the attrition was alarmingly high. In 2005, the drop-out rate was 60% and only half of the remaining 40% entered Institute of Technical Education (ITE). Because the minimum entry age for VTCs was fourteen, there was a two-year lag between the primary and secondary stages. In response to the problem, the Ministry of Education proposed to open a school to meet the needs of these students who would otherwise be forced to leave school. The Geylang Serai Vocation Training Centre was absorbed into NorthLight.

Chua Yen Ching was the founding principal. She stepped down in 2011 and was succeeded by Martin Tan.

== Campus ==
Northlight had two former campuses situated in Singapore: Campus 1 at Dunman Road and Campus 2 at Jalan Ubi. The two campuses differ mainly in the curricula offered: Campus 1 provides the three-year enhanced vocational programme while Campus 2 provides the existing two-year program Institute of Technical Education Skills Certificate (ISC) Course.

The current campus is located at 151 Towner Road, in Kallang. Previously, the Balestier branch of the Institute of Technical Education (ITE) was based at the Kallang campus.

Before NorthLight School moved to its current location in Kallang in 2015, it was situated on Dunman Road in Geylang.

== Curriculum ==
The vocational curriculum focuses on socio-emotional development and life-skills training. The curriculum includes a wide range of vocational options.The program includes an eight-week industrial attachment intended to provide workplace experience. There is a Co-Curricular Activity (CCA) programme to cater to the needs of students beyond the academics. The school employs full-time counsellors to provide student support services.
