= Bukit View Secondary School =

Location
- 16 Bukit Batok Street 21, Singapore 659633
- 1.345841°N 103.752631°E

Information
- Type: Government, Co-ed
- Established: 3 January 1986; 40 years ago
- Session: Single
- School code: 3040
- Principal: Mr Jaswant Singh
- Enrolment: Approx. 1,000
- Color: Green Yellow Blue
- Website: Bukit View Secondary School

Bukit View Secondary School (BTVSS) is a co-educational government secondary school in Bukit Batok, Singapore.

== History ==
The building of the school began on 30 September 1984 and was completed on 29 December 1985. It started classes with 450 students in the Secondary One and Two levels and 15 teachers on 3 January 1986, headed by the school's first principal, Ow Chiong Hoo. In the same year, the school saw the first Investiture of the BTVSS Student Council, the formation of the school's military band and the library. The school was fully functional with the completion of the outdoor fitness stations and the landscaped garden. In 1987, BVSS held its first track-and-field meet, and also was the convenor of the West Zone Secondary Schools Badminton Tournament. The school facility also installed an electric kiln installed for students to explore their artistic talents through pottery. On 15 July 1988, BVSS was officially opened by Chai Chong Yii, Member of Parliament for Bukit Batok. A school lecture hall was built and officially opened by Ong Chit Chung, Member of Parliament for Bukit Batok, on 6 November 1989. In 1997 BVSS also participated in the two-day Pesta Sukan National 10's Rugby Tournament for the first time.

On 13 November 1999, BVSS, along with seven other schools and the National Institute of Education, adopted the two-hectare Mandai Forest near Upper Seletar Reservoir to help restore the forest patch that was devastated by invasion of the Smilax-variable creeper plant on its grounds, over the years. The adoption project also planned to use forest habitat restoration to facilitate hands-on learning of forest ecology and biodiversity and equip students and teachers with field-based learning strategies. It was also an opportunity for students from different schools to collaborate on a project that is both about learning and saving the natural environment.

A student team led by Maziyan Abdullah participated in the 2008 World Media Masters on 28 March 2008, organised by IT Leisure and Education and supported by Creative Community Singapore, an initiative of the Ministry of Information, Communication and the Arts. The team, along with those from 15 other schools participating in the programme, had been provided with professional training on producing computer games since August 2007, enabling them to experience real-life computer game production work and a chance for the selected winning team to market their game product commercially international.

=== Host of important events ===
BVSS played host to a number of educational activities for their educational zone. In 1987, the school organised the first Annual West Zone Inter-Primary Schools Languages, Maths & Science competitions. The school was also the host for the finals of the inaugural Primary Inter-School Chinese Debate between Pei Chun Public School and CHIJ on 23 June 1990. The debate, organised by BVSS principal Ow Chiong Hoo, saw CHIJ emerging as winners for the first of the biannual competition.

Between the years 1989 and 1991, the school hall was the venue of choice for important speeches delivered by VIPs from various social levels. They were organised by the Bukit Batok Community Centre Current Affairs Club, and chaired by Ong Chit Chung, Member of Parliament for Bukit Batok. Members of the public heard S. Vasoo, Member of Parliament for Tiong Bahru, delivering his thoughts on having a social network to help the needy, in his speech titled "Perspectives on the lower-income group" on 23 October 1990. On 23 August 1991 a speech on China's foreign policy was delivered by Zhang Qing, China's Ambassador to Singapore. Singapore's Ambassador to the United States Chan Heng Chee also co-chaired a public forum titled "The Challenges of Democracy" on 12 November 1991.

=== Redevelopment of campus ===
The Ministry of Education launched PRIME on 11 May 1999 to upgrade or rebuild about 290 schools built over the last 20 to 30 years, and as part of the Ministry's "Thinking Schools, Learning Nation" vision ensuring all schools have a conducive physical environment to enhance teaching and learning. Schools constructed before 1997 are upgraded with the construction of extension blocks and alteration of existing school buildings, or rebuilding that involves the construction of new buildings either on existing site or on available vacant sites. The project was implemented over a period of seven years from 1999 to 2005, in three phases with an estimated cost of S$4.46 billion.

BVSS's upgrading programme took place in June 2005, in Phase 6 of the PRIME project. This upgrading consisted of the building of the New Block housing the new library, professional sharing room and computer labs. The Old Block and School Hall/Canteen were being refurbished. The Technical Block was expanded to include Chemistry, Biology and Physics Labs, F&N department and the Design & Technology (D&T) Department by December 2006. The upgrading of the main school area was completed by May 2008, and seeing through the completion of the school field and a new indoor sports hall.

== Achievements ==
In 1989, the school won Best Award and prize money of $3,000 in the 1989 National Mural Competition, an event held in conjunction with the Community Week '89 themed at social cohesion and racial harmony.

A micromouse entry from Bukit View Secondary School, along with entries from Catholic Junior College and St. Joseph's Institution, was named overall winners for their shortest timings and intelligent maze-escaping strategies, in the fourth Singapore Inter-school Micromouse Competition held at Ngee Ann Polytechnic on 9 April 1994.

BVSS also made it as one of the ten finalists in the 2nd National Schools Newspaper Competition organised by The Straits Times. The school's team also came in 2nd place in the Gears Of War (GOW) tournament at the Interschool eGaming Challenge organized and held at Funan DigitaLife Mall in March 2007.

The school's principal, Vasuthevan K. Ramamurthy, was awarded the Public Administration Medal (Bronze) at the National Day Awards in 2016.

=== Young Designers' Award ===
BVSS culture encourages art and design with its students. This culture resulted in a total of 19 awards for their innovate designs, in the 12 years' of the Young Designers Award. In the years 1997 - 2000 alone, the school produced seven winners consecutively in the competition.
