= Desmond Tan (politician) =

Singaporean politician (born 1970)

The Honourable Desmond Tan
- 陈国明
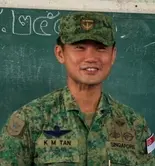
- Tan in 2014

Deputy Secretary-General of the National Trades Union Congress
- Incumbent
- Assumed office 30 June 2022 Serving with Heng Chee How
- Secretary-General: Ng Chee Meng
- Preceded by: Chee Hong Tat

Assistant Organising Secretaries of the People's Action Party
- Incumbent
- Assumed office 26 November 2022 Serving with Alex Yam & Dinesh Vasu Dash
- Prime Minister: Lawrence Wong

Member of Parliament for Pasir Ris–Changi GRC
- Incumbent
- Assumed office 4 May 2025
- Preceded by: Constituency established
- Majority: 31,955 (35.36%)

Member of Parliament for Pasir Ris–Punggol GRC
- In office 10 July 2020 – 15 April 2025
- Preceded by: PAP held
- Succeeded by: Constituency abolished
- Majority: 44,466 (28.30%)

Personal details
- Born: Desmond Tan Kok Ming; 13 September 1970 (age 56) Singapore
- Party: People's Action Party
- Children: 3
- Education: University of Manchester (BEng); King's College London (MA); Nanyang Technological University (MBA)
- Awards: SAF Overseas Medal (Enhanced); NATO (ISAF) Medal

Military service
- Branch/service: Singapore Army
- Years of service: 1988–2016
- Rank: Brigadier-General
- Commands: Chief of Staff – General Staff; Director of Joint Operations; National Contingent Commander; Chief Guards Officer; Director of Public Affairs
- Battles/wars: War in Afghanistan; International Security Assistance Force

Desmond Tan Kok Ming (Note: Chinese: 陈国明; Peng'im: Dang^{5} Gog^{4} Ming^{5}) (born 13 September 1970) is a Singaporean politician, union leader and former military officer. A member of the governing People's Action Party (PAP), he was the Member of Parliament (MP) representing the Pasir Ris–Punggol Group Representation Constituency (GRC) between 2020 and 2025 and the MP representing the Pasir Ris–Changi Group Representation Constituency since 2025. Tan was the Minister of State for Home Affairs and Minister of State for Sustainability and the Environment concurrently between 2020 and 2022. and now the Senior Minister of State in the Prime Minister's Office since 2024. He is also the Deputy Secretary-General of the National Trades Union Congress since 2022.

Prior to entering politics, Tan had served 28 years in the Singapore Army under the Singapore Armed Forces (SAF) and attained the rank Brigadier-General. He left the SAF in 2017. He was chief executive director of the People's Association from 2017 to 2020. Tan made his political debut in the 2020 general election when he joined a five-member PAP team contesting in Pasir Ris–Punggol GRC, which they won with 64.15% of the vote.

== Early life and education ==
Tan grew up with his three siblings living in a three-room HDB flat in Bukit Ho Swee where his father worked as a taxi driver while his mother takes up odd jobs.

Tan attended Queenstown Secondary Technical School and Raffles Junior College before graduating from the University of Manchester with a Bachelor of Engineering degree with honours in aeronautical engineering in 1994 under the Singapore Armed Forces Merit Scholarship. He also completed a master's degree in defence strategic studies at King's College London in 2000 and a Master of Business Administration at Nanyang Technological University.

== Career ==
=== Military career ===
Tan started his career in the Singapore Armed Forces and spent 28 years in the military rising to the rank of Brigadier-General. He held various appointments, including Chief of Staff – General Staff, Director of Joint Operations, Chief Guards Officer, and Director of Public Affairs. He was also Chairman of the NDP 2012 Executive Committee, and had participated in the International Security Assistance Force in Afghanistan as Singapore's contingent commander. He received the SAF Overseas Medal (Enhanced) and NATO (ISAF) Medal.

=== Civil career ===
After retiring from the Singapore Armed Forces in 2017, Tan joined the People's Association as its chief executive director before stepping down in June 2020 to run for election in the 2020 general election.

=== Political career ===
Tan made his political debut in the 2020 general election when he joined a five-member People's Action Party (PAP) team contesting in Pasir Ris–Punggol GRC. The PAP team won with 64.15% of the vote against the Singapore Democratic Alliance and Peoples Voice, and Tan was elected as the Member of Parliament representing the Pasir Ris Central ward of Pasir Ris–Punggol GRC.

On 27 July 2020, he was appointed Minister of State for Home Affairs and Minister of State for Sustainability and the Environment.

In June 2022, a cabinet reshuffle by Prime Minister Lee Hsien Loong led to Tan relinquishing his positions of Minister of State for Home Affairs and Minister of State for Sustainability and the Environment while assuming the position of Minister of State in the Prime Minister's Office and joining the National Trades Union Congress (NTUC) as Deputy Secretary-General. This would replace the existing NTUC Deputy Secretary-General Chee Hong Tat, who would leave NTUC to return to the government on a full-time basis. This move was described as allowing Tan to focus his time on his duties for the NTUC. In May 2024, Tan was promoted to Senior Minister of State in the Prime Minister's Office while continuing his stint in NTUC.

In the 2025 general election, Tan joined the newly-created four-member Pasir Ris–Changi GRC. The PAP team won with 67.68% of the vote against the Singapore Democratic Alliance and Tan was elected as the Member of Parliament representing the Pasir Ris Central ward of Pasir Ris–Changi GRC. Tan has served as the Vice-Chairman of the Pasir Ris—Changi Town Council since 2025.

== Controversies ==
In January 2025, Tan faced backlash over his listening ear in a ST podcast in which his remarks about often being a ‘listening ear’ rather than solving problems during Meet-the-People Sessions (MPS) have drawn public criticism.

== Personal life ==
Tan is married with three children.

== Notes ==
Parliament of Singapore
Preceded by Zainal bin Sapari; Teo Chee Hean; Ng Chee Meng; Teo Ser Luck; Sun Xueling; Janil Puthucheary	Member of Parliament for Pasir Ris–Punggol GRC; 2020–2025; Served alongside: Sharael Taha, Teo Chee Hean, Yeo Wan Ling, Janil Puthucheary	Constituency abolished
New constituency	Member of Parliament for Pasir Ris–Changi GRC; 2025–present Served alongside: (2025–present): Indranee Rajah, Sharael Taha, Valerie Lee	Incumbent
