= Matilda House =

Coordinates: 1°24′18.5″N 103°53′55.5″E

- Location within Singapore

General information
- Status: Private
- Type: Bungalow
- Architectural style: Colonial
- Location: 78 Punggol Walk, Singapore 822271, Punggol, Singapore
- Named for: Josephine Matilda Cashin
- Construction started: 1902; 124 years ago
- Completed: 1902; 124 years ago
- Renovated: 2015; 11 years ago
- Owner: Sim Lian Group; Joseph Cashin (former); Howard Cashin (former); Alexander Cashin (former)
- Landlord: Urban Redevelopment Authority; Joseph Cashin (former); Howard Cashin (former); Alexander Cashin (former)

Technical details
- Floor count: 1
- Floor area: 4,488 square feet (416.9 m^{2})

Other information
- Number of rooms: 6

Matilda House, located at Punggol Walk in Punggol, Singapore, is one of the oldest houses in Singapore. It is currently part of a new residential condominium complex, "A Treasure Trove", which was completed in 2015. The façade and interior are restored and has been converted into a clubhouse.

Built in 1902, it originally belonged to Alexander Cashin, whose family history in Singapore can be traced back to the early 1840s. It has entrances on two sides of the main building, an open balcony at the front façade, and a long verandah. It was conserved by Singapore's Urban Redevelopment Authority in February 2000.

== History ==
Matilda House before government acquisition

=== Background ===
The house was completed in 1902 and was built by Alexander Cashin for his wife. The house was named after Alexander's mother, Josephine Matilda Cashin, and hence the name, "Matilda House". It was a single-storey tropical-style bungalow with four bedrooms and servant-quarters attached. The house was set within a large garden with coconut and various kinds of fruit trees and also includes a horse-stable, tennis-courts and is nearby a small fishing village on the side close to the seafront. It mainly served as a weekend retreat for the Cashins.

The ownership of the house was later passed on to Howard Cashin, where he resided in together with his wife and children after returning from England where he studied law in 1953. In the 1960s, the ownership was then further passed on to his brother, Joseph Cashin, where Joseph lived in along with his sister and their mother.

=== Government acquisition ===
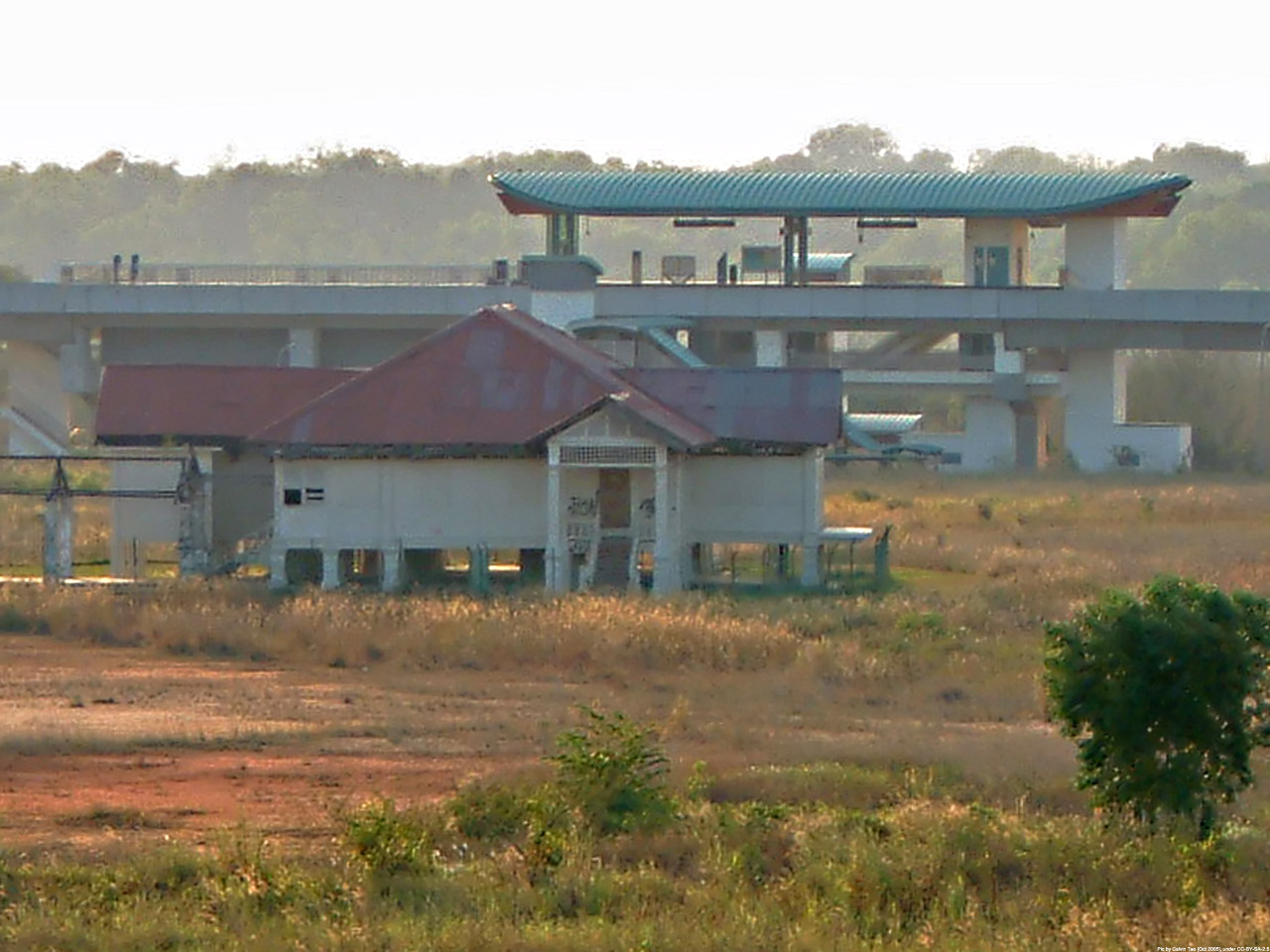
Matilda House in 2004, with Soo Teck LRT station in the background.

In 1985, the government acquired one million meters square of land in Punggol, including the Matilda Estate, which the house was a part of and the Cashins were asked to move out of the property. Given conservation by Singapore's Urban Redevelopment Authority status on 21 February 2000 as a reminder of the past to the residents of Punggol, the land around the building was cleared, and the house was the only building standing. Due to disuse and lack of maintenance, the house fell into ruins and inspired rumours of it being haunted and that it cannot be demolished. It was referred as "Ghost House" or Istana Menanti (The Waiting Palace).

In 2010, the site which the house sits on was put on for sale. It was a frequent haunt for photographers, especially for those who want to take night shots of the place, until the site the house was sold in 2012 for redevelopment.

== Re-development ==
In 2012, the site on which the house sits was sold to property developer Sim Lian Group, which planned to develop the site into a residential condominium known as "A Treasure Trove". The sale conditions included the need to conserve and restore the building and integrate it as part of the housing project. The house was eventually converted into the condominium's clubhouse in 2015 and houses amenities such as function rooms and a gym for its condominium residents.

== Popular culture ==
The house was featured in a 1980s television serial, Tenko, about the experiences of British, Australian, and Dutch women who were captured after the fall of Singapore in February 1942 during World War II. It was also featured in Tanamera – Lion of Singapore, a 1989 Australian drama serial.

== See also ==
- Cashin House, known as The Pier, the Cashin family's weekend resort until 2009
