= Coney Island, Singapore =

Island in northeastern Singapore

Coney Island 实龙岗岛 Shílónggāngdǎo செராங்கூன் தீவு
Native name: Pulau Serangoon
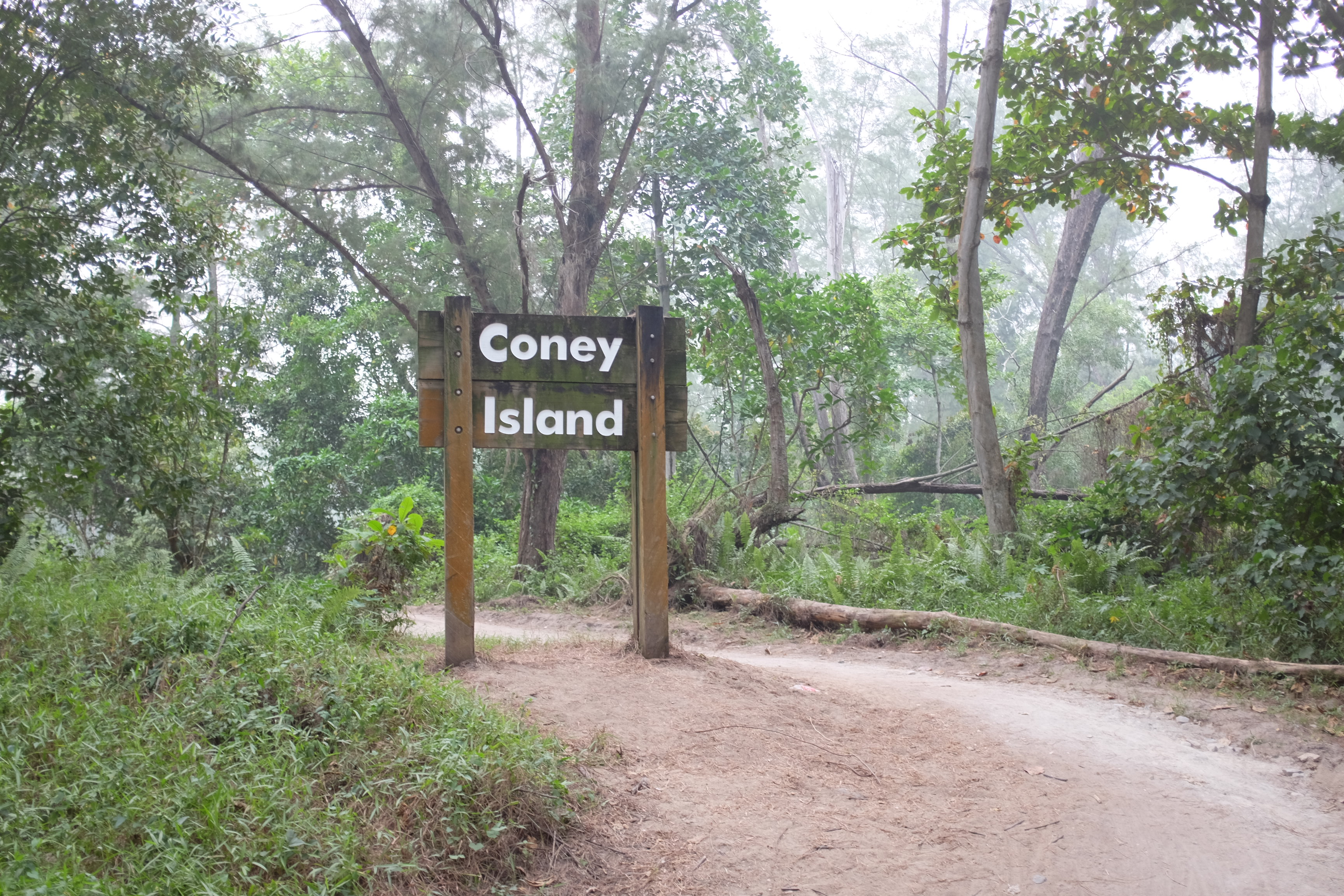
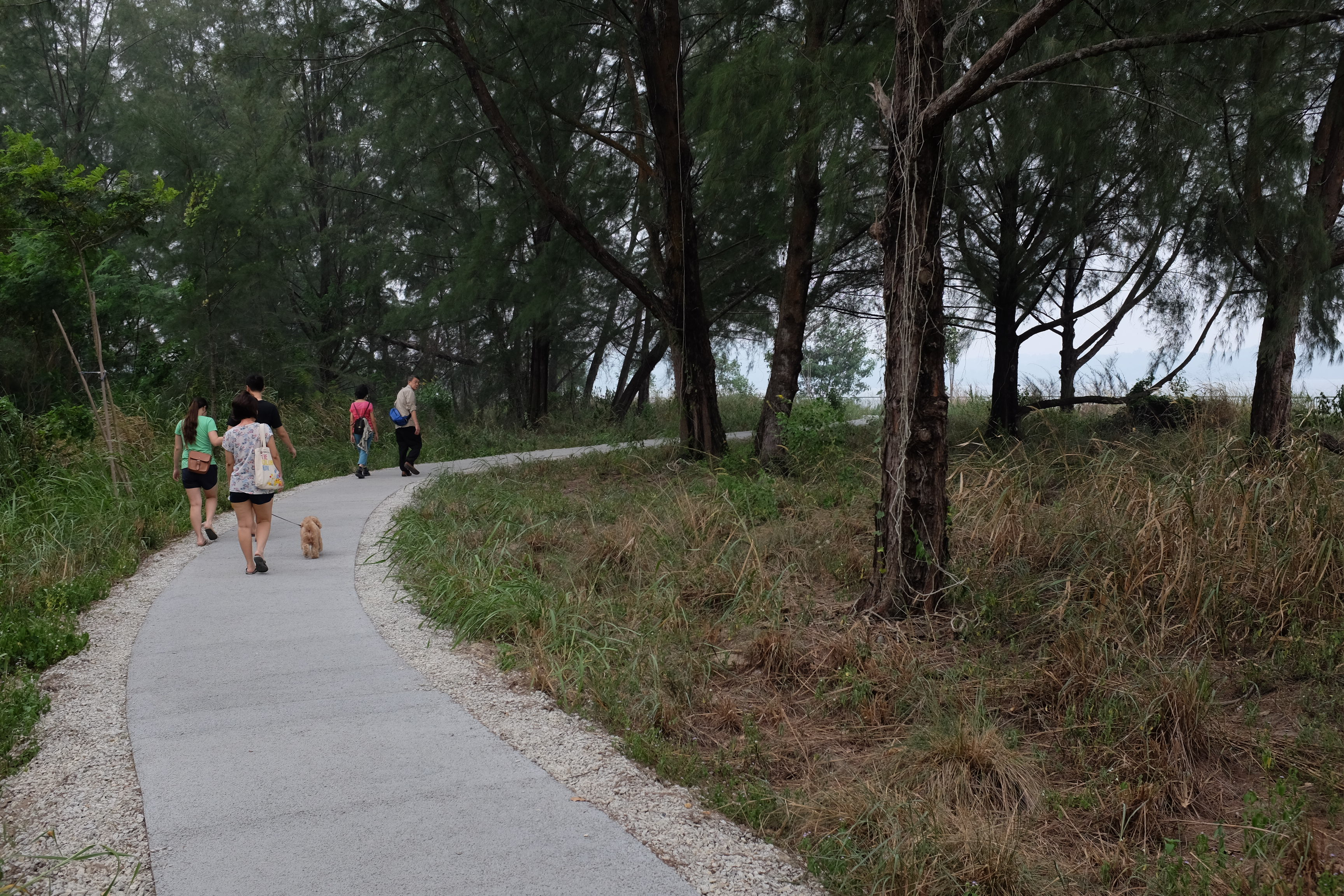
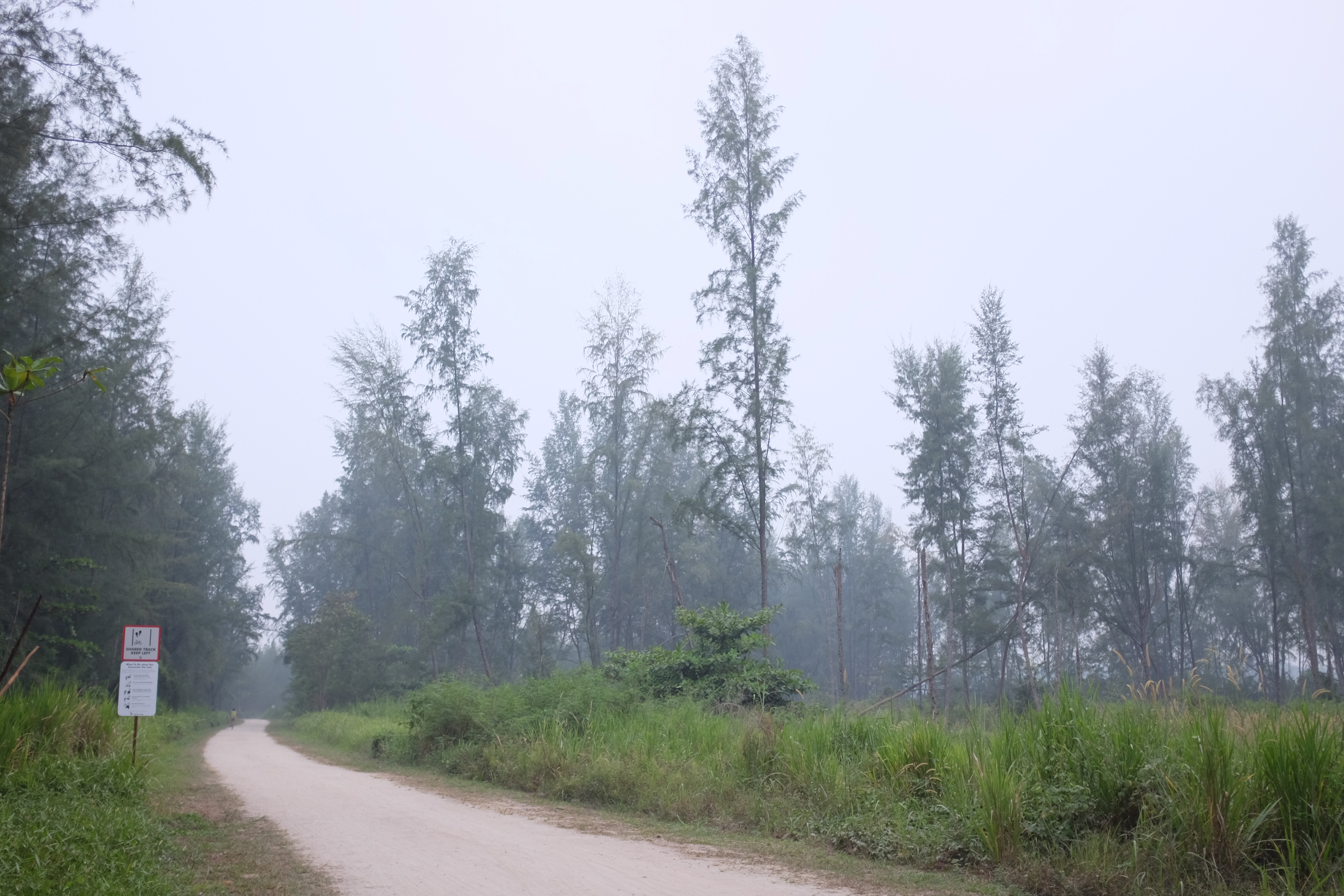

- Location within Singapore

Geography
- Location: Southeast Asia
- Coordinates: 1°24′34.1″N 103°55′18″E
- Archipelago: Malay Archipelago
- Area: 1.33 km^{2} (0.51 sq mi)

Administration
- Singapore
- Region: North-East Region
- Planning Area: Punggol
- CDC: North East CDC
- Town council: Punggol Town Council
- Constituency: Punggol GRC
- Member of Parliament: Gan Kim Yong

Demographics
- Population: 0 (2015)

Additional information
- Official website: Coney Island on NParks

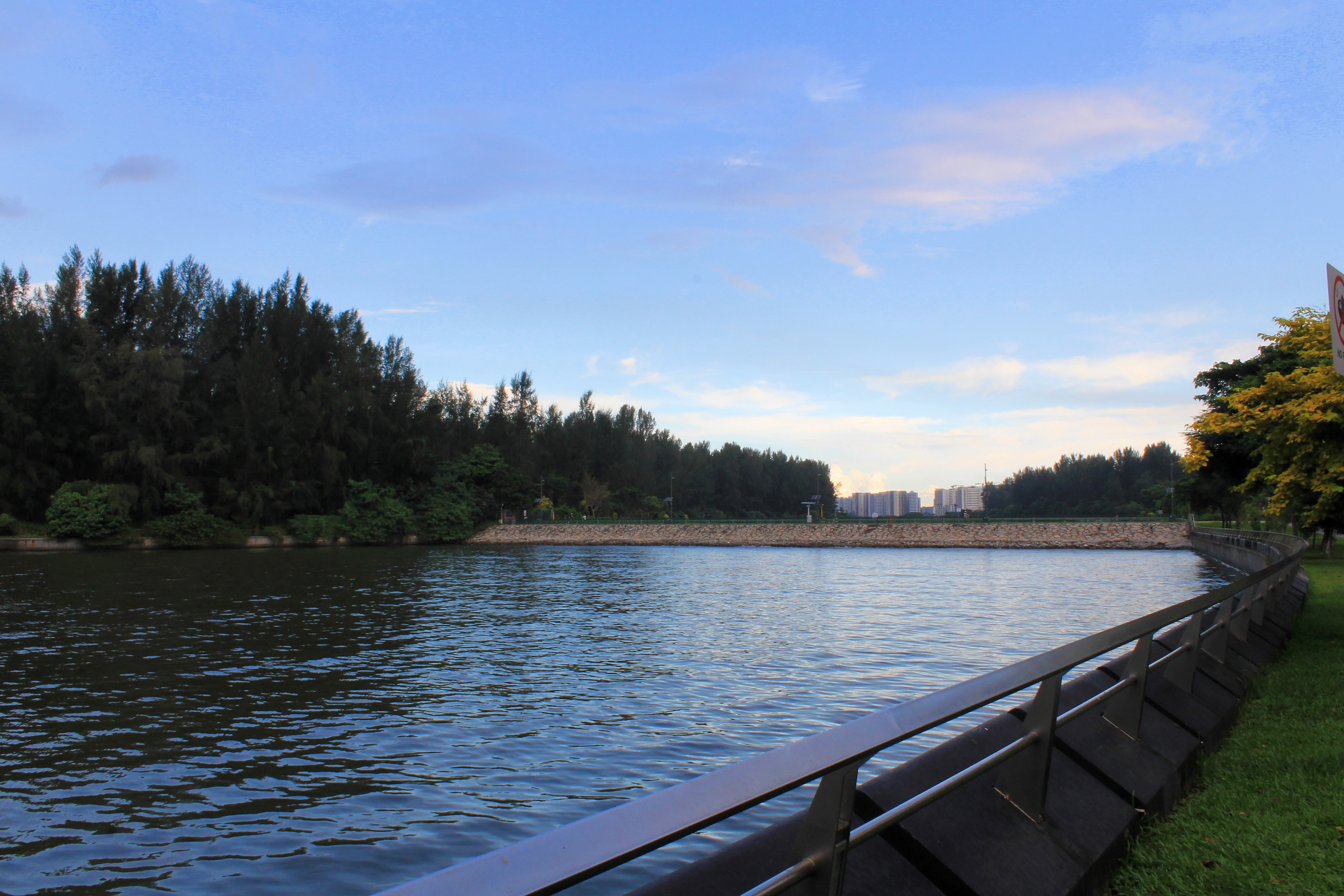
Causeway to Coney Island

Coney Island, alternatively known as Pulau Serangoon, is a 133-hectare island located off the northeastern coast of Singapore within the town of Punggol, between Pulau Ubin to its northeast and the mainland to its southwest.

Land reclamation works were carried out on the island from 1975 to the 1990s, as there were plans to build residential buildings on the southern part of the island. The works narrowed the channel between Punggol and the island to 100m. Still, in spite of this small distance, motor launches had to be specially hired to reach the island until the opening of Coney Island Park, linked to the main island by two bridges on its western and eastern ends.

== History ==
Formerly known as Pulau Serangoon (English: Serangoon Island), the island was once owned by entrepreneur siblings Aw Boon Haw and Aw Boon Par, before being sold to an Indian businessman, Ghulam Mahmood, in 1950 with the intention of turning the island into a resort modelled after the amusement area at Coney Island, New York.

The land reclamation works begun in 1975, increasing the area of the island from 32 hectares (0.32 km^{2}) to 62 hectares (0.62 km^{2}). Further land reclamation works were carried out during the 1990s with plans to build a 50-hectare park together with the development of Punggol New Town.

The Urban Redevelopment Authority (URA) said that under the Master Plan, a part of Coney Island was zoned for residential, sport and recreational use but as the land is not immediately required for development, a part of Coney Island would be kept as an interim park for the time being. The rest of the island was zoned for park use. On 10 October 2015, Coney Island Park opened to the public, with a beach stretching 2 km (1 mi) and a 2.4 km (1.5 mi) long path that is part of the park connector network. The offshore island of Pulau Serangoon (Coney Island), was formerly part of the Changi SMC from 1951 to 1997, then subsumed into East Coast GRC (Siglap division) from 1997 to 2015 before transferring to Pasir Ris-Punggol GRC after the growth of Punggol.

== Activities and facilities ==
Coney Island is also a popular place for jet skiing and camping. However, this has contributed to the beaches being polluted by litter such as discarded cans, instant noodle packets and bottles.

=== Coney Island Park ===
Managed by the National Parks Board, the 81 hectares (0.81 km^{2}) nature park is home to a wide variety of habitats, including coastal forests, grasslands and mangroves. The park was officially opened by the Transport Minister and Co-ordinating Minister for Infrastructure, Khaw Boon Wan on 10 October 2015. During its first year of operation, a free-ranging Brahman cow was frequently sighted in the area.

=== Scouting ===
The island was proposed as the main venue to host the 23rd World Scout Jamboree, as part of a defeated bid by the Singapore Scout Association.

=== Outward Bound Singapore ===
A new campus for Outward Bound Singapore (OBS) is being developed on the eastern part of Coney Island as part of the National Outdoor Adventure Education Masterplan. First announced in 2016, construction began in 2021 and the campus is scheduled to officially open in the second half of 2026.

The campus will become OBS' third campus after Pulau Ubin and East Coast, and is intended to support the expansion of the Ministry of Education's MOE-OBS Challenge programme to all Secondary 3 students in Singapore by 2030.

The development includes advanced ropes courses, integrated climbing systems and other outdoor team-based challenge facilities. The low-rise campus was designed to blend with Coney Island's natural environment and received the Building and Construction Authority's Green Mark Platinum Super Low Energy certification.

== Notes ==
- Victor R Savage, Brenda S A Yeoh (2004), Toponymics - A Study of Singapore Street Names, Eastern Universities Press, ISBN 981-210-364-3
