= Edgefield Secondary School =

- 育德中学; Sekolah Menengah Edgefield
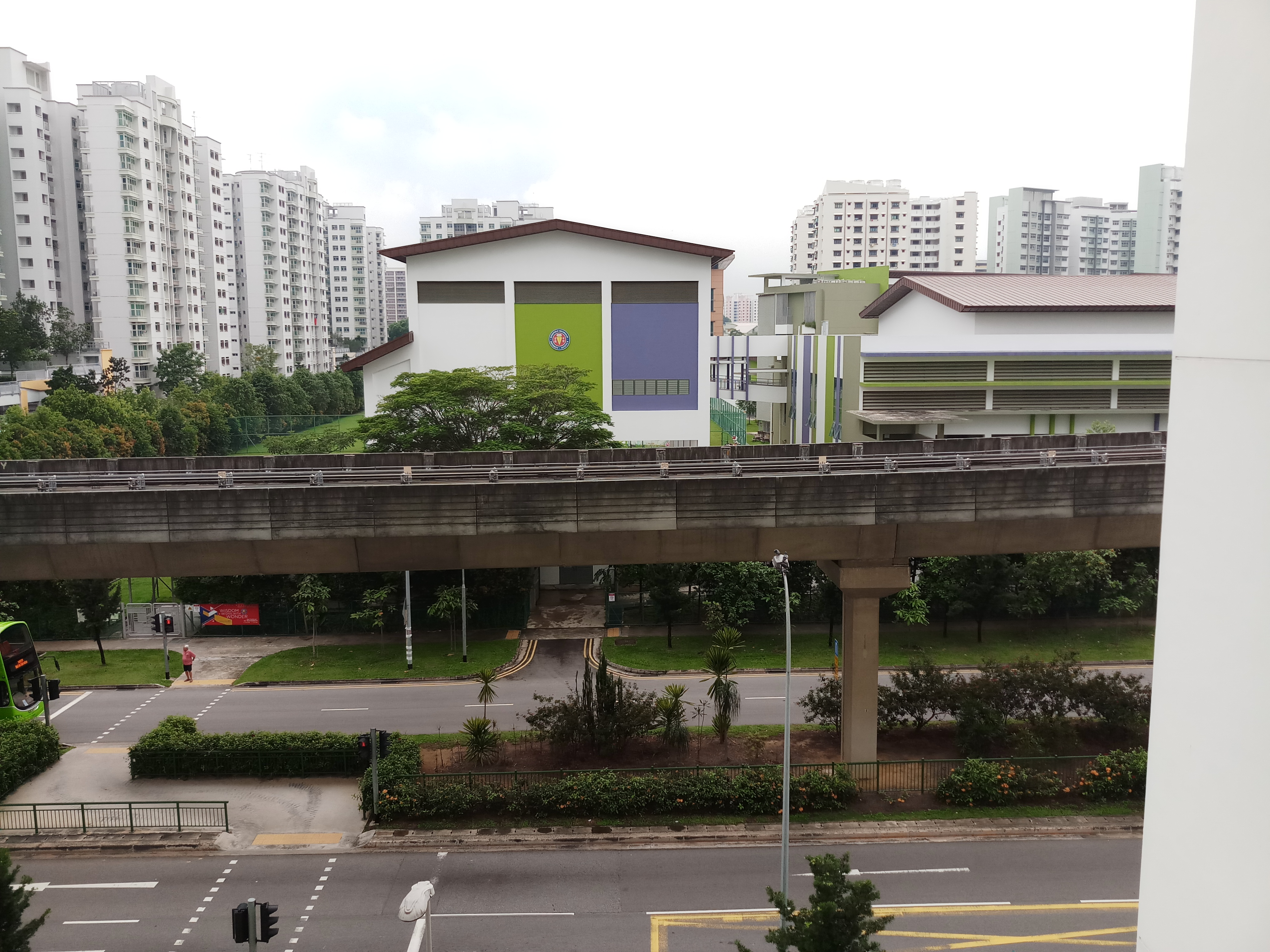

Location
- 36 Punggol Field; Punggol New Town; 828814; Singapore
- Coordinates: 1°24′00.9″N 103°54′08.4″E

Information
- School type: Government
- Motto: "Sincerity and Honour"
- Established: 2011; 15 years ago
- School number: 6883 9511
- School code: 3075
- Principal: Simon Foo Jung Hin (2023–present)
- Gender: Coeducational
- Age range: 13 to 17
- Classes: Secondary 1 to 4 (Express, Normal Academic/Technical) Secondary 5 (Normal Academic)
- Color: Red Yellow Blue
- Website: edgefieldsec.moe.edu.sg

Edgefield Secondary School (EFSS) is a co-educational government secondary school in Punggol, Singapore. Established in 2011, the school offers Express, Normal (Academic), and Normal (Technical) streams. The school has a compulsory taekwondo programme, which is part of the Learning for Life Programme (LLP), and participation in school-wide initiatives such as the Future Ready Programme (FRP) and the Apple Education Programme (AEP).

== History ==
In 2011, Edgefield Secondary School was established by the Ministry of Education.

Mr Leong Kok Kee was appointed the school’s first principal in 2011 by the Ministry of Education.

On 12 July 2013, the school had its official opening ceremony.

The school took part in SG50 as well by setting a new record in the Singapore Book of Records. In collaboration with the Singapore Taekwondo Federation (STF), 1,400 Taekwondo students from Edgefield Secondary School gathered to create a human formation of the SG50 logo to mark Singapore's Golden Jubilee. Students broke 2,800 planks in a team formation, setting the new record for the “Most Number of Planks Broken in Kicking Sequence” in the largest local Taekwondo demonstration.

On 21 October 2016, then vice-principal Lee Peck Ping took over as the new principal after Leong Kok Kee was transferred to Regent Secondary School.

In 2018, phone lockers were also introduced to allow teachers to keep the students’ phones in their classroom locked away till the end of the day. In 2022, the vice-principal introduced the Red-Zone area in the classroom blocks. Students seen with their mobile phone devices in the Red Zones would have their phones confiscated.

In 2022, the school underwent significant renovation to provide for an environment more conducive to learning.

In 2024, Simon Foo Jung Hin was appointed as the new principal of Edgefield Secondary School as part of the Ministry of Education's annual appointment and posting exercise. Prior to his appointment, he served as the vice-principal at Yuying Secondary School. He succeeded Lee Peck Ping, who was transferred to Hwa Chong Institution.

== Programmes ==
At the moment, Edgefield Secondary School is the first and only school in Singapore to have taekwondo as a compulsory curricular activity. It is said that the sport helps instill discipline, respect and perseverance in every student. It also serves its purpose in training self-defence. By the end of Secondary 4, most students are able to achieve black belts.

In 2018, the taekwondo programme was split into two tiers - the lower and upper tier, making it optional for the upper secondary students. Hence, they are given the choice to opt out of the programme if they wish to when they are secondary 3.

The CCA takes part in several competitions every year, including the Singapore National School Games (NSG), with multiple competitors placing in medal positions in various divisions.

In its early years competing in national school taekwondo events, Edgefield Secondary School achieved multiple medals and the “Best Newcomer” title at the National Inter‑School Taekwondo Championships, including third place overall in the ‘C’ Division (Female) category.

At the 2015 National Inter-Schools Taekwondo Championships, Edgefield Secondary School achieved multiple medal placings in multiple divisions, including 3rd place overall in C Division Female, 4th place overall in C Division Male, and 2nd place overall in B Division Female.

For Secondary 1 students, the school has an Apple Education Programme (AEP) to enable them to learn how to use macOS. Thereafter throughout the rest of their lower secondary years, they will attend the Future Ready Programme (FRP) which is a combination of the previously known programmes such as Challenge-Based Learning (CBL), Analytical Thinking Skills (ATS), and Applied Learning Programme (ALP). The FRP uses scenario-based activities to improve students’ digital literacy, critical thinking, and collaboration skills.

In 2022, the school’s applied learning approach and updated curriculum were featured in a Channel NewsAsia (CNA) report on the updated Design and Technology (D&T) curriculum in Singapore by CNA journalist Grace Yeoh. The report examined how secondary schools have updated teaching methods and facilities to better prepare students for real-world problem-solving by increasing focus on improving students’ design thinking skills.

== See also ==
- List of secondary schools in Singapore
