= Campaigning in the 2025 Singaporean general election =

The campaign period of the 2025 Singaporean general election lasted from 23 April to 1 May, with eleven political parties participating in the election, alongside two independent candidates. Ahead of the election, analysts and commentators indicated that rising cost-of-living, employment, and housing affordability were among voters' top concerns. Several constituencies, including East Coast, Marine Parade, Sengkang, and West Coast, were named as potential electoral "hotspots", with social media and podcasts also predicted to play a larger role in the campaign period. This election was the People's Action Party's (PAP) first under prime minister Lawrence Wong's leadership. The election saw similar issues of cost-of-living, employment, housing, and governance amid global economic uncertainty being addressed by political parties during their campaigns.

== Political issues ==
A January 2025 study by Blackbox Research's sentiment tracker, SensingSG, found that the cost of living remained the primary concern for Singaporeans. Voters also cited employment and housing as key issues, while higher-income groups expressed concerns about civil rights and democracy. Respondents indicated they prioritised the quality of governance at the constituency level rather than the national level, with nearly 90% of respondents expressing this view. Additionally, 88% of respondents emphasised the importance of candidate quality in their constituency, while 87.8% highlighted service delivery and infrastructure as key factors. Unlike in other countries, Blackbox anticipated that the upcoming general election would not be driven by personality-based politics.

Bhavan Jaipragas of The Straits Times (ST) commented that beyond everyday concerns like public housing and living costs, opposition parties should also address geopolitical matters as these can significantly influence domestic issues, particularly with the introduction of tariffs by the second Trump administration. Agence France-Presse and Nikkei Asia expected that economic uncertainties due to the tariffs would be a key concern among voters. Jaipragas also called for voters not to take Singapore's relevance and sovereignty for granted as he cited a 2009 Lee Kuan Yew speech. On the other hand, commentators at South China Morning Post (SCMP) expected voters to prioritise domestic issues over international affairs. Analysts on CNA said that the PAP's traditional "flight to safety" strategy during times of crisis – appealing to a desire to retain familiar leadership – could have become less effective amid growing voter scepticism and a more diverse electorate. Teo, on SCMP, added that the electorate could be desiring diverse voices in parliament. Opposition leaders called for unity through parliamentary diversity, pushing back on "government fearmongering". Analysts expected that trust-building, demonstrations of sincerity, and clear communication of plans to address both global developments and domestic issues would be essential in shaping electoral outcomes.

Ahead of the upcoming election, CNA and other Mediacorp media outlets identified East Coast, Marine Parade, Sengkang, and West Coast Group Representation Constituencies (GRC) as potential election "hotspots", with residents across these districts primarily concerned about the rising cost of living, employment, job security, and housing affordability. In East Coast, where the People's Action Party (PAP) narrowly defeated the Workers' Party (WP) in 2020, ageing infrastructure and elderly support were flagged as major issues. Private estate owners also sought greater transparency on lease renewals. In Marine Parade, in addition to concerns regarding immigration, job competition, school placements, it was speculated that PAP politician Tan Chuan-Jin's marital affair could influence the constituency's electoral outcome as he was well-regarded among residents there. In WP-held Sengkang, national issues were seen to be prioritised over constituency-level issues like estate cleanliness. Meanwhile, in West Coast, where the PAP won by 3.36% in 2020, estate management and transport were key concerns. The prosecution of the PAP's S. Iswaran and the presence of Tan Cheng Bock, the founder of the Progress Singapore Party (PSP) and a former PAP member of parliament (MP), could determine the outcome of the election.

In a CNA survey after the redrawing of electoral boundaries, most residents in redrawn constituencies like East Coast GRC, Marine Parade–Braddell Heights GRC, and West Coast–Jurong West GRC were largely indifferent to the changes. However, residents in East Coast and Marine Parade–Braddell Heights GRCs had questioned the rationale, and political analysts noted that the opposition could face more challenges. ST analysts, such as Mustafa Izzuddin and Felix Tan, believed that the boundary changes had strengthened support for the PAP in newly formed western GRCs. Analysts also suggested that East Coast GRC could be highly competitive due to the inclusion of educated, middle-class voters in Joo Chiat, who could prioritise political pluralism and checks on parliamentary power. Political observer Tan noted that younger voters in the newly formed Punggol GRC could potentially influence voting trends, where The Straits Times expected a fierce PAP–WP contest. However, Teo believed that many voters would focus more on national issues, party performance, and candidate quality than constituency-specific changes.

== Use of social media ==
Before the election campaign, The Straits Times reported in 2024 that politicians and political parties were prioritising their social media presence, with Teo Kay Key predicting that social media would play a significant role in the upcoming general election campaign. According to Bhavan Jaipragas of The Straits Times, the political climate in Singapore remained "comparatively healthy", but noted increasing polarisation on social media.

The PAP engaged social media influencers, with its MPs having actively used social media for outreach. In a March 2025 CNA Today article, the party claimed to avoid a "one-size-fits-all" approach to social media. According to itself, its MPs addressed a range of issues important to them and their residents, utilising social media in ways that "best [suited] their personalities". The WP and other opposition parties had also regularly updated their accounts with walkabout reports and other activities, considering social media essential for "levelling the playing field" and direct engagement with Singaporeans. Ravi Philemon, the secretary-general of Red Dot United (RDU), said that a social media presence was essential to compete against established parties with large followings. However, many had to operate with limited resources and depend on volunteers to manage their social media accounts.

While social media engagement was seen as crucial for voter outreach, Teo considered the electorate unlikely to rely solely on social media in their voting choices. According to the WP, social media was a complement rather than a substitute for its "longstanding" commitment to on-the-ground engagement ("ground work"). On the other hand, Singapore Democratic Party (SDP) vice-chairperson Bryan Lim stated that social media had been effective in addressing "some of the weaknesses of ground work," such as allowing him to connect with constituents he had failed to engage with in-depth.

=== Podcasts ===
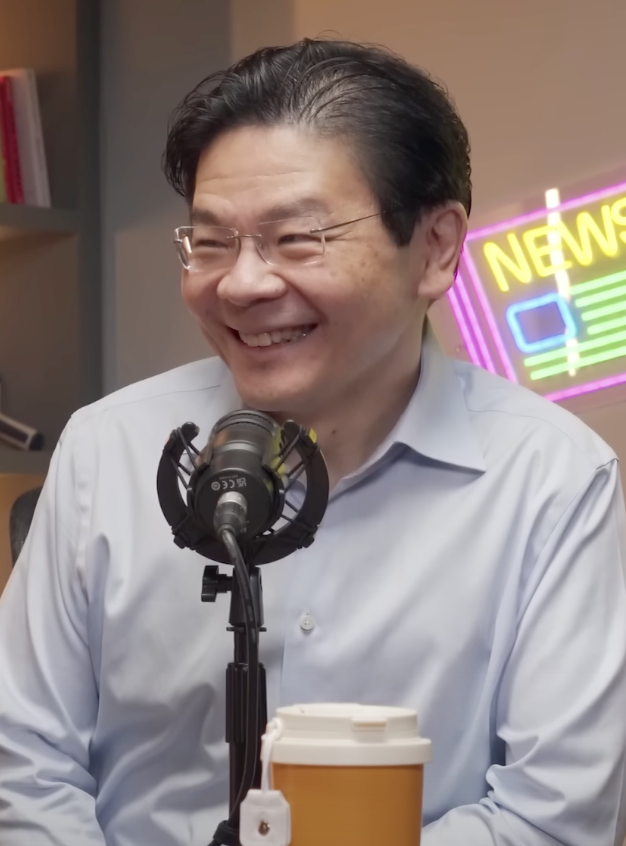
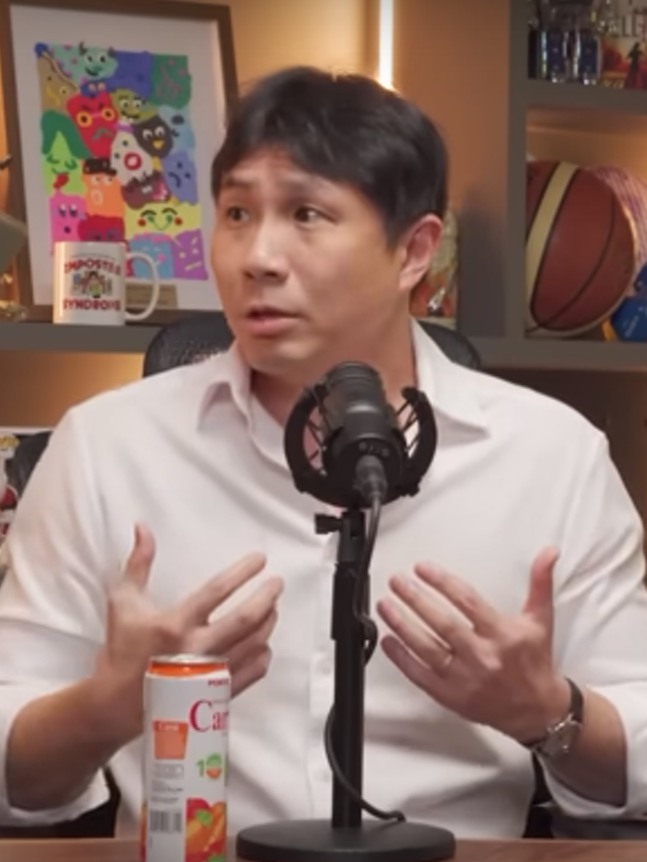
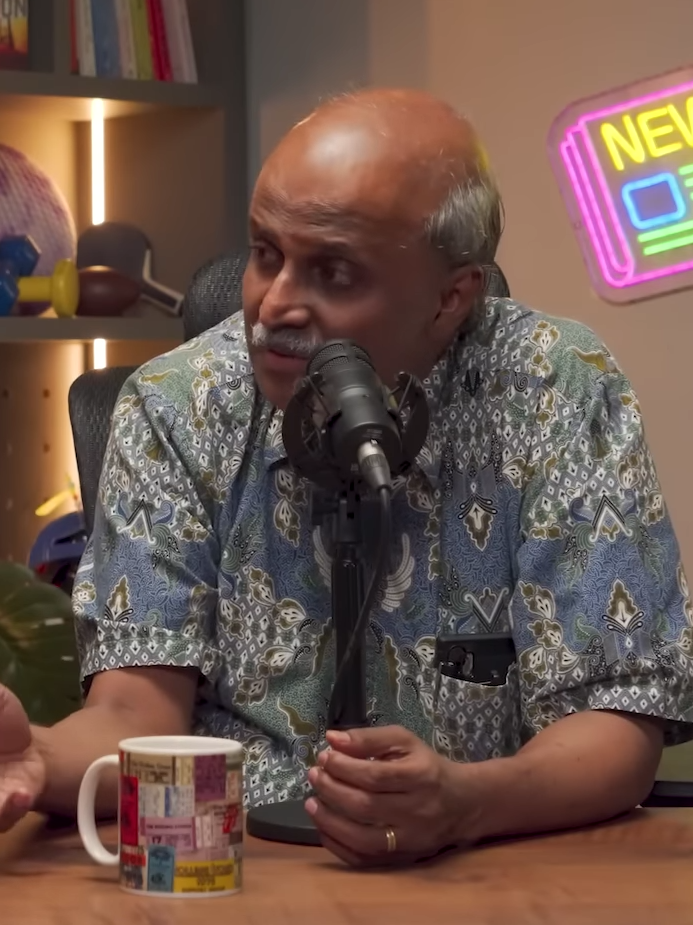
(L–R) PAP's Lawrence Wong, WP's Jamus Lim, and SDP's Paul Tambyah on The Daily Ketchup Podcast.

Politicians, including prime minister Lawrence Wong, health minister Ong Ye Kung, and non-constituency member of parliament (NCMP) Hazel Poa, appeared on local podcasts as part of their communication and campaign strategies. Producers and hosts of four Singaporean podcasts told CNA Today that political interest in appearing on their platforms had surged since 2020, especially ahead of the 2025 general election. Experts interviewed by The Straits Times suggested that the casual format allowed politicians to connect with voters beyond traditional media, particularly younger people and older millennials. Kenneth Paul Tan of Hong Kong Baptist University noted that podcasts in Singapore served both as hegemonic reinforcement and contestation. While allowing the PAP to humanise its leaders and foster relatability, it also allowed the opposition to bypass mainstream media, challenge the PAP, and appeal to disillusioned Singaporeans, especially in Singapore's tightly controlled media landscape. Tan also believed that podcasts during the election changed Singaporeans' engagement with politics as politicians became more candid while voters "began listening differently".

Natalie Pang, head of the National University of Singapore's (NUS) Department of Communications and New Media, added that such podcasts could provide a platform for individuals with differing political views to engage in candid exchange with one another, an "important" factor amid rising political polarisation worldwide. Pang also highlighted that some podcast hosts had been willing to challenge politicians on their shows, often voicing public concerns and asking pressing questions. Nevertheless, commentators on CNA Today noted that viral online content did not necessarily translate into electoral success, as voters had mixed opinions on its influence. They also said that social media's reach was more confined to specific demographics, particularly younger voters. On 26 April, The Straits Times' Usual Place Podcast episode debated about the word "abandonment", which had been used heavily during earlier rallies, particularly the PPP and SDP's rallies. The podcast also questioned onto conviction politics in reference to WP candidate Harpreet Singh Nehal.

== Political broadcasts and debates ==
Two Party Political Broadcasts (PPBs) were held on 25 April and 1 May, during the campaigning period. Political parties fielding at least six candidates under a recognised party symbol were allowed to deliver their campaigning messages on the PPBs. Mediacorp also hosted two roundtable talks on 27 and 29 April.

=== Slogans and manifestos ===
Party/coalition	English slogan	Other official languages	Refs
People's Action Party	Changed World, Fresh Team, New Resolve – Securing a Brighter Future for You	Chinese: 世界剧变，团队更新，坚持初衷，共创辉煌; Malay: Dunia Berkisar, Barisan Segar, Azam Berkobar; Tamil: மாறிவரும் உலகம், புதிய அணி, மாறாத உறுதி	
Workers' Party	Working for Singapore	Chinese: 投工人党一票，为国效劳; Malay: Bekerja Untuk Singapura; Tamil: சிங்கப்பூருக்கு உழைக்கிறோம்	
Progress Singapore Party	Progress for All	Chinese: 携手前进; Malay: Kemajuan Untuk Semua; Tamil: அனைவருக்கும் முன்னேற்றம்	
People's Power Party	Make Singapore Home Again	Chinese: 新加坡是吾家; Malay: Jadikan Singapura Rumah Semula	
Singapore Democratic Party	Thrive, Not Just Survive	Chinese: 走出平庸，迈向共荣; Malay: Berkembang Maju, Bukan Sekadar Bertahan; Tamil: செழித்து வளருங்கள், வெறுமனே வாழாதீர்கள்	
Singapore People's Party	It Is Time	Chinese: 现在是时候; Malay: Sudah Tiba Masanya; Tamil: இதுவே தகுந்த நேரம்	
Red Dot United	First-Class Citizens, Fairer Singapore	Chinese: 头等公民，更公平的新加坡; Malay: Warga Kelas Pertama, Singapura Yang Lebih Adil; Tamil: முதல்தரமான குடிமக்கள், நியாயமான சிங்கப்பூர்	
National Solidarity Party	Your Future, Our Priority – A Bright Future for Singapore	Chinese: 您的未来，我们的首要使命和任务; Malay: Masa Hadapan Anda, Keutamaan Kami; Tamil: உங்கள் எதிர்காலம், எங்கள் முன்னுரிமை	
Singapore Democratic Alliance	Make Change Happen	Chinese: 为国挺身, 一起奋进; Malay: Perubahan Di Tangan Anda; Tamil: சிங்கப்பூர் உங்களை நம்பி இருக்கிறது. மாற்றத்தைஏற்படுத்துங்கள்.	
Singapore United Party	Moving Forward, Together	Chinese: 共同前进; Malay: Maju Ke Hadapan, Bersama; Tamil: ஒன்றாக முன்னேறுவோம்	
People's Alliance for Reform	Take Back What Belongs to You	Chinese: 拿回属于你的东西; Malay: Ambil Balik Apa Yang Hak Awak; Tamil: உனக்குரியதை எடுத்துக்கொள்	
Darryl Lo	Your Voice, Our Future	Chinese: 您的心声，我们的未来; Malay: Suara Anda, Masa Depan Kita; Tamil: உங்கள் குரல், நமது எதிர்காலம்	
Jeremy Tan	Be Retired, Not Tired		

=== Opinion polls ===
Under Section 78C of the Parliamentary Elections Act, it is illegal to publish the results of any election survey during the campaign period.

Dates conducted	Pollster	Client	Sample size	PAP	WP	PSP	Others	Lead
25 Mar – 1 Apr 2025	YouGov	N/A	1,845	40%	12%	1%	47% SPP on 1% SDP on 1% NSP on 1% Other on 1% Rather not say on 29% Don't know on 13%	28
10 July 2020	2020 general election	–	–	61.23%	11.22%	10.18%	17.37% SPP on 1.52% SDP on 4.45% NSP on 3.75% Other on 7.65%	50.01

=== Foreign interference ===
On 25 April, the Infocomm Media Development Authority (IMDA) ordered Meta to restrict Singaporeans' access to social media posts by foreign nationals it had flagged as foreign interference in the election. Among those accused of illegal campaigning were Zulfikar bin Mohamad Shariff, an Australian citizen who renounced his Singapore citizenship in 2020 who had been previously detained under the Internal Security Act (ISA), and two Malaysians: Iskandar Abdul Samad, national treasurer of the Malaysian Islamic Party (PAS), and Mohamed Sukri Omar, the PAS youth chief in Selangor. Iskandar had expressed support for WP MP Faisal Manap, while Sukri reposted a post by Zulfikar criticising Malay–Muslim MPs for failing to represent Muslim interests. Senior minister of state Zaqy Mohamad warned of disruption if Singaporeans voted along religious lines, while saying that it could be common outside of Singapore. However, Iskandar denied the accusations of foreign interference against him and "slammed" the attempt to link PAS to the WP. He stated that the post was "aimed at his predominantly Malay Muslim audience in Malaysia" rather than an "audience in Singapore". During a PAP walkabout in Tampines GRC on 29 April, former prime minister Lee Hsien Loong called for the separation of race and religion from politics.

Noor Deros, a Singaporean Islamic religious teacher based in Kuala Lumpur, Malaysia, also claimed that the WP "had agreed to his political demands" after meeting with some of the party's Malay candidates. WP secretary-general Pritam Singh denied this, adding that while the WP "[had] no control over foreigners supporting candidates", he stated that the party would be unsuccessful if it "[played the] race and religion card". Other opposition parties, including the SDP, PSP and National Solidarity Party (NSP), also stated their opposition to foreign interference, rejecting any foreign support. Deros denied trying to interfere in Singapore's politics and claimed to advocate on behalf of "marginalised" Malay–Muslim Singaporeans. Separately, one day after the restriction was imposed, RDU candidate Liyana Dhamirah lodged a police report for online harassment pertaining to "racist and sexist undertones".

As of 29 April, around 5,000 comments posted by 900 fake Facebook accounts and bots spreading anti-PAP and anti-WP sentiments and targeting news coverage of foreign interference were found, and the Ministry of Digital Development and Information (MDDI) urged Singaporeans to remain discerning in their consumption of information. On 30 April, Jom, an online publication website, was blocked due to a violation of promoting unauthorised third-party paid online election advertising (OEA) and the use of forbidden articles and materials, according to MDDI.

== Party campaigns ==
=== People's Action Party ===
The 2025 general election was the first under Lawrence Wong's leadership, with Nikkei Asia describing the vote as "a key test of public confidence" in the new prime minister. On 13 April, Wong acknowledged that the PAP would face a "fiercely contested" election, with no constituencies guaranteed as "safe seats" for the party. Wong also announced that the PAP would field at least 30 new candidates in the election – the largest slate in the party's recent history. Wong stated "profound changes" and growing global uncertainty as reasons for calling for the vote, allowing Singaporeans to choose a leadership team to navigate future challenges.

On 17 April, the PAP launched their manifesto, presented as a "roadmap" in navigating global uncertainties. To address the cost of living, the PAP planned to distribute CDC vouchers, cash payouts, and utility rebates to households, while enhancing support schemes for lower-income families and seniors such as ComCare, Silver Support, and ComLink+. It also promised to reduce preschool fees, raise childcare subsidies, expand parental leave, and provide more support for larger families. The PAP aimed to support businesses facing rising costs with tax rebates and policies like the Progressive Wage Credit Scheme. It also proposed investment in transport, digital infrastructure, and clean energy (including nuclear) while accelerating tech adoption. For seniors, it proposed raising the re-employment age, increasing CPF contributions, and co-funding wages. PMETs (professionals, managers, executives and technicians) were to receive help through leadership development, re-skilling initiatives, and jobseeker support under SkillsFuture, a national retraining scheme. On housing, the PAP made plans to build 50,000 new flats in the next three years, and offer more public housing options for higher-income couples and singles. It also planned to rejuvenate new towns through the Voluntary Early Redevelopment Scheme.

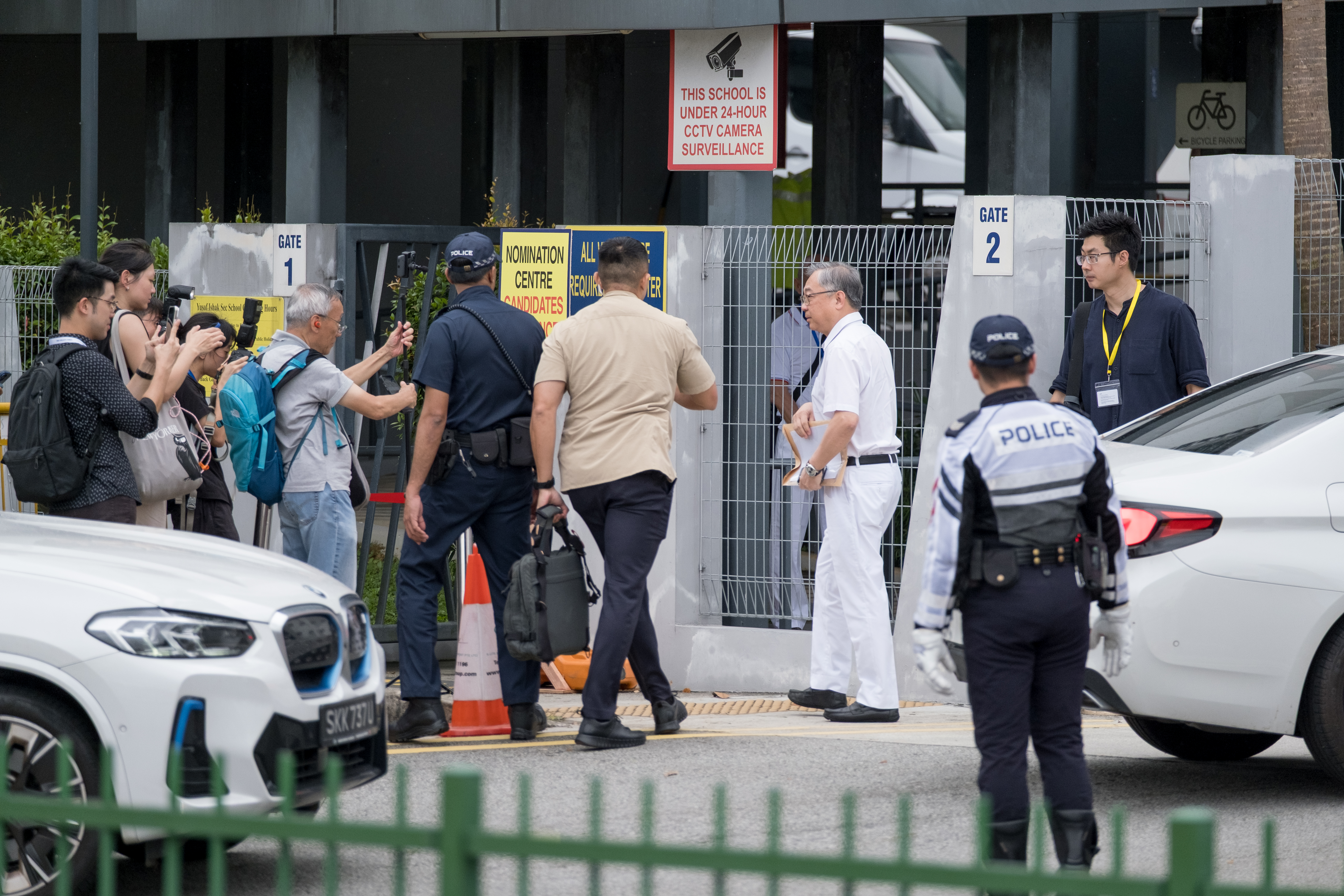
Deputy prime minister Gan Kim Yong (in white) arriving at Yusof Ishak Secondary School on Nomination Day. He was nominated as part of the PAP team for Punggol GRC.

Thirty-two new PAP candidates were introduced in the election, including a former Nominated MP (NMP), a former Chief of Army for the Singapore Armed Forces (SAF), six civil servants, a chief of staff at the SAF, and a Mediacorp news presenter. Nineteen PAP candidates retired, including four cabinet ministers (Ng Eng Hen, Maliki Osman, senior minister Teo Chee Hean, and deputy prime minister Heng Swee Keat), senior ministers of state Amy Khor and Heng Chee How, and five one-term MPs. (Note: The three previously contested candidates who contested unsuccessfully in 2020, Chua Eng Leong, Shamsul Kamar (both who also contested in 2015) and Raymond Lye, did not contest this election. Another one-term MP who also contested unsuccessfully in 2020, Amrin Amin, also did not contest.) CNA Today stated that their diverse backgrounds (two-fifths were women, and half of them were under 40) showed how the party was attempting to stay "relevant in a changing political landscape". Teo believed that the new candidates from the private sector highlighted an increasing focus by the PAP on community engagement and people-oriented industries. According to professor Terence Ho, the PAP strategically secured a walkover in Marine Parade–Braddell Heights GRC on Nomination Day by redeploying anchor minister Tan See Leng to Chua Chu Kang GRC while sending deputy prime minister Gan Kim Yong, who had previously been positioned there, to defeat a WP team in Punggol GRC.

During the PAP's first rally, Wong warned the opposition against inflaming sensitive issues or using domestic politics to cause political divisions especially during uncertain times. In his statement during the first PPB, he called the election timed "at a time of profound global change" and pledged to prioritise important matters. He also said that voters would have to make a "crucial decision" for the country's future in the polls. On 25 April, foreign minister Vivian Balakrishnan, contesting Holland–Bukit Timah GRC, urged opposition candidates to focus on offering "real solutions", a statement later reiterated by education minister Chan Chun Sing. In another rally on 26 April, youth minister Edwin Tong, contesting East Coast GRC, insisted that there was no "silver bullet" for upcoming challenges and urged voters not to be swayed by "rhetoric" or "soundbites" promising "easy solutions". At a 29 April rally, K. Shanmugam, minister for law and home affairs, warned of job risks due to tariffs in the second Trump administration and urged the public to trust the government's budget measures, emphasising that the PAP "always [told] the truth directly".

At a lunchtime rally on 28 April, Wong warned that voting for the opposition would weaken the PAP by ousting ministers and accused the opposition of seeking more seats without responsibility. Indranee Rajah claimed that opposition voices would still exist under the NCMP scheme, and pledged that the PAP government would continue providing support, such as CDC vouchers, GST vouchers, cash payouts, and utilities rebates, to address cost pressures she deemed "externally driven". Senior minister Lee Hsien Loong said that a "good government" required "good people" and urged voters against voting out key ministers (Note: There are three cabinet ministers that have been voted out since independence, which were Ng Chee Meng in 2020, as well as Lim Hwee Hua and George Yeo back in the 2011 elections. Before this, K. M. Byrne, who lost his seat in 1963, was also a full cabinet minister. To date as of 2020, there have been a total of eight office holders (including one acting cabinet minister, two ministers of state, and two parliamentary secretaries) who also lost re-election.) during uncertainty. On 29 April, Lee dismissed Singh's "ridiculous" claim that the government could function without a two-thirds majority. Wong also told the media that the WP's view of voting out ministers was a "cavalier and irresponsible approach". On 1 May, Wong refuted Singh's claims that negative politics was ingrained in the PAP's DNA, asserting instead that the party is committed to "forging as wide a national consensus" on contentious issues and "bringing Singaporeans together". He also emphasised that the effectiveness of policy debates in Parliament depended more on the quality of contributions than the number of voices.

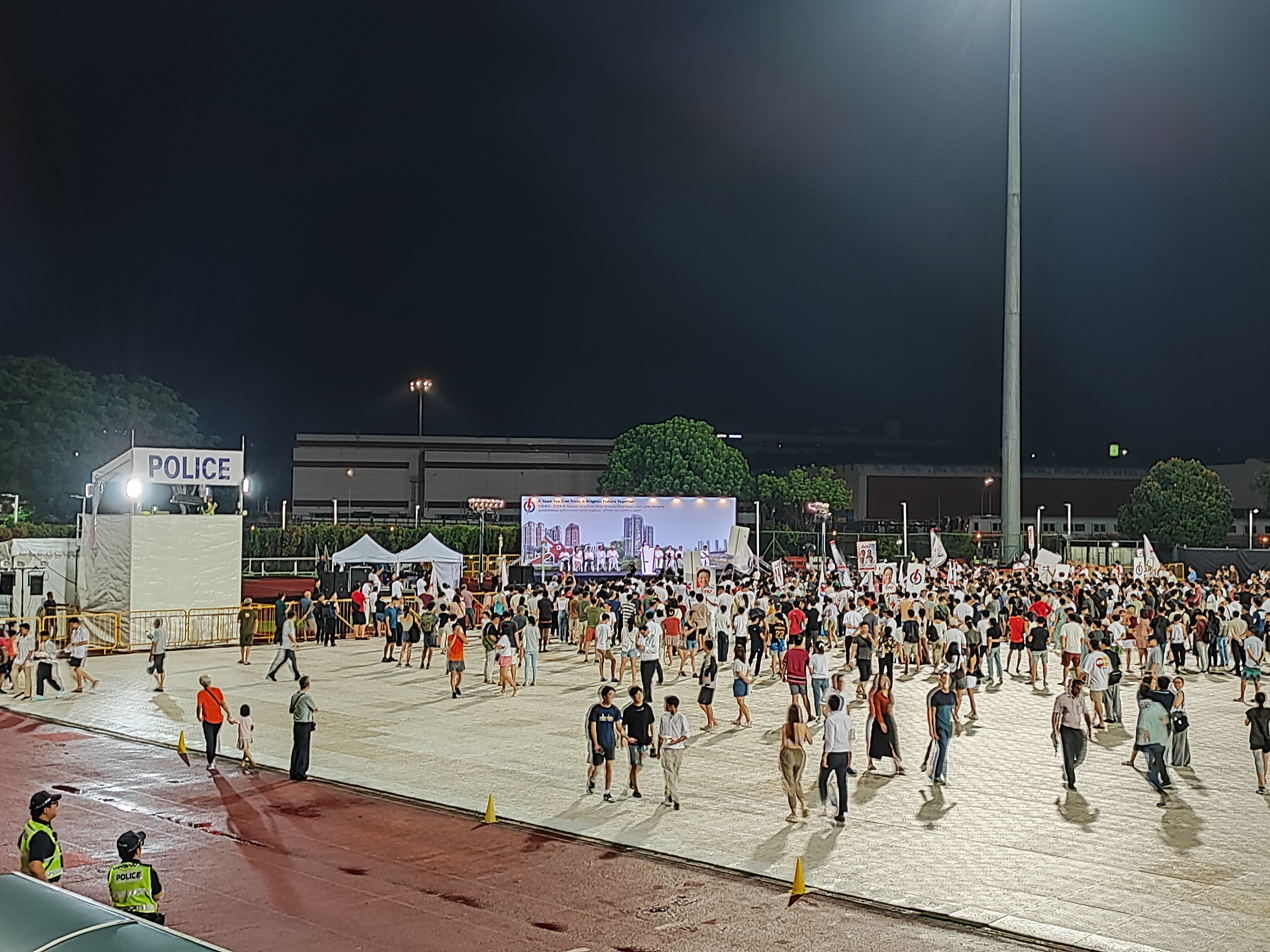
A PAP rally in Bishan–Toa Payoh GRC on 30 April.

Addressing Singh's criticisms that labour MPs had ignored a controversial deal to sell 51% of NTUC Income to Allianz that was scrapped after public outrage, Ng Chee Meng, secretary-general of the National Trades Union Congress (NTUC) and PAP candidate for Jalan Kayu Single Member Constituency (SMC), stated on 27 April that the deal was made "in good faith" and had been considered "reasonable" as it was intended to strengthen income and safeguard the interests of policyholders. In light of public concerns, Ng said he had initiated a review within NTUC Enterprise and pledged that the organisation would "do better". Chan Chun Sing, a former secretary-general of NTUC, also defended labour MPs against WP criticisms, stating that they "[worked] quietly behind the scenes" to represent workers and raise diverse issues in Parliament. He rejected Singh's claim that NTUC served as a "trampoline" for losing PAP candidates and instead emphasised that voters should assess parties based on their ability to deliver jobs, wages, and price stability, and whether their proposals were realistic and financially sustainable. On 28 April, former NTUC Income Insurance CEO Tan Suee Chieh published an open letter calling for Gan Kim Yong to provide full disclosure regarding his role in the deal; the letter became viral across various social media platforms. In his Labour Day speech on 1 May, Wong expressed gratitude to union workers, while also cautioning against voting out key ministers and urging voters to judge the PAP fairly. Separately, Ng reflected on his experiences over the five years between the two elections during his opening remarks. At the PAP's final rallies, Wong, while visiting the secondary schools of North Vista and Yusof Ishak to support the PAP teams for the GRCs of Sengkang and Punggol, reiterated a point that the government Singaporeans wanted, and not the number of seats the PAP won, mattered in the election.

The PAP spent S$9.4 million in their campaign. According to PAP activists interviewed on CNA Today, their campaign strategy involved prioritising resources in the eastern and north-eastern electoral hotspots, avoiding personal attacks in favor of policy discussions, and leveraging incumbency strengths by emphasising constituency-level achievements. Felix Tan of NTU described Wong's first election campaign as "rather safe". Although his speeches lacked the gravitas of past leaders, Tan noted that Wong successfully highlighted the PAP's handling of the pandemic and its record on economic management. Elsewhere, several Reddit users began to question about PAP's campaigning strategies and criticized some of the teams for not campaigning hard in both safe and battleground constituencies. As of 1 May 2025, a man was under police investigation for leading two individuals under 16 to distribute PAP flyers in Punggol GRC, an action prohibited under Singaporean law.

=== Workers' Party ===
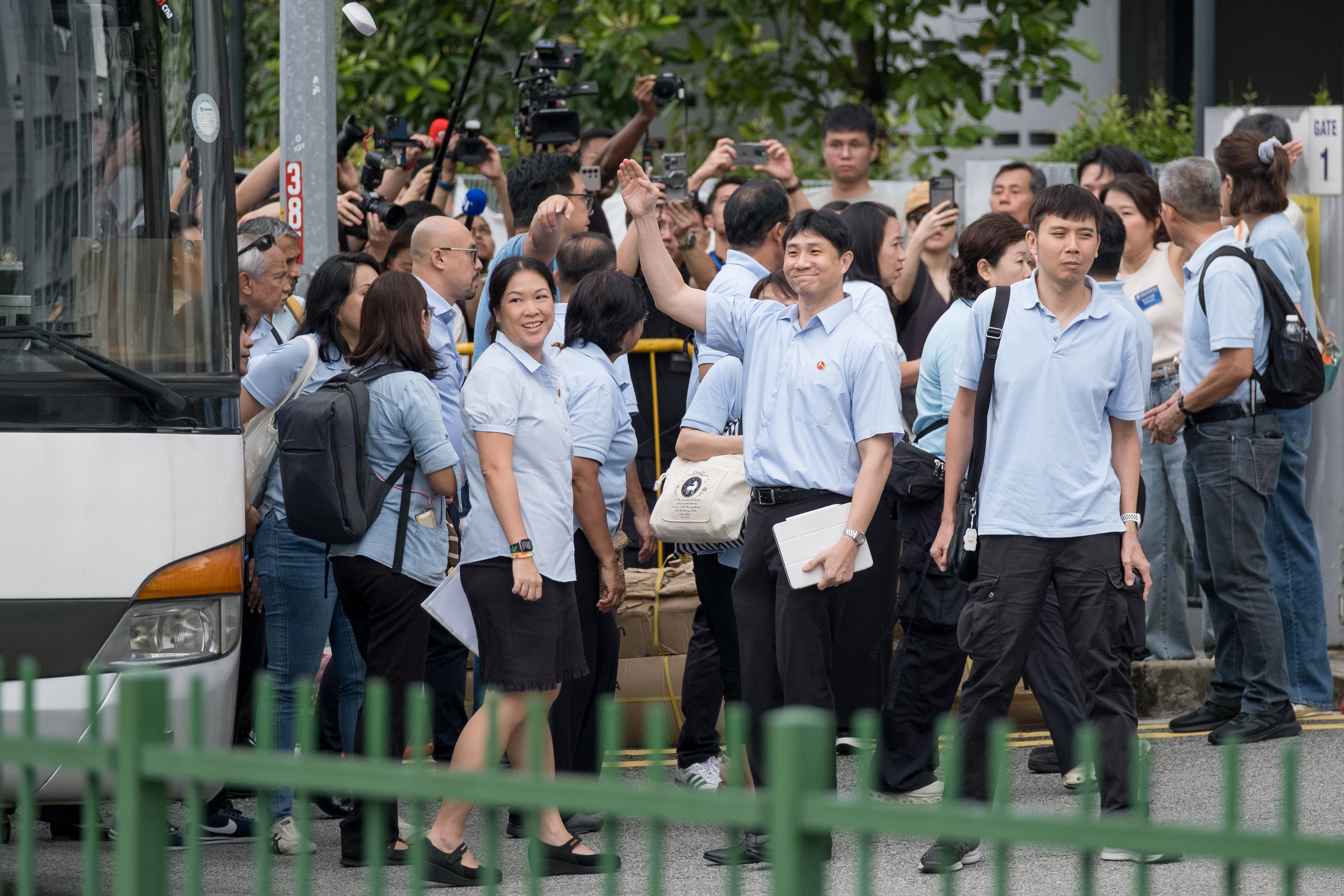
WP candidates Jamus Lim and He Ting Ru on Nomination Day.

Following the dissolution of Parliament, Singh thanked residents of Aljunied GRC, Hougang SMC, and Sengkang GRC for the "privilege of [service]". Shortly after, the WP launched its campaign slogan "Working for Singapore", alongside a teaser video emphasising a need for political balance. Singh also called for donations for its campaign, noting that costs for running a campaign had "risen considerably". On 16 April, the WP claimed that 15 policy proposals, which it had previously advocated for, were adopted "in some form" by the government, covering areas like housing, transport, and employment. Eugene Tan, an associate professor at Singapore Management University (SMU), believed that the move signalled the WP's campaign strategy of positioning itself as an effective, constructive opposition and suggesting that it could achieve more with greater parliamentary presence. The PAP rejected the strategy, asserting that the ideas originated from its own MPs, and accused the WP of aligning itself with government successes.

On 17 April, the WP launched its manifesto, which included 125 policy proposals. To address the cost of living, the party called for exemptions of the Goods and Services Tax (GST) on essential items and the introduction of a minimum wage of S$1,600 (US$1194.03). Regarding economic concerns, it proposed recognising and valuing unpaid household labour to correct what it called a perception that only paid work was meaningful. The WP also called for stronger leadership support in small and medium enterprises (SMEs) to improve talent attraction, the abolition of the statutory retirement age to give older workers more choice, and refinements to CPF policies, including allowing members to co-invest savings with GIC, a sovereign wealth fund. On housing, it proposed using first-time buyers' median income to assess affordability, offering lower-priced 70-year Build-To-Order (BTO) flats with a 29-year lease extension option, a universal buy-back scheme for ageing flats, and greater transparency in land valuation processes. Other proposals included the repeal of the Internal Security Act, the enactment of a Freedom of Information Act, and formal recognition of the State of Palestine.

On 17 April, Singh confirmed that the WP would field candidates for less than a third of parliamentary seats, 14 of which were new. On Nomination Day, the WP fielded its candidates to contest 26 seats in the GRCs of Punggol, Sengkang, Aljunied, Tampines, and East Coast, and the SMCs of Jalan Kayu, Tampines Changkat, and Hougang. Chairperson Sylvia Lim described the slate as the "most promising" group of candidates the party had fielded to date. Wong Pei Ting of The Straits Times noted the WP mounted a "considerably larger campaign" for 2025 compared to its 2020 campaign efforts.

However, the WP decided not to contest Marine Parade–Braddell Heights GRC, which resulted in a walkover for the PAP. Justifying the decision, Singh said that the WP had to make the "difficult decision" due to its lack of resources and the extensive boundary changes of the constituency. The move was widely criticised by various other opposition parties. Goh Meng Seng, the secretary-general of the People's Power Party (PPP) and a former WP member, criticised the WP as a "spoiler party" for contesting against the PPP and the NSP in Tampines GRC, while chairperson Derrick Sim was "dumbfounded" by the WP's "lame excuse". Sim claimed that the WP had never contested Tampines GRC since the creation of the constituency in 1988. (Note: The present-day Tampines GRC had wards previously part of Eunos GRC, which appeared in the 1988 and 1991 general elections, and Pasir Ris GRC in the 1997 general election. The WP contested in all of these occasions, being narrowly defeated both times in Eunos GRC. Prior to the 2020 election except 1997, Tampines GRC has always been contested by the NSP (and as part of the Singapore Democratic Alliance in 2001 and 2006), including 2011 where PPP's chief Goh Meng Seng (then-NSP chief) led his team.) NSP secretary-general Spencer Ng also criticised the WP for a lack of opposition unity, saying that such a unity had become "close to impossible". Singapore People's Party (SPP) secretary-general Steve Chia expressed disappointment for voters in Marine Parade–Braddell Heights GRC, saying, "Every constituency benefits from active competition, since it fosters greater accountability." On the other hand, SDP chairperson Paul Tambyah and PSP secretary-general Leong Mun Wai respected the decision to pull out of Marine Parade–Braddell Heights GRC, given that the WP had previously contested Marine Parade GRC in the past two elections; it was also added that the opposition would have to work on future electoral strategies. Singh rebutted the criticisms the next day, insisting that the lineup had always been planned.

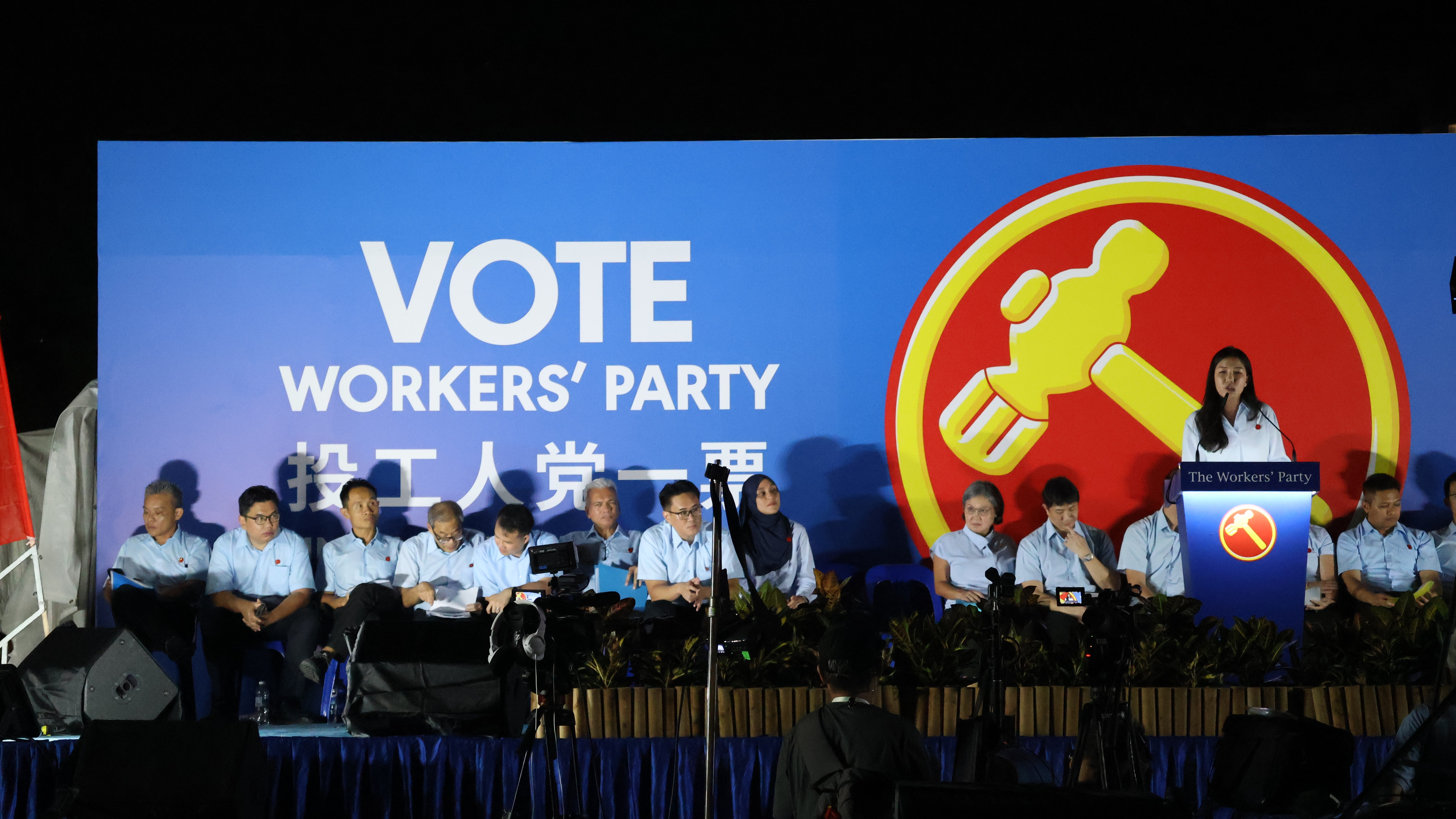
WP rally for Sengkang GRC on 24 April.

According to Ang Qing and Kok Yufeng, the first WP rally on 24 April emphasised that political competition and diverse perspectives were important, with former NCMP Yee Jenn Jong warning that the PAP sought to preserve its political dominance. Singh also urged voters to support the WP despite global uncertainties, arguing that the WP had proven itself as a "force for good" during crises like the COVID-19 pandemic. He emphasised that a stronger WP presence in Parliament would contribute to a more rational and responsive political landscape. In response to a statement by Wong of a sizeable opposition already existing in Parliament, Singh emphasised a differing view – that one-third of Parliament should consist of opposition MPs – and argued that voters should compare PAP and WP backbenchers fairly. On his first PBB on 25 April, Singh said that having the WP win more constituencies was vital for the future of Singapore's democracy. He said that having more WP-held constituencies would increase the likelihood of maintaining a fully elected opposition presence in Parliament over the long term, which would strengthen the stability and sustainability of Singapore's political system. On 27 April, Singh said that there was a "serious problem" in both PAP processes and the Singaporean political system if the PAP required a supermajority to govern properly. On 1 May, he also said that even if all WP candidates were elected, the PAP would still hold a significant majority, undermining concerns about weakened governance it had expressed.

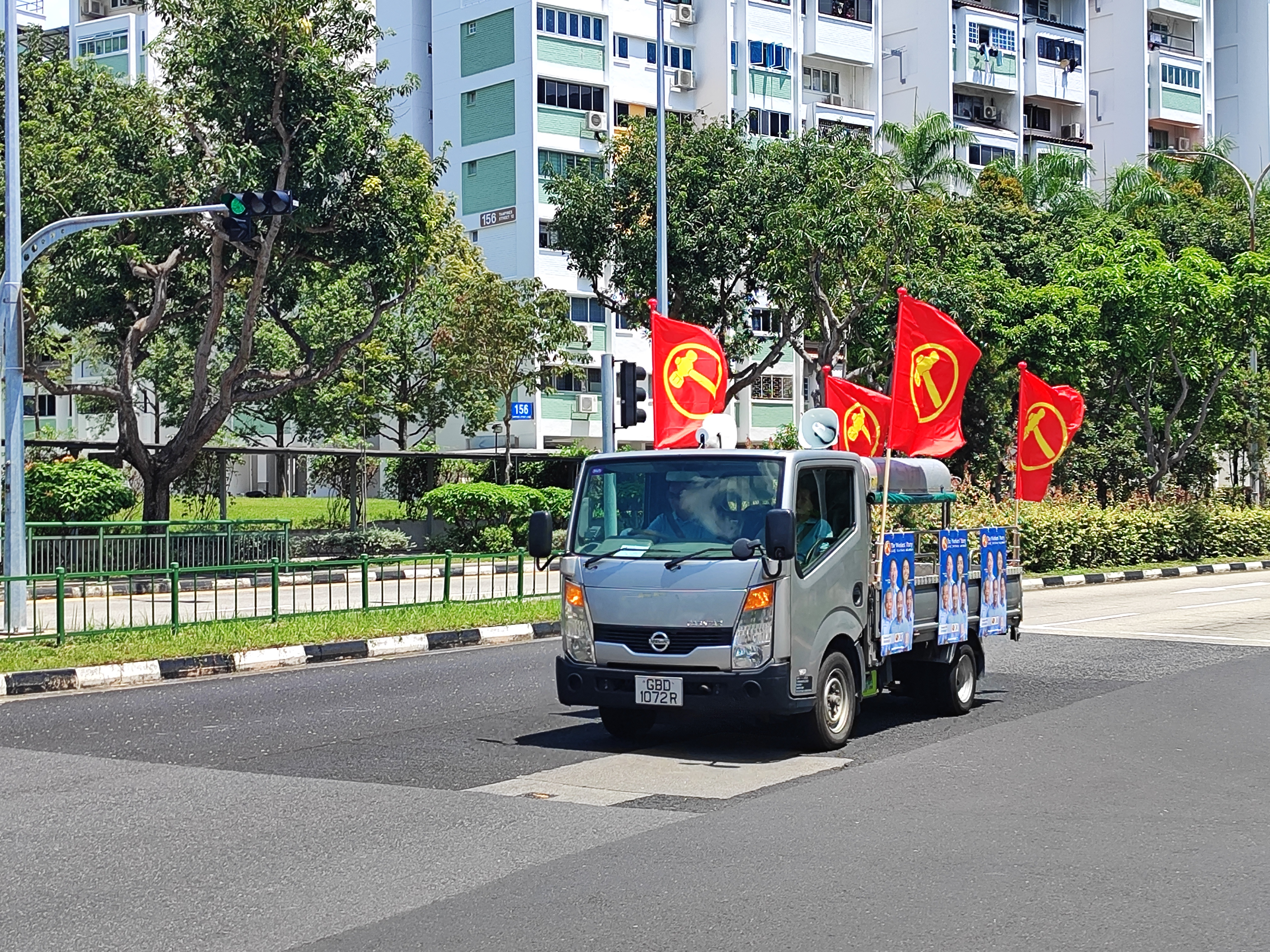
A WP perambulating vehicle in Tampines GRC

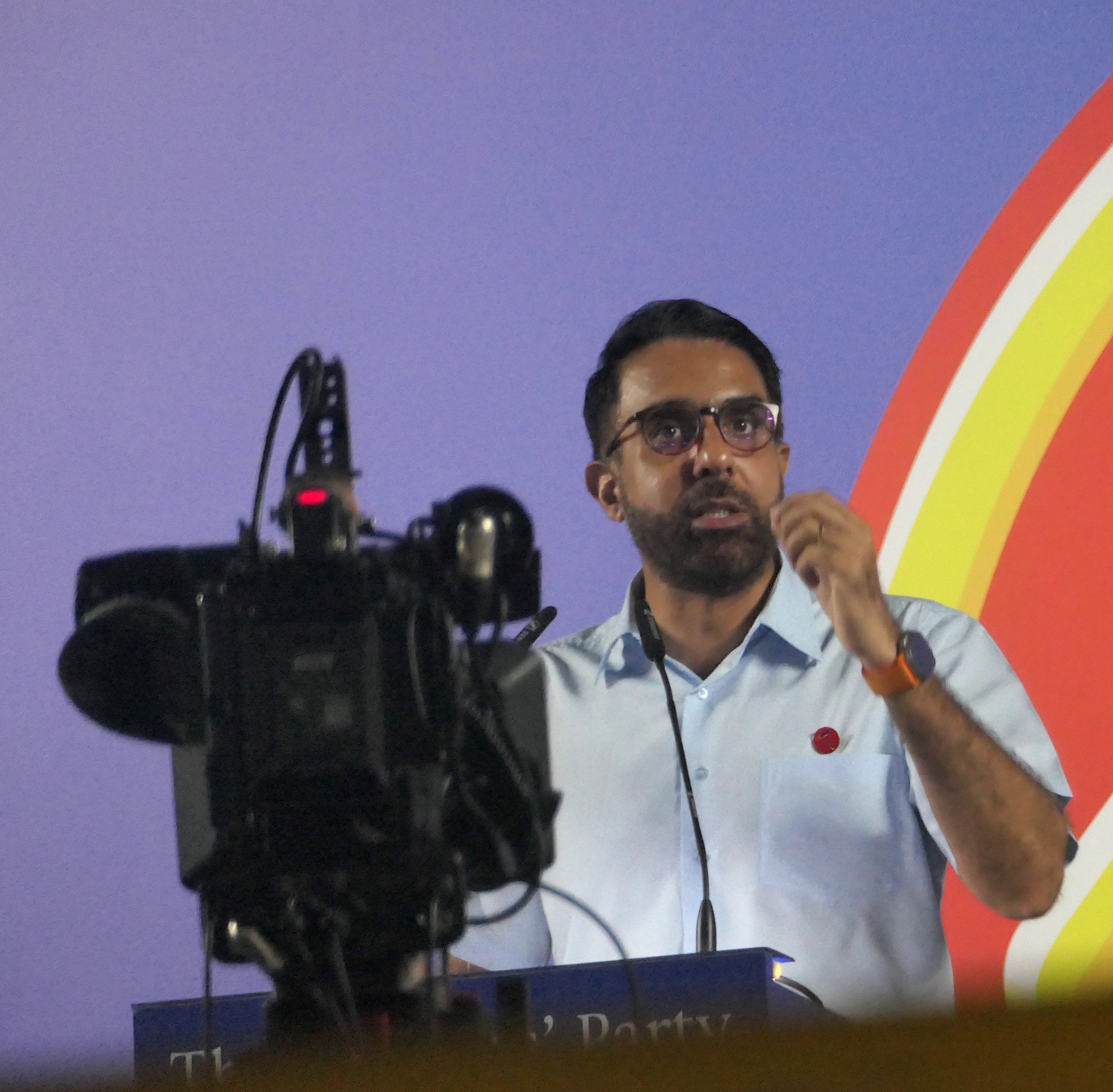
Pritam Singh addresses a campaign rally at Punggol on 28 April

At their second rally on 26 April, the WP reiterated its call for GST exemptions on essential items like cooking oil and rice, and proposed drawing more from Singapore's investment returns to address the rising cost of living. Singh also criticised PAP's manifesto for being "short on substance and specifics" and "loaded with motherhood statements". At their third rally on 28 April, while criticising the ruling party on issues such as the scrapped Income–Allianz deal and the "parachuting" of candidates into GRCs, particularly Punggol, the WP specifically targeted Gan Kim Yong and Janil Puthucheary. At the fourth rally, Singh pushed back against Wong's accusation that the WP engaged in "negative politics", asserting instead that the party had been denied access to community clubs for its events. Meanwhile, the WP team for East Coast GRC criticised the constituency's repeated gerrymandering and called on voters to counter it by electing them.

On 30 April, screenshots of Telegram messages from Andre Low, WP candidate for Jalan Kayu SMC, were leaked; they showed him using profanities while criticising the civil service and various Singaporean brands including Singtel and Secretlab, and celebrities such as Pornsak and Mark Lee; Low later apologised for the incident, calling it a "humbling experience". At their last rally at Anderson Serangoon Junior College on 1 May, WP candidates urged voters to base their decisions "on hope" instead of fear, with Sylvia Lim emphasizing the need for "conviction and hope" for a better future. Singh also criticised the GRC system for giving PAP candidates a "free pass" and stressed to "fight for every single vote", citing their narrow 2015 victory in Aljunied GRC. Low made a special appearance at the end of the rally before the recitation of the national pledge.

Jaipragas described the PAP–WP rivalry as a "clear arc", saying that it began "steadily" and "calmly" before coming to "a decisive sharpening at the midpoint". Nevertheless, he believed that the sharpened rhetoric and the absence of racial politics, fearmongering and intimidation marked a "healthy" step forward in Singapore's democratic development. ST political analysts characterised the WP's campaign strategy as ambitious yet conservative, which yielded mixed outcomes. While the WP consolidated its grip on its existing seats, it saw a decline in the contested vote share. The WP spent S$1.6 million in its campaign.

=== Progress Singapore Party ===
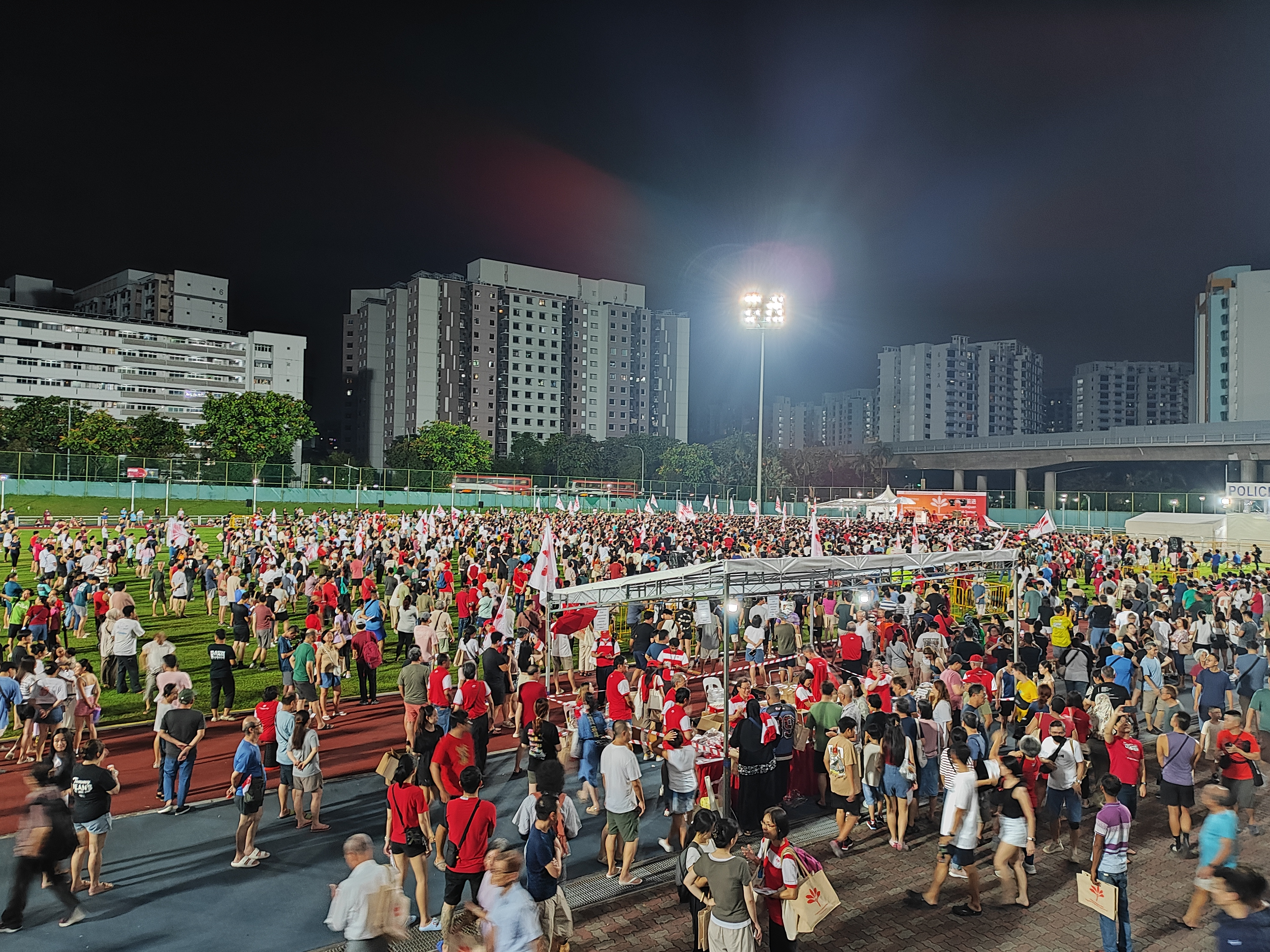
PSP rally at Pioneer SMC on 1 May 2025

On 6 April, the PSP launched its election manifesto "Progress for All", which included a call to revert the GST to 7%. Among other proposed measures to deal with the cost of living were rent guidelines for commercial properties and a cap on hawker stall rentals at S$500 or 3% of revenue. The party also proposed phasing out social enterprise hawker centres, which it called "costly". On healthcare, it called to centralise drug procurement to cut costs, and provide cash support for new mothers to cover confinement expenses. To tackle economic concerns, the party proposed to remove non-compete clauses for retrenched workers and mandate legally enforceable retrenchment benefits. It also called for shorter working hours, more paid leave and public holidays for better work-life balance, and equal parental leave for both parents. On housing, the PSP proposed replacing the existing BTO system with its Affordable Homes Scheme, which excluded land costs for a flat (Note: Public apartments (flats in British and Singaporean English) built by the Housing and Development Board (HDB).) unless it was resold. It also advocated for allowing singles aged 28 to buy BTO and resale flats, a Millennial Apartments Scheme that would offer "quality" rental flats for youths, and in-advance construction of public housing. On immigration, the PSP proposed setting company-based quotas for Employment Pass (EP) holders. It also advocated to strengthen the Fair Consideration Framework and introduce a levy on EP holders to better protect local workers and ensure fairer competition.

The PSP also confirmed that it would field 13 candidates, fewer than 24 from the previous election, due to a lack of manpower. It announced that it would compete in the SMCs of Kebun Baru, Marymount, Pioneer and Bukit Gombak, and the GRCs of Chua Chu Kang and West Coast–Jurong West. Upon the dissolution of Parliament on 15 April, the PSP declared itself "ready to be judged by voters", highlighting its parliamentary track record. On the day after nominations, Leong Mun Wai challenged Desmond Lee, the leader of the PAP team for West Coast–Jurong West GRC, to a debate about public policies; the challenge was rejected. On 30 April, Leong also asked Lee to address HDB prices and lease decay; Lee replied that Leong had made assertions with "little regards" while not mentioning problems with housing during rallies.

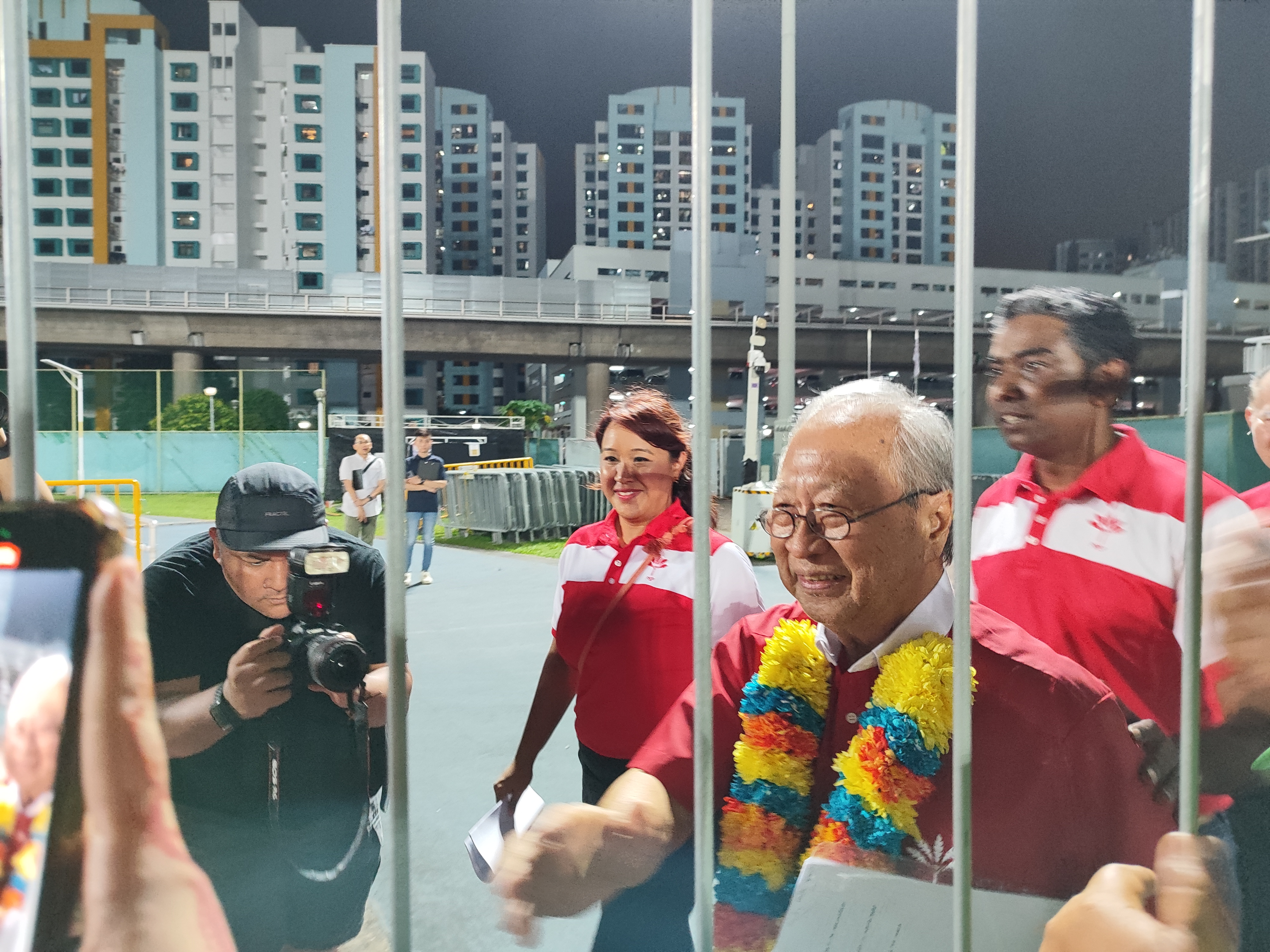
Tan Cheng Bock greeting supporters on 1 May rally at Jurong West Sports Centre.

During their first rally on 25 April, Tan and Leong claimed that the PAP's fourth generation had "lost its way", adding problems which they claimed had arisen in the previous term, citing "a general decline in the standards". Minister Tan See Leng defended the PAP against the claims and advised the PSP to "keep up closely" on their policies and current trends, and highlighted policies to further support it. During a walkabout at Teban Gardens Food Centre on 26 April, the PSP, along with SDP chair Paul Tambyah, celebrated Tan Cheng Bock's 85th birthday. At the celebration, PSP vice-chair Hazel Poa outlined the succession plans of the party leadership to its younger members.

On 30 April, the PSP urged the release of police findings behind a series of altercations before Polling Day. Despite raising the incident prior to the election, the government apparently had yet to reply. On that day, The Online Citizen (TOC) indicated that PAP grassroots volunteers supporting PAP candidate Shawn Huang had planned, via messaging, to disrupt a PSP walkabout. The attempt was reportedly cancelled after the messages became public; two messaging groups, named "TJ PAP" and "Shawn TJ Full Heart&Volunteer Community", were disbanded. Although Huang did not comment, TOC alleged that he subsequently limited his social media presence. TOC also claimed that PAP volunteers planned to disrupt a walkabout by the Singapore United Party (SUP) in Ang Mo Kio. Poa later criticised the lack of transparency surrounding said incidents, terming it "Gombakgate".

On the PSP's last rally on 1 May, to further emphasise a need of the opposition, Leong said that defeated opposition candidates were prone to "[being] lost forever" unlike their PAP counterparts, who had the ability to remain as grassroots advisors. Like the SDP and WP on their final rallies, the PSP also called for voting without fear, and recited the national pledge. The PSP spent S$441,548 in its campaign.

=== Singapore Democratic Party ===
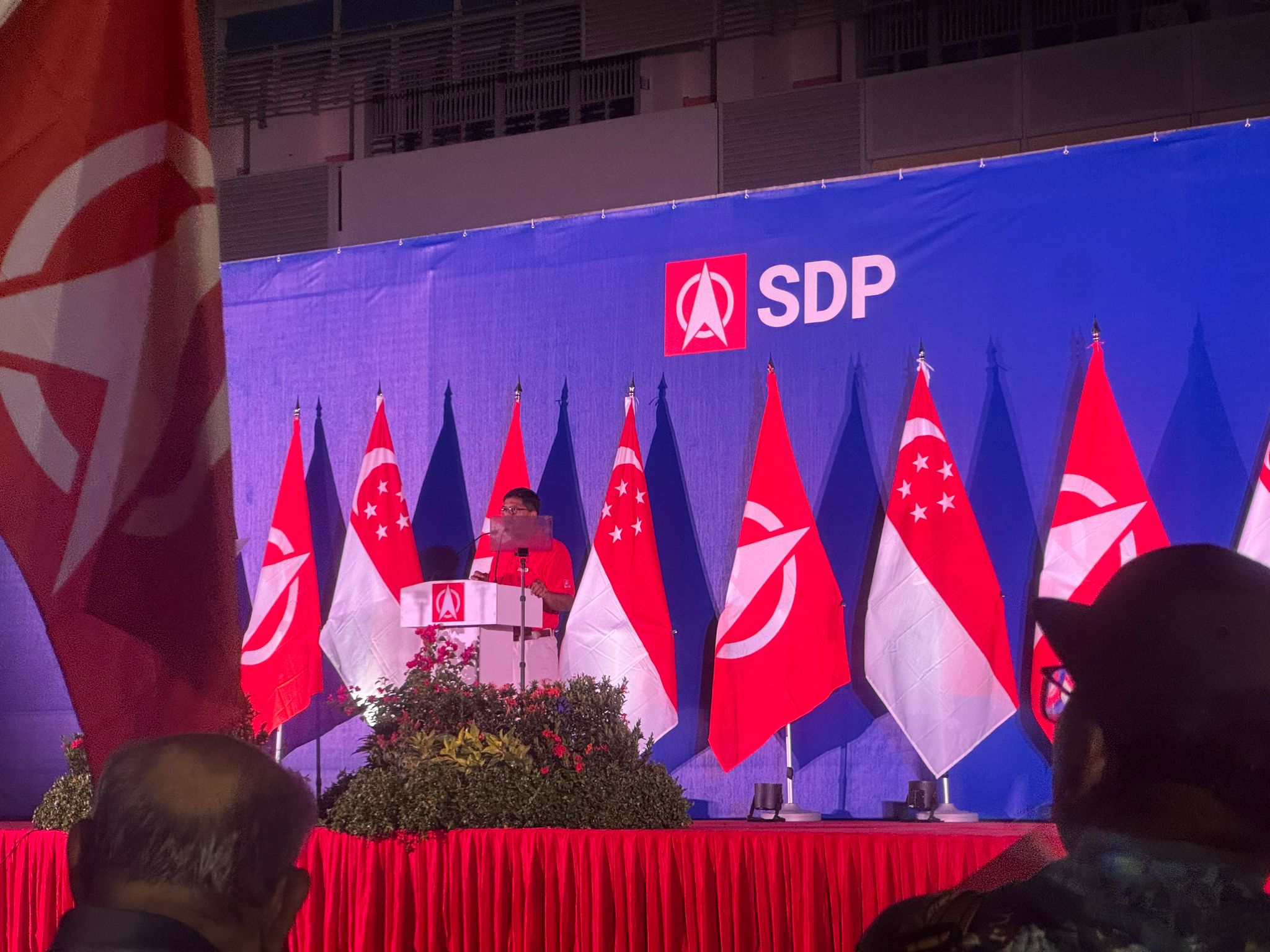
SDP rally in Bukit Panjang SMC on 25 April.

The SDP criticised the "impossibly short" schedule between the release of the Electoral Boundaries Report Committee's report and Parliament's dissolution, calling the election timing a "smash-and-grab tactic". It claimed that the PAP feared a popular backlash against the high cost of living and its "irrational immigration policy", and argued that voters required adequate time to properly assess critical issues before heading to the polls. As part of their "northern strategy", the party planned to contest in the GRCs of Sembawang, Marsiling–Yew Tee, and Holland–Bukit Timah and the SMCs of Sembawang West and Bukit Panjang. On 19 April, the SDP launched its campaign slogan, "Thrive, Not Just Survive", campaigning for the reduction of GST to 5% and the introduction of a minimum wage act. It eventually fielded 11 candidates, without contesting Holland–Bukit Timah GRC.

The SDP attacked PAP policies during rallies. After the PAP's Ong Ye Kung claimed that Chee Soon Juan, the secretary-general of the SDP, had "abandoned" Bukit Batok SMC by redeploying himself to Sembawang West SMC, Chee drew a comparison to Ong's shift to Sembawang GRC in 2015; he was part of the defeated PAP team for Aljunied GRC in 2011. On 27 April, Gigene Wong, an SDP candidate for Marsiling–Yew Tee GRC, apologised for using keling, a Hokkien racial slur used to define Tamils, against her fellow candidate Ariffin Sha (whom she also called an "elephant" and "future Pritam Singh") during the rally on the previous night. SDP later gave her a stern warning, and had every member present in the following night's rally make a joint apology.

In another rally on 29 April, Paul Tambyah refuted a comment from Ong that called SDP policies populist; they also asked for abolishments of some healthcare clusters. In its final rally on 1 May, the SDP targeted the NTUC–PAP relationship and advocated for labour workers, in response to Wong's Labour Day rally. At the end, the audience was asked to vote without fear, with the speakers reciting the national pledge. The SDP spent S$583,440 in their campaign.

=== Singapore People's Party ===
The SPP responded to the issuance of the writ of election with a Facebook statement outlining its campaign priorities and outlined its focus on "pressing concerns of Singaporeans". It also called the election an "opportunity" for citizens to articulate their policy concerns, societal aspirations, and grievances. The party planned to contest in Bishan–Toa Payoh GRC and Potong Pasir SMC. On 19 April, it launched a manifesto which called for minimum wage, a reduction of the duration of national service (NS) to 18 months and a decrease of the eligibility age for singles purchasing public housing to 30. The SPP fielded five candidates in the constituencies it had planned to contest. While the party did not host any rallies, it conducted walkabouts throughout the campaign in outreach to residents.

=== National Solidarity Party ===
Secretary-general Spencer Ng said that the NSP was "unsurprised" about the election date; however, he called it "detrimental to the spirit of democracy". It planned to contest in the GRCs of Sembawang and Tampines, as well as the SMCs formed from them (Sembawang West and Tampines Changkat) against the PAP in multi-cornered contests. On 20 April, the party confirmed that they would not contest the SMCs, but would contest both GRCs in multi-cornered contests, as they had done so in the 2020 general election. In a virtual rally on Facebook held on 29 April, NSP members said that they aimed to make Singapore a multi-party system, instead of the existing dominant-party system. It also offered policy suggestions to champion if elected. The NSP spent S$281,888 in its campaign.

=== Singapore United Party ===
The SUP planned to contest in Ang Mo Kio GRC and increased the frequency of its outreach. On Nomination Day, it fielded secretary-general Andy Zhu alongside Nigel Ng, Noraini Yunus, Chandran Sanmugam, and Vincent Ng in the GRC. Speaking to the media after the end of nominations, Zhu questioned the PPP's rationale for contesting the GRC, saying that he had walked the ground as a Reform Party (RP) candidate. Martinn Ho, a PPP member, countered that the later-founded SUP "came at the last minute"; This election was the SUP's electoral debut. On April 23, the SUP revealed their manifesto, which included implementing a price ceiling on reselling HDBs, improving the Central Provident Fund (CPF), and making healthcare more accessible.

=== Red Dot United ===
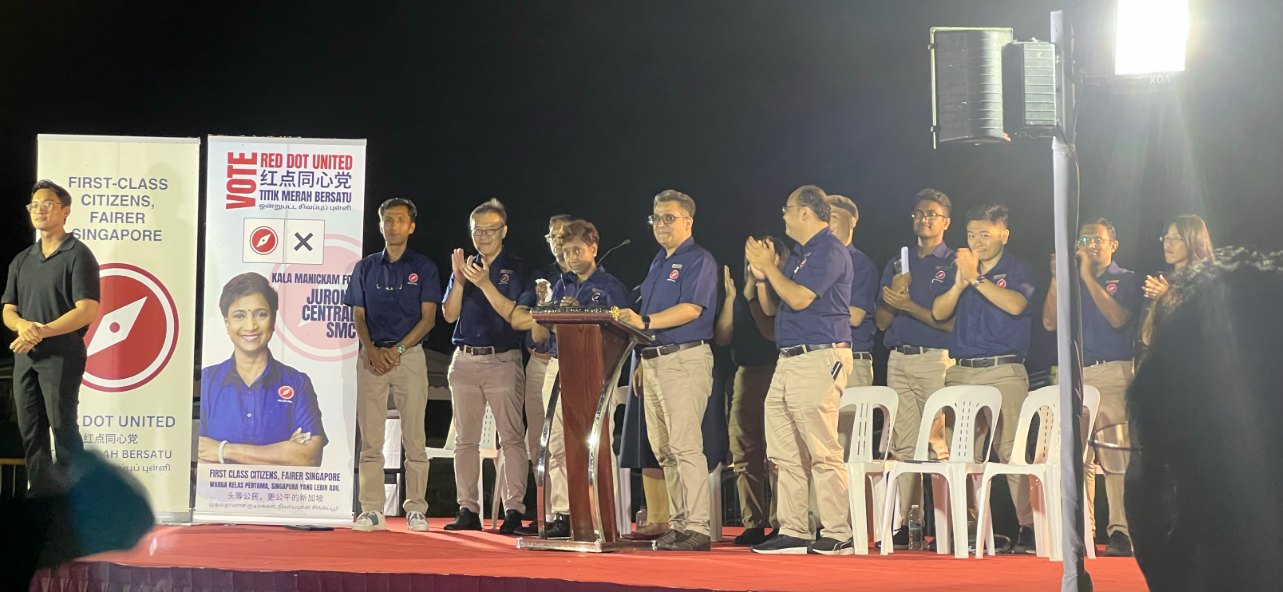
RDU candidates at a rally held in Jurong Central SMC on 30 April 2025.

Ravi Philemon, the secretary-general of RDU, criticised the election timeline as "unfair and strategically engineered to favour the ruling party"; he argued that the acceptance of nominations on 23 April, which led to a campaign period ending on 1 May, the day of the May Day rally, had no "operational reason". He noted that the timing disadvantaged opposition parties, as they became unable to respond to announcements made during the rally before 2 May, Cooling-off Day. Despite these concerns, Philemon affirmed RDU's readiness to contest the election. It intended to contest in Jurong East–Bukit Batok, Jurong Central, and Holland–Bukit Timah. On Nomination Day, RDU fielded 15 candidates to challenge in these five constituencies.

RDU tackled bread-and-butter issues, the Malay–Muslim community, and the expenditure of the Founders' Memorial on their first rally on 26 April. Members like Fazli Talip and Kala Manickam reiterated the "importance" of electing such candidates. In the 29 April episode of The Usual Podcast, hosted by The Straits Times, RDU discussed their election campaign, and how they handled online harassment against their candidate Liyana Dhamirah during campaigning. During a rally on the same day, the party focused on a comment by foreign affairs minister Vivian Balakrishnan to a post made by former NMP Calvin Cheng on pro-Palestine remarks, and a comment referencing chicken wings made by sustainability and environment minister Grace Fu in her rally speech on the previous day. The RDU spent S$204,145 in their campaign.

=== People's Power Party ===
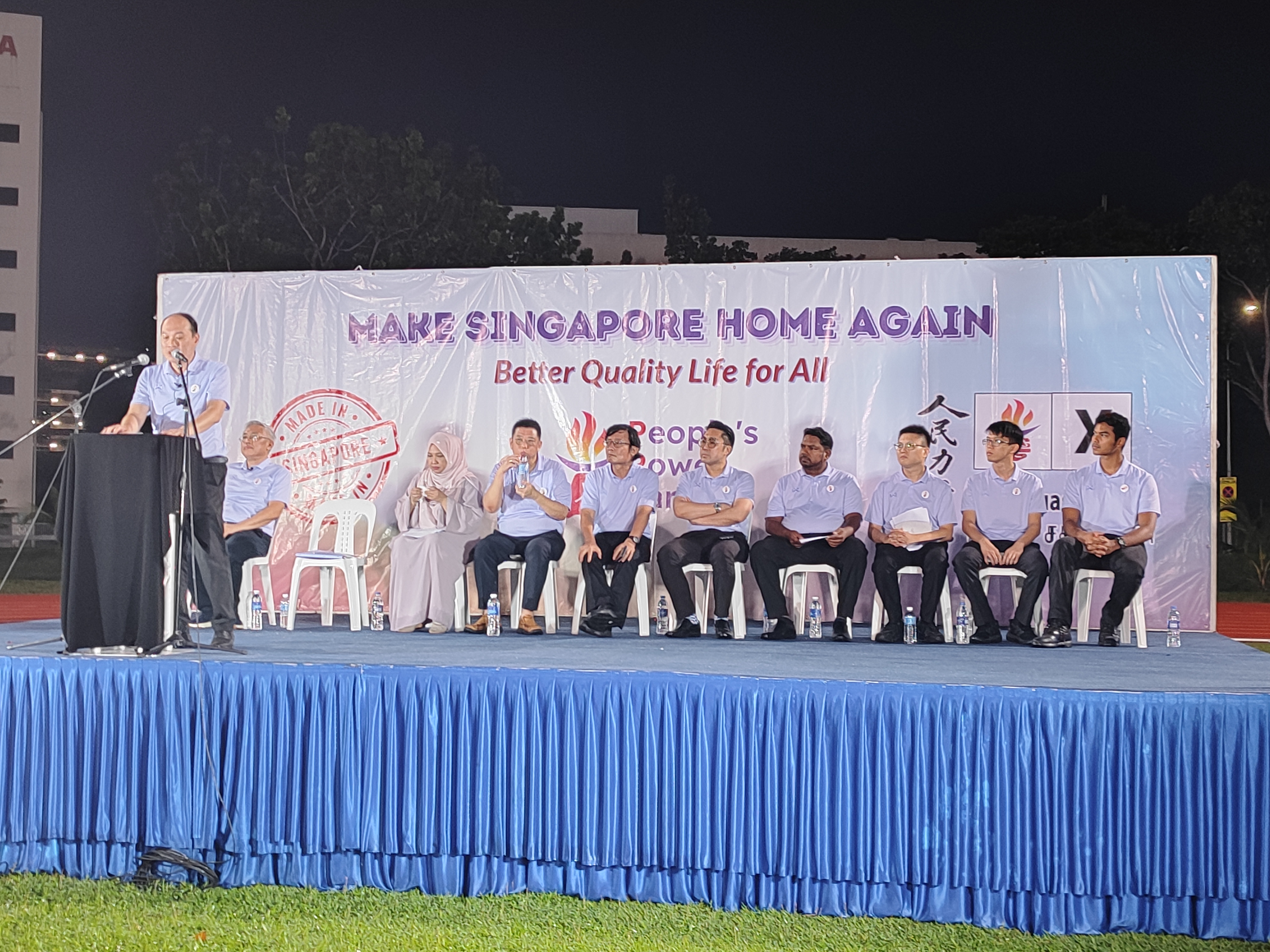
PPP candidates at a rally held at Yio Chu Kang stadium on 26 April 2025.

The PPP launched its manifesto on 4 April. It was titled "Make Singapore Home Again" and outlined tighter immigration policies, a revision of CPF contributions, and "pro-family policy proposals", such as a monthly payout for children from lower-income families. It also proposed to replace the existing first-past-the-post electoral system with proportional representation in parliamentary elections. The party expressed disappointment with the short timeframe between the issuance of the Writ of Election and Nomination Day, claiming that the PAP planned to "capitalise on the fear" of US tariffs. On 12 April, secretary-general Goh Meng Seng said that the government had "overreacted" to said tariffs and claimed that Singapore should "calmly [wait them out]" as they would be withdrawn. The PPP planned to contest in the GRCs of Tampines and Ang Mo Kio. The two constituencies totalled 10 seats, and as with the NSP, both contests had multi-cornered fights. After nominations ended, the PPP placed their election posters in the neighbouring Aljunied GRC and Tampines Changkat SMC, a violation of the prohibition on election advertising outside of constituencies a party is contesting. The party had three hours upon notice to have them removed for a waiver of removal expenses.

In the PPP's first rally on 25 April, Goh attacked Singh for "abandoning" residents of Marine Parade GRC and said that he should "be humble". Goh later claimed that he was disinterested in Singh, saying, "I'm not gay". The same day, he said that the Facebook page of Derrick Sim, the chairperson of the party, had been disabled; a police report was later filed alleging interference.

In response to public scrutiny over his road rage conviction in 2022, Samuel Lee, a PPP candidate for Ang Mo Kio GRC, apologised and appealed for public support, while Sim backed him, describing Lee as a "responsible person" with "a good heart". In the party's third rally, Goh criticised the transport system after various incidents, such as the 2024 East–West Line disruption, occurred regarding it. Treasurer William Lim also went viral for his speech on LTA enforcers, drawing an analogy to how police and firefighters did not work 24 hours a day. In the party's final rally, Goh said that he aimed to convert the method of voting in GRCs from party block voting (the general ticket) to proportional representation while criticising the PAP for recruiting civil servants and military professionals such as David Neo, a decision allegedly leading to group-thinking within the government. Having been noted for repeatedly attacking the WP throughout all PPP rallies, he also vowed to contest Marine Parade–Braddell Heights GRC in the subsequent general election, disregarding the outcome.

=== Singapore Democratic Alliance ===
Desmond Lim, the chairperson of the SDA, said that the alliance was prepared with 200 volunteers ready to serve as polling and counting agents. It planned to hold its rallies online instead of physical rallies to accommodate elderly residents. On 23 March, the alliance announced that it would contest Pasir Ris–Changi GRC and was negotiating with the WP on Punggol GRC; both had been formed from the split of Pasir Ris–Punggol GRC, an SDA stomping ground. On nomination day, the SDA decided against contesting Punggol GRC, leaving the WP to do so.

In its series of videos, the SDA highlighted key issues such as high living costs, high HDB flat prices, unaffordable healthcare, and inadequate good job opportunities, and pledged to hold the government accountable in its expenditure while ensuring that "every young family [could] afford a home". It also proposed imposing a levy on Employment Pass holders, with the money used to fund a S$1,600 base allowance for full-time national servicemen. It also reaffirmed its commitment to addressing the concerns of residents of Pasir Ris–Changi GRC, pledging to offer a "choice" representing "a different path of compassion, fairness, and a Singapore where every heart beats with hope". The SDA spent S$193,524 in its campaign.

=== People's Alliance for Reform ===
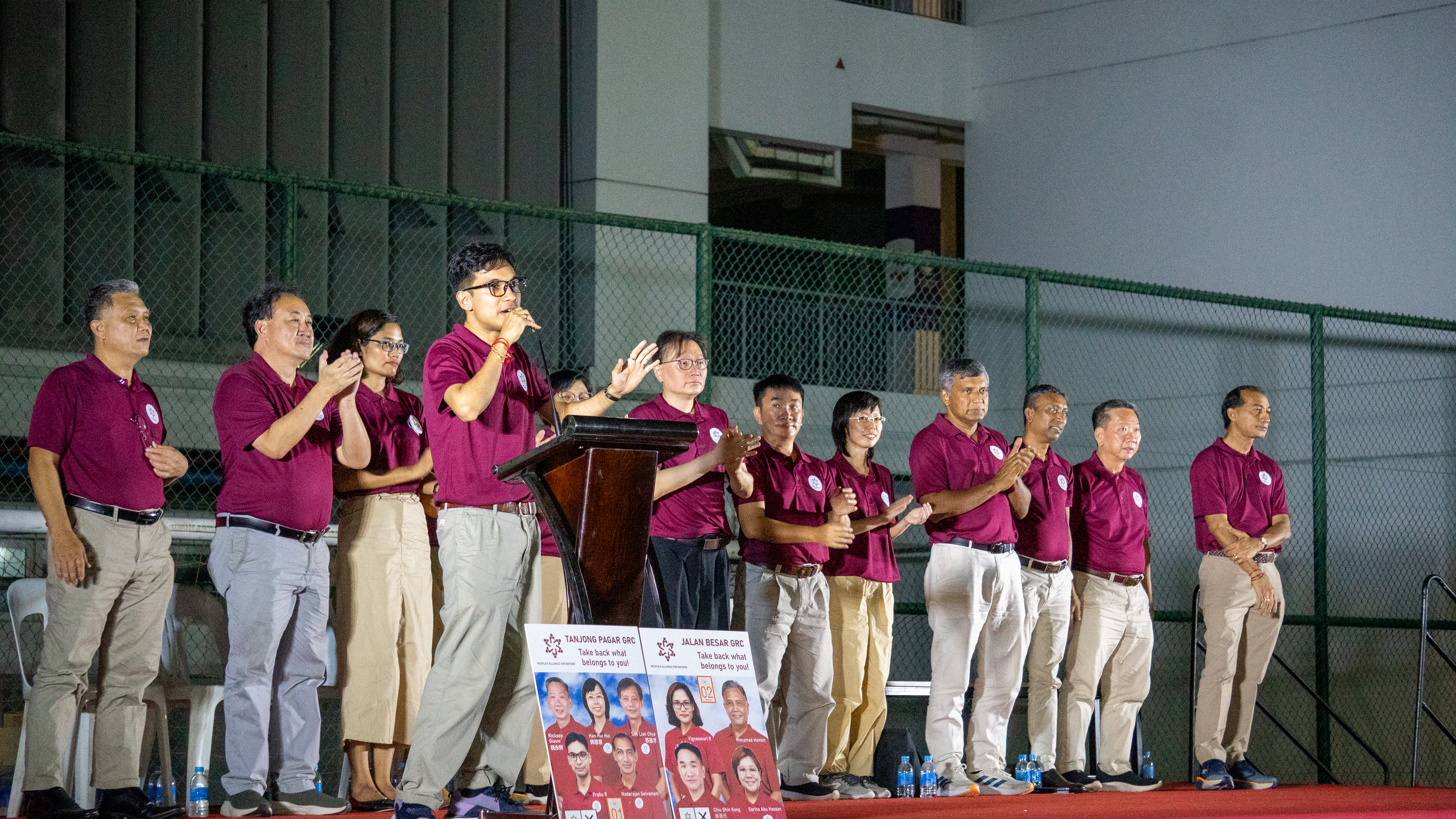
A People's Alliance for Reform rally in Jalan Besar GRC on 26 April.

Lim Tean, the secretary-general of the PAR, issued a statement endorsing the announcement of the general election and affirmed the PAR's readiness to contest. During a walkabout in Potong Pasir SMC on 16 April, he also stated that the PAR would seek free education, healthcare and school meals for all Singaporean children if they were to be elected. The PAR planned to contest in the GRCs of Jalan Besar and Tanjong Pagar, and the SMCs of Mountbatten, Potong Pasir, Queenstown, Radin Mas, and Yio Chu Kang. It eventually contested 13 seats, with Lim himself contesting Potong Pasir SMC against the SPP and PAP. However, it did not contest Mountbatten SMC.

In his PPB statement, Lim said that the PAR had solutions to lower living costs and restore affordable housing, adding that Singaporeans sought "meaningful" solutions, not handouts, and rejected a future worse than previous generations. Though he did not explain how the alliance's policies would be funded, he claimed that Singapore had enough money to support them without raising taxes or using reserves. At a 26 April rally, Lim urged Singaporeans to vote for opposition candidates to challenge "unjust PAP policies", pledging to fight like "a tiger and a lion" in Parliament on issues like living costs, housing, jobs, and immigration. He also criticised the Founders' Memorial, a "bloated civil service", and "empty" Mass Rapid Transit stations as wasteful spending. Other PAR candidates at the rally proposed rent control and freezing land costs to address living costs. The PAR held its final rally on 1 May through Facebook.

=== Independent candidates ===
==== Jeremy Tan ====
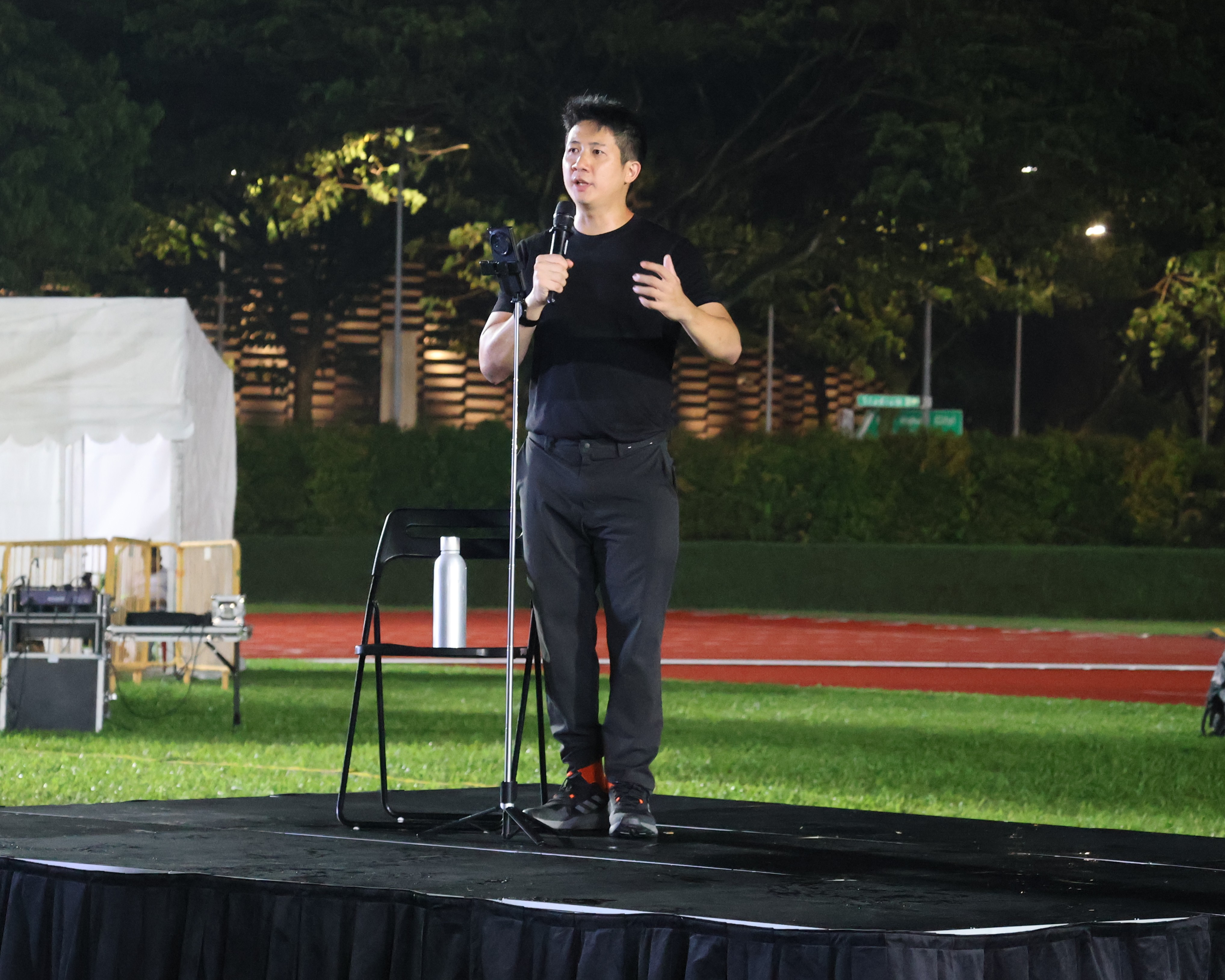
Independent candidate Jeremy Tan hosting a rally in Mountbatten SMC on 1 May.

Two independent candidates ran in the election. Jeremy Tan, candidate for Mountbatten SMC and retired Bitcoin investor, campaigned on investment in Bitcoin, the end of the use of HDB flats as retirement assets, and the introduction of a SGD-denominated Bitcoin exchange-traded fund to protect Singaporeans' savings. His opponent, PAP candidate Gho Sze Kee, criticised his policies as "impractical" and called Bitcoin a "wildly volatile" product. She added that the PAP "[did] not believe in gambling". Tan hosted his only rally throughout the campaign period on the final day, where he called for Gho to disestablish the Singapore Pools branch in Mountbatten in response to her remarks. He also cited Temasek's past cryptocurrency investments, including its US$275 million write-down in FTX and a US$200 million funding round for Amber Group, noting its stake in Bitcoin-exposed asset manager BlackRock.

==== Darryl Lo ====
Darryl Lo, the other independent candidate who was contesting Radin Mas SMC, did not host any physical rallies. Instead, he planned to reach voters by distributing 15,000 flyers and putting up 200 posters with the help of 12 volunteers. While admitting his lack of political presence, Lo said that he chose to run in Radin Mas SMC as there was no "credible opposition" in the constituency. He also promised to advocate for tougher penalties for drink driving, and to help more low-income families in the constituency qualify for the financial assistance scheme of the Ministry of Education (MOE). In addition, he supported allowing singles aged 21 and above to purchase HDB flats. Lo also rejected donations, saying that he wanted to rely solely on his own efforts and stand on his own merits. Despite originally intending to speak at Tan's rally on 1 May, Lo later realised that two independents contesting in different constituencies could not both speak at a rally. He instead appeared there to meet with the audience.
