= Electoral boundary changes of the 2020 Singaporean general election =

The Electoral Boundaries Review Committee (EBRC), which reviews and updates the Singaporean electoral map before every general election, was convened on 1 August 2019 for the 2020 general election. The EBRC released their report on 13 March 2020, which called for the creation of 17 group representation constituencies (GRCs) and 14 single-member constituencies (SMCs). This increased the number of elected Members of Parliament (MP) in the next parliament by four seats, with a total of 93.

The report introduced four SMCs: Kebun Baru, Marymount, Punggol West and Yio Chu Kang. Three of the Single Member constituencies, Fengshan, Punggol East and Sengkang West were absorbed into neighbouring GRCs. In the GRCs, a new four-member Sengkang GRC was created; for the first time since the 1997 general election, six-member GRCs ceased to exist as the two former six-member constituencies, Ang Mo Kio and Pasir Ris-Punggol, had downsized to five seats. The former four-seat GRCs of East Coast and West Coast GRCs were upsized back to five seats. Two SMCs, Hong Kah North and Potong Pasir had some of its boundaries redrawn into the neighbouring constituencies.

A total of 12 constituencies, four GRCs (Aljunied, Holland-Bukit Timah, Jurong and Tanjong Pagar) and eight SMCs (Bukit Batok, Bukit Panjang, Hougang, MacPherson, Mountbatten, Pioneer, Radin Mas and Yuhua) were left untouched in the redistricting cycle.

== History ==
=== Background ===
The electoral divisions in Singapore are organised into single-member constituencies (SMCs) and group representation constituencies (GRCs). Each SMC returns one Member of Parliament (MP) using the first past the post voting system, while each GRC returns four or five MPs by party block voting. At least one candidate in the GRC must be from the Malay, Indian or other minority communities. A group of candidates intending to contest an election in a GRC must all be members of the same political party, or a group of independent candidates. Elections are conducted by the Elections Department (ELD), a department under the Prime Minister's Office.

Before elections could be called, the Electoral Boundaries Review Committee (EBRC) had to be convened. The EBRC evaluates the existing electoral boundaries and recommends adjustments based on changes in the electorate such as population shifts and housing developments. Trade and Industry Minister Chan Chun Seng revealed on a Parliament speaking on 7 October through a written reply by Pritam Singh that the EBRC has been convened on 1 August 2019. The EBRC, under the Prime Minister Lee Hsien Loong's advice, requested for a size reduction of GRCs and increase the number of SMCs. The EBRC has often been accused by oppositions of gerrymandering as a mean to disadvantage the opposition.

The EBRC was convened on 1 August 2019 for the 2020 general election. The five members who oversees this process includes the chairperson Tan Kee Yong, secretary Koh Siong Ling, and members Cheong Koon Hean, Tan Boon Khai and Wong Wee Kim.

=== Report release ===
The EBRC released their report on 13 March, which called for the creation of 17 GRCs and 14 SMCs. The number of seats to return in the 14th Parliament of Singapore has been increased to 93, up by four seats from the precedent.

The four new SMCs were introduced in this election: Kebun Baru and Yio Chu Kang returned to being SMCs after their last appearances in the 1988 and 2006 elections respectively, having being carved out from the Nee Soon and Ang Mo Kio GRCs. Two new SMCs were also created carving out from the Bishan-Toa Payoh and Pasir Ris-Punggol GRCs respectively, which were Marymount and Punggol West. The sizes of both GRCs, as well as Ang Mo Kio, were reduced its size by one.

Three SMCs had been dissolved into neighbouring GRCs. Fengshan was absorbed into East Coast, giving back that GRC a five-seat size. Both Punggol East and the Anchorvale parts of Sengkang West SMC, alongside the Sengkang Central division of Pasir Ris-Punggol GRC, forms the new Sengkang GRC, with Fernvale from the latter constituency being absorbed into Ang Mo Kio GRC instead.

Former four-member West Coast GRC was upsized to five seats due to population growth in the Jurong West regions, which took in the Nanyang division from the Chua Chu Kang GRC and Hong Kah North SMC. The Bidadari area's expansion has also led to the redrawing of Potong Pasir for the first time in the constituency's existence, carving out the eastern portion of Toa Payoh to Bishan-Toa Payoh GRC. Tampines GRC had its boundaries changed for the first time since 2001, albeit minor, as it taken the boundaries of the Tampines North Industrial Park from Pasir Ris-Punggol GRC. Likewise, the population growth of Simpang and Novena also saw these areas redistricted to Nee Soon and Jalan Besar GRCs respectively, to even the electorate for both.

The election has no six-member GRCs for the first time since its first appearance in 1997. There were no boundary changes for four GRCs (Aljunied, Holland-Bukit Timah, Jurong and Tanjong Pagar) and eight SMCs (Bukit Batok, Bukit Panjang, Hougang, MacPherson, Mountbatten, Pioneer, Radin Mas and Yuhua).

== Main changes ==
Electoral boundary changes between 2015 and 2020

2015 electoral boundaries

2020 electoral boundaries

The changes made in the electoral divisions are as follows:

Name of GRC	Changes
Ang Mo Kio GRC	Ward downsized to five members Absorbed western portions and Fernvale area of Sengkang West SMC (forming Fernvale); Carved out Yio Chu Kang division into SMC; Merged Sengkang South portions to Ang Mo Kio-Hougang and Fernvale divisions
Bishan–Toa Payoh GRC	Ward downsized to four members Carved out eastern portion Bishan North division and Shunfu portion of Bishan East-Thomson division into SMC, and Novena and Balestier to Jalan Besar GRC; Absorbed Toa Payoh portion from Potong Pasir SMC; Western Sin Ming from Bishan North absorbed into Bishan East-Thomson division
Chua Chu Kang GRC	Carved out southernmost part Nanyang division to West Coast GRC and portions of Tengah New Town into Hong Kah North SMC, while the remaining parts of Nanyang division and carved out parts of Bukit Gombak, Keat Hong and Chua Chu Kang forming into Brickland division
East Coast GRC	Ward upsized to five members Absorbed Fengshan SMC
Jalan Besar GRC	Absorbed portions of Novena and Balestier portion from Bishan–Toa Payoh GRC
Marine Parade GRC	Carved out a major portion of Bidadari into Potong Pasir SMC
Marsiling–Yew Tee GRC	Absorbed portions of Woodlands and Innova from Sembawang GRC
Nee Soon GRC	Carved out Kebun Baru division into SMC; Absorbed portions of Simpang and Yishun from Sembawang GRC forming Yishun Link division
Pasir Ris–Punggol GRC	Ward downsized to five members Carved out most of Punggol West division into SMC while remaining absorbed to Punggol Coast, Sengkang Central division to Sengkang GRC, and Tampines Retail Park areas and southern Pasir Ris to Tampines GRC; Split the central part of Pasir Ris West into Pasir Ris Central division.
Sembawang GRC	Carved out Woodlands and a few parts of Innova to Marsiling–Yew Tee GRC, and portions of Simpang and Yishun to Nee Soon GRC; Eastern portions of Sembawang and Gambas formed into Sembawang Central while western Sembawang and portions of Woodlands Central became Sembawang West division
Sengkang GRC	New Constituency; Formed from Punggol East SMC, eastern portion (Anchorvale) of Sengkang West SMC, and Sengkang Central from Pasir Ris–Punggol GRC. Sengkang Central was split into Compassvale (Formed from northern portion of Sengkang Central) and Buangkok (formed from southern half of Sengkang Central and a small part of Punggol East SMC)
Tampines GRC	Absorbed Tampines Retail Park areas from Pasir Ris–Punggol GRC
West Coast GRC	Ward upsized to five members Absorbed portions of Nanyang from Chua Chu Kang GRC. Jurong West portion of Hong Kah North SMC merged with Ayer Rajah, forming Ayer Rajah-Gek Poh division

== See also ==
- List of defunct electoral divisions of Singapore
