= Sun Xueling =

Singaporean politician (born 1979)

The Honourable Sun Xueling
- 孙雪玲
- Sun in 2026

Member of the Singapore Parliament for Punggol GRC
- Incumbent
- Assumed office 4 May 2025
- Preceded by: Constituency established
- Majority: 11,956 (10.34%)

Member of the Singapore Parliament for Punggol West SMC
- In office 10 July 2020 – 15 April 2025
- Preceded by: Constituency established
- Succeeded by: Constituency abolished
- Majority: 5,638 (21.96%)

Member of the Singapore Parliament for Pasir Ris–Punggol GRC
- In office 11 September 2015 – 23 June 2020
- Preceded by: PAP held
- Succeeded by: PAP held
- Majority: 78,513 (45.78%)

Personal details
- Born: Soon Sher Rene; 10 July 1979 (age 47) Singapore
- Party: People's Action Party
- Children: 2
- Education: National University of Singapore (BSS); London School of Economics (MS)

Sun Xueling (Note: Chinese: 孙雪玲; pinyin: Sūn Xuělíng) (born Soon Sher Rene; 10 July 1979) is a Singaporean politician who has been serving as Senior Minister of State for Transport and Senior Minister of State for National Development since 2025. A member of the governing People's Action Party (PAP), she has been the Member of Parliament (MP) for the Punggol West division of Punggol Group Representation Constituency (GRC) since 2025. She had previously represented the Punggol West division of Pasir Ris–Punggol GRC between 2015 and 2020 and Punggol West Single Member Constituency (SMC) between 2020 and 2025.

Prior to entering politics, Sun had worked at the Economic Development Board, DBS Bank, Temasek International, Deutsche Bank AG and Macquarie Securities.

She made her political debut in the 2015 general election as part of a six-member PAP team contesting in Pasir Ris–Punggol GRC and won 72.89% of the vote. She had previously served as Minister of State for Education between 2020 and 2022. She served as Senior Parliamentary Secretary for Home Affairs and Senior Parliamentary Secretary for National Development concurrently between 2018 and 2020.

== Early life and education ==
Sun was brought up mostly by her grandmother, who was widowed at the age of 33 with six children, as Sun's parents were both busy in their full-time jobs. She grew up in a flat in Clementi with her younger sister before moving to Ang Mo Kio.

She then went on to Ai Tong Primary before continuing her secondary school education at CHIJ St Nicholas Girls' School. Having been encouraged by her grandmother to help the needy, she started doing volunteering work in 2001, while she was studying at the National University of Singapore, from which she graduated with a Bachelor of Social Sciences degree in economics. She subsequently went on to complete a Master of Science with merit degree in international political economy at the London School of Economics.

== Career ==
Sun started her career in the Economic Development Board (EDB) in 2003 before she joined DBS Bank as an Assistant Vice President. She was Director of Investment Groups at Temasek Holdings and had spent eight years based in Hong Kong and China working for Deutsche Bank AG as a Director and later Macquarie Securities as a Senior Vice President. She was also Chief Executive Officer of Business China from 1 November 2015 to 20 May 2018.

=== Political career ===
Sun was introduced by the People's Action Party (PAP) as a candidate contesting in Pasir Ris–Punggol GRC on 1 August 2015 in the lead-up to the 2015 general election. Before her candidacy was announced, she had been active in grassroots activities in Buona Vista since 2001 and had been advocating women's and mothers' rights.

During the campaigning period for the 2015 general election, Sun was the target of xenophobic comments online because her name in hanyu pinyin misled people into thinking that she was a Chinese national.

Sun became a Member of Parliament representing the Punggol West ward of Pasir Ris–Punggol GRC after the six-member PAP team won 72.89% of the vote against the Singapore Democratic Alliance (SDA). On 1 May 2018, Sun was appointed Senior Parliamentary Secretary at the Ministry of Home Affairs and Ministry of National Development.

During the 2020 general election, Sun contested as the PAP candidate in Punggol West SMC after it was carved out from Pasir Ris–Punggol GRC. She won with 60.98% of the vote against Tan Chen Chen from the Workers' Party (WP). On 27 July 2020, she was promoted to Minister of State and appointed to the Ministry of Social and Family Development and Ministry of Education. On 13 June 2022, Sun was appointed Minister of State at the Ministry of Home Affairs and relinquished the Education portfolio.

In 2025, Sun contested in the new Punggol GRC after it was created by merging Punggol West SMC with the Punggol section of Pasir Ris–Punggol GRC as part of a four-member PAP team. The PAP proceeded to defeat the WP with 55.17% of the vote. Sun has served as the Chairman of the Punggol Town Council since 2025.

== Personal life ==
Sun is married to an information technology entrepreneur who was born in Beijing and subsequently became a Singapore citizen in 2009. They have two daughters together.

== Notes ==
Parliament of Singapore
Preceded by Zainal bin Sapari; Teo Chee Hean; Penny Low; Gan Thiam Poh; Teo Ser Luck; Janil Puthucheary	Member of Parliament for Pasir Ris–Punggol GRC; 2015–2020; Served alongside: Zainal bin Sapari, Teo Chee Hean, Ng Chee Meng, Teo Ser Luck, Janil Puthucheary	Succeeded by Sharael Taha; Desmond Tan; Teo Chee Hean; Yeo Wan Ling; Janil Puthucheary
New constituency	Member of Parliament for Punggol West SMC; 2020–2025	Constituency abolished
New constituency	Member of Parliament for Punggol GRC; 2025–present Served alongside: Janil Puthucheary, Gan Kim Yong, Yeo Wan Ling	Incumbent
