= Janil Puthucheary =

Singaporean politician and paediatrician (born 1972)

The Honourable Janil Puthucheary
- ജനില പുതുച്ചേരി
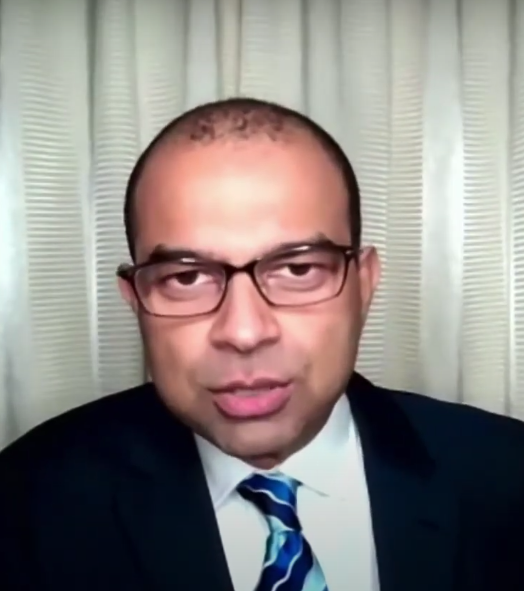
- Puthucheary in 2022

Party Whip of the People's Action Party
- Incumbent
- Assumed office 6 June 2019
- Prime Minister: Lee Hsien Loong; Lawrence Wong
- Deputy: Zaqy Mohamad; Sim Ann
- Preceded by: Chan Chun Sing

Member of the Singapore Parliament for Punggol GRC
- Incumbent
- Assumed office 3 May 2025
- Preceded by: Constituency established
- Majority: 11,956 (10.34%)

Member of the Singapore Parliament for Pasir Ris–Punggol GRC
- In office 7 May 2011 – 15 April 2025
- Preceded by: Constituency established
- Succeeded by: Constituency abolished
- Majority: 2011: 45,892 (29.58%); 2015: 78,513 (45.78%); 2020: 63,605 (40.49%)

Personal details
- Born: Janil Arusha Puthucheary; 6 November 1972 (age 53) Kuala Lumpur, Malaysia
- Party: People's Action Party
- Spouse: Michelle Jong
- Children: 3
- Education: Queen's University, Belfast
- Occupation: Politician; paediatrician

Janil Arusha Puthucheary (Note: Malayalam: ജനില അരുഷ പുതുച്ചേരി, romanized: Janil Aruṣa Putuccēri) (born 6 November 1972) is a Malaysian-born Singaporean politician and paediatrician. A member of the governing People's Action Party (PAP), he has been serving as Senior Minister of State for Sustainability and the Environment and Senior Minister of State for Education since 2025. He has also been serving as Party Whip of the People's Action Party since 2019. He has been the Member of Parliament (MP) representing the Punggol Coast division since 2015, as part of Pasir Ris–Punggol Group Representation Constituency until 2025 and as part of Punggol Group Representation Constituency since 2025.

Born in Malaysia, Puthucheary had worked as a paediatrician at hospitals in the United Kingdom, Australia and Singapore before he became a Singapore citizen in 2008. He made his political debut in the 2011 general election as part of a six-member PAP team contesting in Pasir Ris–Punggol GRC, and won 64.79% of the vote. Puthucheary was elected as the Member of Parliament representing the Punggol West ward of Pasir Ris–Punggol GRC.

He has since retained his parliamentary seat in the subsequent general elections, however, he switched to representing the Punggol Coast ward after the 2015 general election. Additionally, he has served as Minister of State and later Senior Minister of State at the Ministries of Communication and Information (2016–2017, 2020–present), Education (2016–2018), Transport (2018–2020), and Health (2020–present). He is chairman of the PAP youth wing.

== Education ==
Puthucheary attended primary school in Kuala Lumpur before going to Oundle School in Northamptonshire for his secondary education.

He completed his training as a paediatrician at Queen's University Belfast and the Royal College of Physicians.

== Career ==
Puthucheary worked at hospitals in Belfast, London and Sydney before he moved to Singapore in 2001 to work at KK Women's and Children's Hospital as a Senior Consultant at the children's intensive care unit. In 2007, he became an Assistant Professor and Medical Director for Faculty Development at the Duke-NUS Graduate Medical School.

=== Political career ===
Puthucheary made his political debut in the 2011 general election when he joined a six-member PAP team contesting in Pasir Ris–Punggol GRC. After his candidacy was announced, he attracted attention as he had not served National Service (NS) as new citizens are not required to. He was also compared with Chen Show Mao, a Taiwanese-born Workers' Party (WP) candidate who had served NS as a second generation permanent resident (PR). In response, Puthucheary said that he had spent the "past ten years saving children's lives." Low Thia Khiang, the WP chief, called for an amendment to the Constitution to require completion of NS from male political candidates. The PAP team in Pasir Ris–Punggol GRC won with 64.79% of the vote against the Singapore Democratic Alliance. Puthucheary thus became an MP representing the Punggol West ward of Pasir Ris–Punggol GRC.

Puthucheary contested as part of a six-member PAP team in Pasir Ris–Punggol GRC in the 2015 general election and they won with 72.89% of the vote against the Singapore Democratic Alliance. On 1 January 2016, he was appointed Minister of State at the Ministry of Communications and Information and Ministry of Education. On 1 May 2017, he was promoted to Senior Minister of State at the Ministry of Education and left the Ministry of Communications and Information. On 1 May 2018, his appointments were changed to Senior Minister of State at the Ministry of Communications and Information and the Ministry of Transport. On 6 June 2019, he was appointed Government Whip.

During the 2020 general election, Puthucheary contested as part of a five-member PAP team in Pasir Ris–Punggol GRC and they won with 64.16% of the vote against the Singapore Democratic Alliance. After the election, Puthucheary switched to representing the Punggol Coast ward of Pasir Ris–Punggol GRC. On 27 July 2020, he dropped his appointment as Senior Minister of State at the Ministry of Transport while continuing to serve as Senior Minister of State at the Ministry of Communications and Information. In addition, he was appointed Senior Minister of State at the Ministry of Health. During the 2025 general election, Puthucheary was part of the newly-created Punggol GRC PAP team led by Deputy Prime Minister Gan Kim Yong. The PAP would eventually win with 55.17% of the vote against the Workers' Party team led by Harpreet Singh Nehal. Puthucheary has served as the Vice-Chairman of the Punggol Town Council since 2025.

== Personal life ==
Janil Puthucheary was born in Kuala Lumpur, Malaysia. His father, Dominic Puthucheary, was a trade unionist and founding member of the PAP who later joined the left-wing Barisan Sosialis (BS). In February 1963, Dominic was detained during Operation Coldstore as an alleged communist, exiled to Malaya, and barred from Singapore until 1990. He later served as the MP for Nibong Tebal in Penang under Gerakan (then part of Barisan Nasional) from 1990 to 1995. His uncle, James Puthucheary, was likewise a founding member of the PAP who defected to the BS and was also detained under Operation Coldstore. Born a Malaysian citizen in 1972, Puthucheary later naturalised as a Singaporean in 2008.

Because he became a citizen in his late 30s, Puthucheary did not serve National Service (NS). Following the establishment of the SAF Volunteer Corps on 13 October 2014, he enlisted with its inaugural cohort. Puthucheary is of Malayalee descent. He is married to Michelle Jong, a Senior Consultant in the Department of Endocrinology at Tan Tock Seng Hospital. They have three sons.

== Notes ==
Parliament of Singapore
Preceded by Ahmad Magad; Teo Chee Hean; Penny Low; Teo Ser Luck; Charles Chong; Michael Palmer	Member of Parliament for Pasir Ris–Punggol GRC; 2011–2025; Served alongside: (2011-2015): Zainal bin Sapari, Teo Chee Hean, Penny Low, Gan Thiam Poh, Teo Ser Luck (2015-2020): Zainal bin Sapari, Teo Chee Hean, Ng Chee Meng, Teo Ser Luck, Sun Xueling (2020-2025): Sharael Taha, Desmond Tan, Teo Chee Hean, Yeo Wan Ling	Constituency abolished
New constituency	Member of Parliament for Punggol GRC; 2025–present Served alongside: Gan Kim Yong, Yeo Wan Ling, Sun Xueling	Incumbent
Party political offices
Preceded by Chan Chun Sing	Chairman of Young PAP; 2017–present	Incumbent
