= Electoral Boundaries Review Committee =

Government body in Singapore

- 选区范围检讨委员会

Agency overview
- Formed: 1954; 72 years ago
- Jurisdiction: Government of Singapore
- Status: Dissolved (until being reconvened prior to next election)
- Minister responsible: Lawrence Wong, Prime Minister
- Agency executive: Vacant, Chairman
- Parent department: Elections Department

The Electoral Boundaries Review Committee (EBRC) is a body convened before general elections in Singapore. It decides the electoral constituencies and the redistricting of boundaries that will be used to elect Members of Parliament (MPs).

== Overview ==
The earliest mention of the EBRC, was of its predecessor the Electoral Boundaries Delineation Committee (EBDC) was in 1954 to amend the boundaries for the general election the following year. In 1988, the EBDC was renamed as the Electoral Boundaries Review Committee.

The EBRC comprises a panel of five different civil servants, all of whom expertise in each technical areas. The Secretary to Prime Minister serves as the chairperson for the EBRC, along with the CEO of the Housing & Development Board, Chief Executive of the Singapore Land Authority, Chief Statistician of the Department of Statistics, and the Head of the Elections Department. The panel is to determine the electoral boundaries for use at future elections taking into account population shifts and new housing developments, disregarding electoral results. The EBRC can also comply request by the Prime Minister of Singapore on advice about boundary delimitation, as well as the requirements for electoral divisions to have approximately equal numbers of voters so that electors' votes carry the same weight, either in Single Member or Group Representation constituencies, regardless of where they cast their ballots.

In 1963, the EBRC adopted a rule allowing the numbers of voters in divisions to differ by no more than 20%, before increasing to 30% in 1980. It is the Cabinet's discretion to accept the Committee's recommendations. The EBRC is convened and published its new boundaries within months before a parliamentary general election may be called. In each drawings, some constituencies may be left intact while others may be redrawn into neighbouring constituencies or GRCs. Since the third millennium, while most GRCs were subjected to redistricting changes, however, between two and five GRCs were left intact in each of the redistricting cycle.

== Constituency Boundary Changes since 1954 ==
Figures of the electorate reflected are based on the latest changes of the electorate rolls prior to the election. Electoral figures used in the presidential elections or a referendum (highlighted) are listed, but not from by-elections.

Year	Date of		Constituencies					Electorate	Average			Source
Year	Release	Election	SMC	4G	5G	3/6G	Total	Electorate	Per seat	By GRC size	By Constituency	Source
1955	September 3, 1954	April 2, 1955	25	—N/a			25	300,199	12,008	—N/a		
1959	April 18, 1958	May 30, 1959	51	—N/a			▲51	586,098	▼11,492	—N/a		
1962	—N/a	September 1, 1962	—N/a	—N/a			—N/a	619,867	▲12,154	—N/a		
1963	Did not convey	September 21, 1963	51	—N/a			51	617,750	▼12,113	—N/a		
1968	October 31, 1967	April 13, 1968	58	—N/a			▲58	759,367	▲13,093	—N/a		
1972	October 19, 1971	September 2, 1972	65	—N/a			▲65	908,382	▲13,975	—N/a		
1976	July 25, 1976	December 23, 1976	69	—N/a			▲69	1,095,817	▲15,881	—N/a		
1980	June 26, 1980	December 23, 1980	75	—N/a			▲75	1,290,426	▲17,206	—N/a		
1984	June 30, 1984	December 12, 1984	79	—N/a			▲79	1,495,389	▲18,929	—N/a		
1988	June 14, 1988	September 3, 1988	42	0	0	13	▲81	1,669,013	▲20,605	3.00	1.47	
1991	August 8, 1991	August 31, 1991	21	15	0	0	81	1,692,384	▲20,894	▲4.00	▲2.25	
1993	—N/a	August 28, 1993	—N/a					1,756,517	▲21,685	—N/a		
1997	November 21, 1996	January 2, 1997	9	5	6	4	▲83	1,881,011	▲22,663	▲4.93	▲3.46	
1999	—N/a	August 28, 1999	—N/a					1,967,984	▲23,711	—N/a		
2001	October 17, 2001	November 3, 2001	9	0	9	5	▲84	2,036,923	▲24,249	▲5.36	▲3.65	
2005	—N/a	August 27, 2005	—N/a					2,113,540	▲25,161	—N/a		
2006	March 3, 2006	May 6, 2006	9	0	9	5	84	2,159,721	▲25,711	5.36	3.65	
May 2011	February 24, 2011	May 7, 2011	12	2	11	2	▲87	2,350,873	▲27,022	▼5.00	▼3.22	
August 2011	—N/a	August 27, 2011	—N/a					2,274,773	▼26,147	—N/a		
2015	July 24, 2015	September 11, 2015	13	6	8	2	▲89	2,462,926	▲27,673	▼4.75	▼3.09	
2017	—N/a	September 23, 2017	—N/a					2,516,608	▲28,276	—N/a		
2020	March 13, 2020	July 10, 2020	14	6	11	0	▲93	2,651,435	▲28,510	▼4.65	▼3.00	
2023	—N/a	September 1, 2023	—N/a					2,709,455	▲29,134	—N/a		
2025	March 11, 2025	May 3, 2025	15	8	10	0	▲97	2,758,846	▼28,442	▼4.56	▼2.94	
Next	TBA											

== See also ==
- Constituencies of Singapore
- List of electoral divisions and wards in Singapore
