= Yeo Wan Ling =

Singaporean politician

The Honourable Yeo Wan Ling
- 杨涴淩
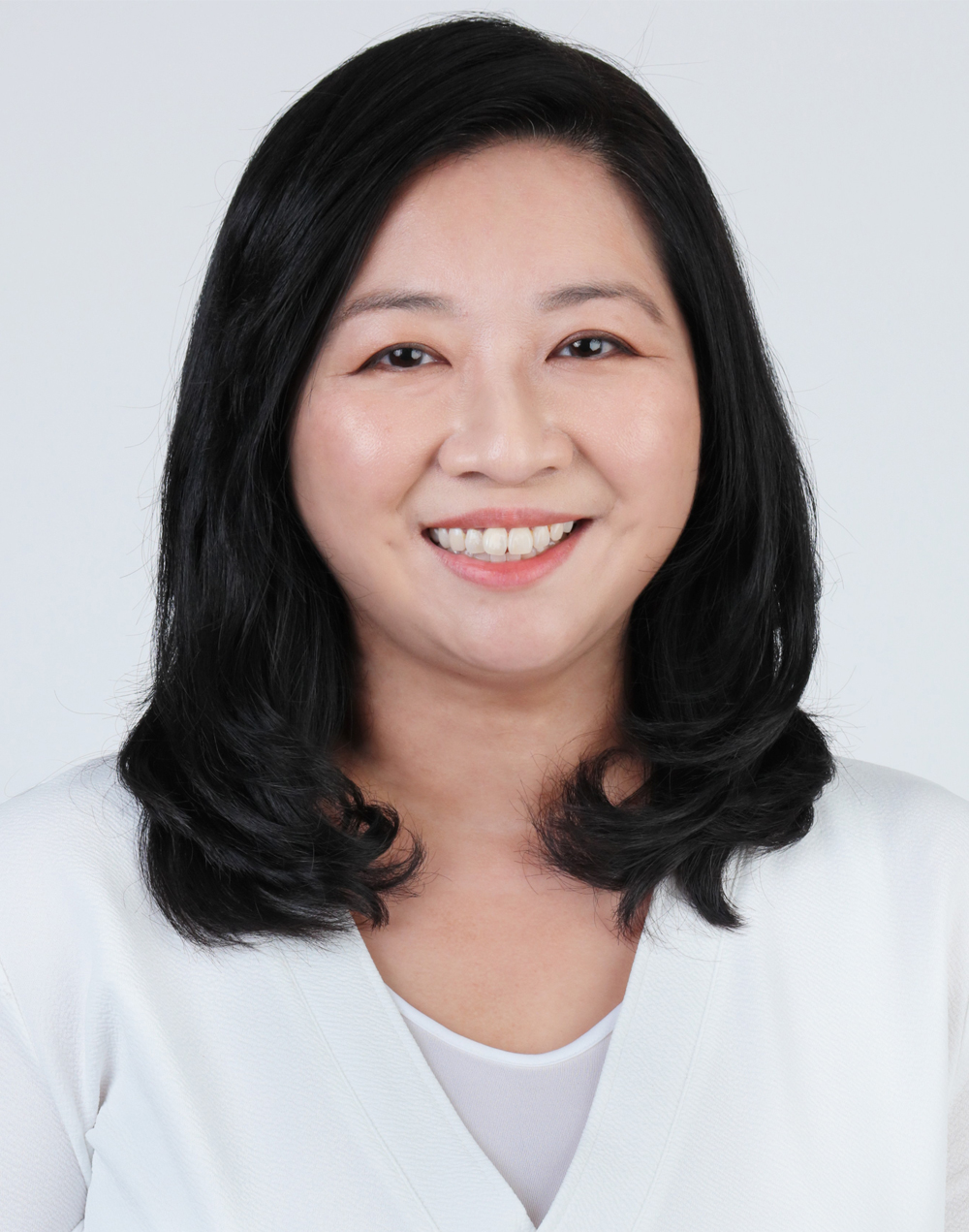
- Official portrait, 2021

Member of the Singapore Parliament for Punggol GRC
- Incumbent
- Assumed office 3 May 2025
- Preceded by: Constituency established
- Majority: 11,956 (10.34%)

Member of the Singapore Parliament for Pasir Ris–Punggol GRC
- In office 10 July 2020 – 15 April 2025
- Preceded by: PAP held
- Succeeded by: Constituency abolished
- Majority: 44,466 (28.30%)

Personal details
- Born: 14 July 1976 (age 50) Singapore
- Party: People's Action Party
- Education: National University of Singapore (BSS)

Yeo Wan Ling (Note: Chinese: 杨涴淩; pinyin: Yáng Wǎnlíng) (born 14 July 1976) is a Singaporean politician. A member of the governing People's Action Party (PAP), she has been the Member of Parliament (MP) representing the Punggol Shore division of Pasir Ris–Punggol Group Representation Constituency from 2020 to 2025 and Punggol Group Representation Constituency since 2025.

== Education ==
Yeo studied at Raffles Girls' Secondary School and Raffles Junior College, and graduated with a Bachelor of Social Sciences in sociology and political science from the National University of Singapore.

== Career ==
Yeo is currently the Assistant Secretary-General of National Trades Union Congress, overseeing NTUC's small and medium-sized enterprise unit, as well as its Women and Family Unit. Prior to joining NTUC, she was the founder and chief executive officer of social enterprise Caregiver Asia; which aggregates freelance caregivers and care services for deployment into homes, healthcare institutes and welfare organisations. Before that, Yeo worked at the Economic Development Board as part of the global operations team.

Yeo, as Assistant Secretary-General of the NTUC, is often called a labour MP by the Singapore media. In October 2024, ChannelNewsAsia noted that none of the labour MPs filed any questions or spoke during the parliamentary debate concerning the controversial deal to sell a controlling 51% stake in NTUC Enterprise subsidiary Income Insurance to Allianz. Yeo is part of the Government Parliamentary Committee under Manpower where she serves as chairman since 2025. Yeo has served as the Vice-Chairman of the Punggol Town Council since 2025.

== Notes ==
Parliament of Singapore
| Preceded by Zainal bin Sapari; Teo Chee Hean; Teo Ser Luck; Sun Xueling; Janil Puthucheary | Member of Parliament for Pasir Ris–Punggol GRC; 2020–2025; Served alongside: Sharael Taha, Desmond Tan, Teo Chee Hean, Janil Puthucheary | Constituency abolished |
| New constituency | Member of Parliament for Punggol GRC; 2025–present Served alongside: Janil Puthucheary, Gan Kim Yong, Sun Xueling | Incumbent |
