= Punggol West Single Member Constituency =

Former electoral division in Singapore

Punggol West
- Former Single Member constituency for the Parliament of Singapore
- Region: North-East Region, Singapore
- Electorate: 26,732 (2025)

Former constituency
- Created: 2020; 6 years ago
- Abolished: 2025; 1 year ago
- Seats: 1
- Member: Constituency abolished
- Town Council: Pasir Ris–Punggol
- Created from: Pasir Ris–Punggol GRC
- Replaced by: Punggol GRC

The Punggol West Single Member Constituency was a Single Member Constituency (SMC) located in the north-eastern area of Singapore. At abolition, it was managed by Pasir Ris–Punggol Town Council.

== History ==
Leading up to the 2020 general election, Punggol West SMC was carved out of Pasir Ris–Punggol Group Representation Constituency (GRC). It had previously been a division in said GRC. At said election, Tan Chen Chen from the Workers' Party (WP) contested the SMC against Sun Xueling, the former Member of Parliament (MP) for the GRC division. Sun won with around 61% of the vote.

For the 2025 general election, the SMC was absorbed into Punggol GRC after one term as its own constituency.

== Members of Parliament ==
Year	Member	Party
Formation
2020	Sun Xueling	PAP
Constituency abolished (2025)

== Electoral results ==
Note: The Elections Department does not include rejected votes when calculating the vote shares of candidates. Hence, all candidates' vote shares will total to 100% at any given election (may not appear so in multi-way contests due to rounding).

=== Elections in 2020s ===
General Election 2020
Party	Candidate	Votes	%
PAP	Sun Xueling	15,655	60.98
WP	Tan Chen Chen	10,017	39.02
Majority		5,638	21.96
Total valid votes		25,672	99.16
Rejected ballots		217	0.84
Turnout		25,889	97.37
Registered electors		26,587	
PAP win (new seat)			
