= Punggol Group Representation Constituency =

Electoral division in Singapore

Punggol
- Group representation constituency for the Parliament of Singapore
- Region: North-East Region, Singapore
- Electorate: 123,820

Current constituency
- Created: 11 March 2025; 20 months ago
- Seats: 4
- Party: People’s Action Party
- Members: Gan Kim Yong; Janil Puthucheary; Sun Xueling; Yeo Wan Ling
- Town Council: Punggol
- Created from: Pasir Ris–Punggol GRC (Punggol); Punggol West SMC

The Punggol Group Representation Constituency (Note: Malay: Kawasan Undi Perwakilan Berkumpulan Punggol; Chinese: 榜鹅集选区; Tamil: பொங்கோல் குழுத்தொகுதி) is a four-member group representation constituency (GRC) in the north-east of Singapore. It has four divisions: Punggol Coast, Punggol North, Punggol Shore, and Punggol West, managed by Punggol Town Council. The current Members of Parliament (MPs) for the constituency are Deputy Prime Minister and Minister for Trade and Industry Gan Kim Yong, Janil Puthucheary, Sun Xueling and Yeo Wan Ling from the governing People's Action Party (PAP).

== History ==
Prior to the 2025 general election, Punggol GRC was formed by merging the entirety of Punggol West Single Member Constituency (SMC) with the Punggol Coast and Punggol Shore divisions of the defunct Pasir Ris–Punggol GRC. This was ostensibly done due to population growth in Punggol, as well as a need to better reflect the geographical location of the town.

On Nomination Day, Gan Kim Yong, the incumbent deputy prime minister and previous anchor minister (Note: A full Cabinet minister leading the PAP team in a GRC.) for Chua Chu Kang GRC, where he had been expected to stay, was deployed to Punggol GRC to lead the PAP team in a move announced at the last minute against a "strong" challenge from lawyer Harpreet Singh Nehal and his team representing the Workers' Party (WP). The PAP won 55.17% of the vote.

After the result for Punggol GRC was announced, the Singaporean mainstream media attributed the defeat of one of the WP's perceivedly strongest slates in the general election to Gan's position and perceived importance as deputy prime minister, as well as a sense of geopolitical uncertainty. Before the election, political analysts had predicted that Punggol GRC would be vulnerable for the PAP to a repeat WP victory, analogous to that of the then-new Sengkang GRC in the 2020 general election.

== Constituency profile ==
Punggol GRC includes key transport infrastructure such as the Punggol and Punggol Coast MRT stations, along with the entire Punggol LRT line, which together serve the town's residential and commercial areas. The constituency is home to the campus of the Singapore Institute of Technology (SIT), a major tertiary institution. Other notable landmarks within the GRC include Coney Island, a designated nature reserve, as well as Waterway Point shopping centre, Marina Country Club and the integrated community hub One Punggol, which also houses the Punggol Library. The Punggol Regional Sports Centre and new residential developments such as Northshore, which have been constructed as part of the town's expansion since the late 2010s and early 2020s, are also in the GRC.

The GRC has a relatively high proportion of young voters, with over half of its more than 120,000 voters estimated to be aged between 21 and 45 as of the 2025 general election.

== Members of Parliament ==
Divisions or wards of Punggol GRC as of the 2025 general election:
1 Punggol Coast
2 Punggol North
3 Punggol Shore
4 Punggol West

Year	Division	Members of Parliament	Party
Formation
2025	Punggol Coast; Punggol North; Punggol Shore; Punggol West	Janil Puthucheary; Gan Kim Yong; Yeo Wan Ling; Sun Xueling	PAP

== Electoral results ==
Note: The Elections Department does not include rejected votes when calculating the vote shares of candidates. Hence, all candidates' vote shares will total to 100% at any given election (may not appear so in multi-way contests due to rounding).

=== Elections in 2020s ===
General Election 2025
Party	Candidate	Votes	%
PAP	Gan Kim Yong Janil Puthucheary Sun Xueling Yeo Wan Ling	63,745	55.17
WP	Alexis Dang Harpreet Singh Nehal Jackson Au Siti Alia Mattar	51,789	44.83
Majority		11,956	10.34
Total valid votes		115,534	99.29
Rejected ballots		823	0.71
Turnout		116,357	93.97
Registered electors		123,820	
PAP win (new seat)			
