= Harpreet Singh Nehal =

Singaporean lawyer

Harpreet Singh
- ਹਰਪ੍ਰੀਤ ਸਿੰਘ
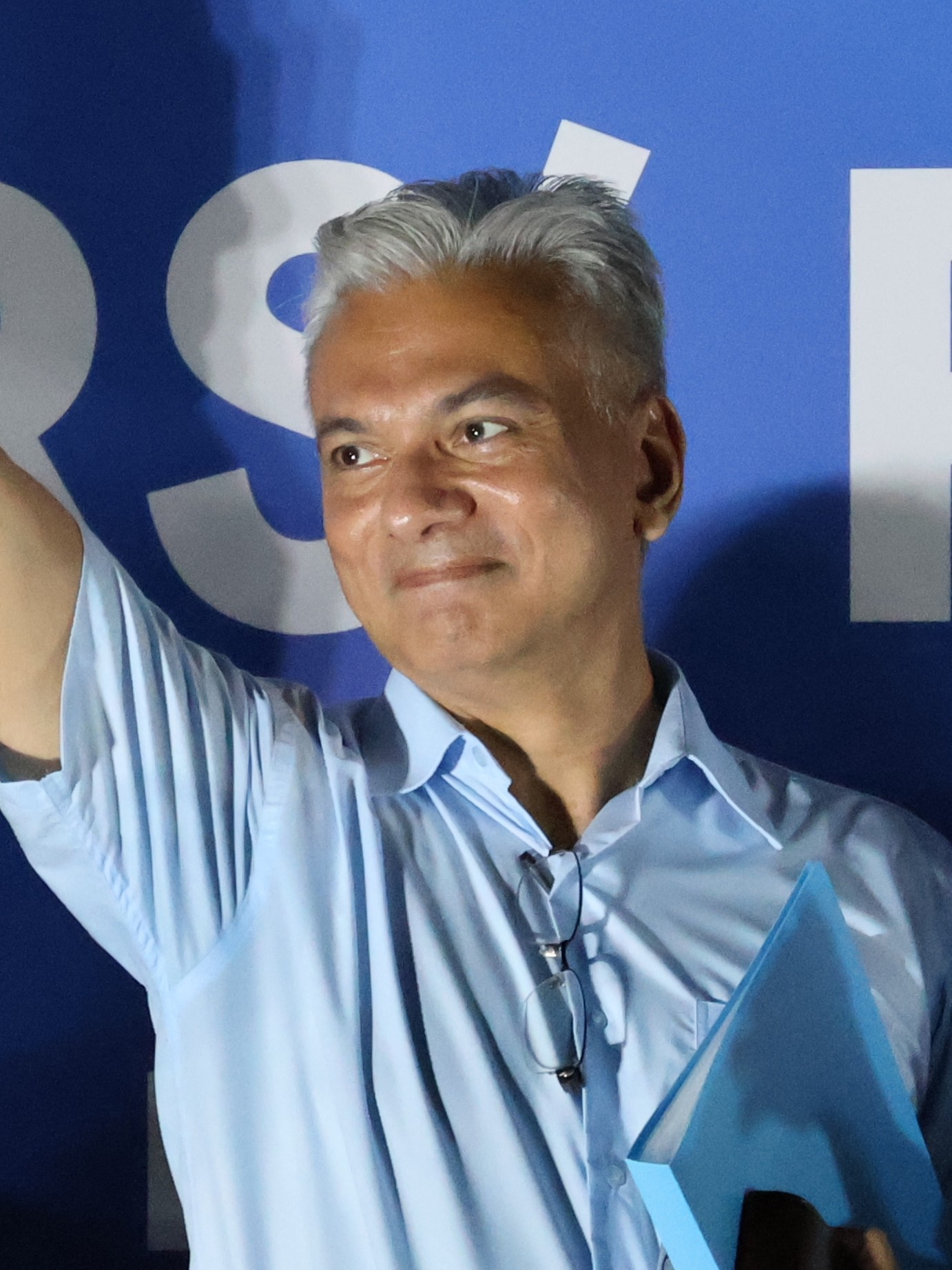
- Singh in 2025

Personal details
- Born: Harpreet Singh Nehal; 4 February 1966 (age 60) Singapore
- Party: Workers' Party (2023–present)
- Children: 4
- Education: Hwa Chong Junior College
- Alma mater: National University of Singapore (LLB); Harvard University (LLM)
- Occupation: lawyer, politician

Harpreet Singh Nehal (Note: Punjabi: ਹਰਪ੍ਰੀਤ ਸਿੰਘ ਨਿਹਾਲ, romanized: Harprīt Siṅgh Nihāl) SC (born 4 February 1966) is a Singaporean lawyer and politician who is a co-managing partner of Audent Chambers LLC. His main areas of practice involve international arbitration and commercial litigation in various industries such as banking and finance, oil and gas, company law, as well as equity and trusts. Singh left Cavenagh Law LLP and Clifford Chance in 2019 to set up his own disputes practice, Audent Chambers LLC, together with a colleague, Jordan Tan.

Singh joined politics in 2021, becoming an official member of the Workers' Party (WP) in 2023. He contested in the new Punggol Group Representation Constituency (GRC) under the party's banner for the 2025 Singaporean general election and lost to the governing People's Action Party (PAP).

== Early life and education ==
Singh was born in 1966 in a Teochew kampong in Upper Serangoon in the north-east of Singapore. He comes from a Punjabi Sikh family. He attended Parry Avenue Boys' School, St. Andrew's Secondary School, and Hwa Chong Junior College.

Singh graduated from the National University of Singapore with a Bachelor of Laws (Honours) in 1991, and from Harvard Law School with a Master of Laws in 1993.

== Legal career ==
Singh was admitted as an advocate and solicitor in Singapore on 20 May 1992. He initially served as a Justice's Law Clerk before joining Drew & Napier LLC. He was an equity partner in 2012 when he left to join WongPartnership LLP's Litigation and Dispute Resolution Group.

Later that year, he left to join the formal law alliance between Cavenagh Law LLP and Clifford Chance Pte Ltd as a founding partner.

In December 2018, he stepped down as managing partner of Cavenagh Law. He retired from the partnership of Clifford Chance in June 2019, and in July that year, he co-founded Audent Chambers LLC with Jordan Tan. The chambers focuses on arbitration and civil and commercial litigation. It conducts advocacy only and receives instructions from solicitor firms.

Singh was appointed as a Senior Counsel in 2007. He was ranked in Band 1 by Chambers and Partners for Dispute Resolution (Litigation) in their Asia-Pacific Guide 2024.

=== Notable cases ===
Singh has acted as advocate in various notable Singapore cases, including the following:

- Public Prosecutor v Norzian bin Bintat [1995] SGHC 207, which was a landmark constitutional law case in which Yong Pung How CJ asserted the independence of judicial power and held that the Public Prosecutor did not have a veto over the Court's decision to discharge or acquit an accused person.
- Tan Seng Kee v Attorney-General [2022] SGCA 16 in which the Court of Appeal held that Section 377A of the Penal Code was unenforceable in its entirety in light of a political compromise struck by the Singapore Government in 2007 and Attorney-General Lucien Wong's representations in 2018 that the Public Prosecutor would not prosecute sexual acts between two consenting adult men in private.

== Other appointments ==
From 2019 to 2023, Singh was appointed by the Monetary Authority of Singapore (MAS) to the Appeal Advisory Panels under the Business Trusts Act, Financial Advisers Act, Insurance Act, Securities and Futures Act and Trust Companies Act. He served as a reviewer in the investigation of an international bank in relation to a corruption scandal. He also sits on the Disciplinary and Appeals Committees for the SGX.

== Political career ==
Singh started volunteering with Workers' Party (WP) in 2021 and became a member in 2023. In November 2023, it was reported that Harpreet had been spotted with members at walkabouts and house visits, wearing the party's light-blue t-shirt with the party logo and selling the party's newspaper alongside party members.

On 20 April 2025, Singh was announced as a Workers' Party candidate for the 2025 Singaporean general election. Prior to nomination day, Singh was seen walking on the ground within Marine Parade–Braddell Heights GRC. Eventually on Nomination Day, 23 April 2025, a WP team led by him was officially nominated to contest in Punggol GRC and proceeded to lose with 44.83% of the vote.

On 28 June 2026, Singh was included as part of the 12-member Workers' Party's Central Executive Committee.

== Charity work ==
Singh has engaged pro bono on a number of criminal cases, such as Public Prosecutor v Norzian bin Bintat [1995] SGHC 207 and Public Prosecutor v Barokah [2009] SGHC 46. He had also donated to the Saw Swee Hock School of Public Health at the National University of Singapore (NUS), for research work on the long term healthcare for an aging population.

== Personal views ==
In 2023, Singh's criticism of the Singapore authorities' decision not to prosecute senior management of Keppel Offshore & Marine in respect of bribes paid to Brazilian officials was published by the Singapore Academy of Law (SAL). His commentary was subsequently taken down by the SAL.

Singh had also commented on the leasing of government-owned bungalows on Ridout Road by Home Affairs and Law Minister K Shanmugam and Foreign Affairs Minister Vivian Balakrishnan. In his commentary, published by the online magazine, Jom, he emphasised the importance that the government's review of the leases involve full disclosure of all material facts and be conducted by respected and independent third parties so that it is perceived to be transparent and unbiased.

== Personal life ==
Singh is divorced with four adult children. He speaks Teochew due to his childhood and is learning Mandarin.
