= Waterway Point =

Coordinates: 1°24′24″N 103°54′7″E

Waterway Point
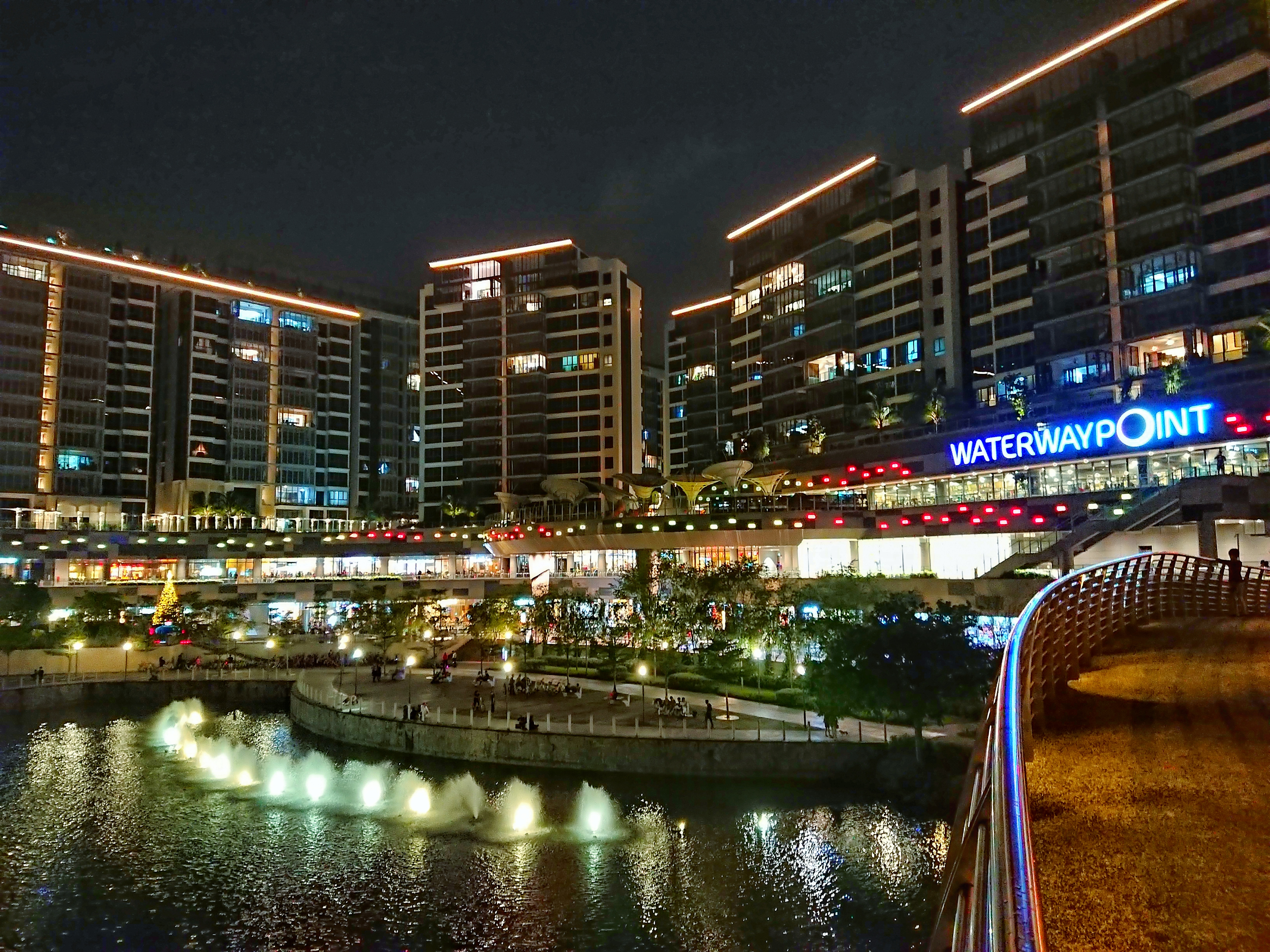
- Waterway Point in 2018.
- Location: Punggol, Singapore
- Address: 83 Punggol Central, Singapore 828761
- Opened: 18 January 2016; 10 years ago (Soft opening); 19 April 2016; 10 years ago (Official opening)
- Developer: Frasers Property; Far East Organization; Sekisui House
- Manager: Frasers Centrepoint Malls
- Owner: Frasers Centrepoint Malls
- Num. of stores: 203
- Num. of anchor tenants: 8 Fairprice Finest; Shaw Theatres; Don Don Donki; Cookhouse by Koufu; Best Denki; Timezone; Uniqlo; Toys R Us
- Floor area: 370,824 square feet (34,450.7 m^{2})
- Floors: 4
- Parking: Yes (620 lots)
- Public transit: NE17 PTC CP4 Punggol; Punggol
- Website: Waterway Point

Waterway Point is a suburban shopping mall located in the town centre of Punggol New Town, Singapore, next to Punggol MRT/LRT station. The mall was built as part of Punggol's first integrated waterfront residential and retail development, Watertown. It is the first mall in Singapore to be integrated with a town square and a visitors’ centre which provides an avenue for residents and the public to learn more about the heritage of Punggol through exhibitions and civic and community events. The mall had a soft launch on 18 January 2016, and was officially opened on 19 April that year.

== History ==
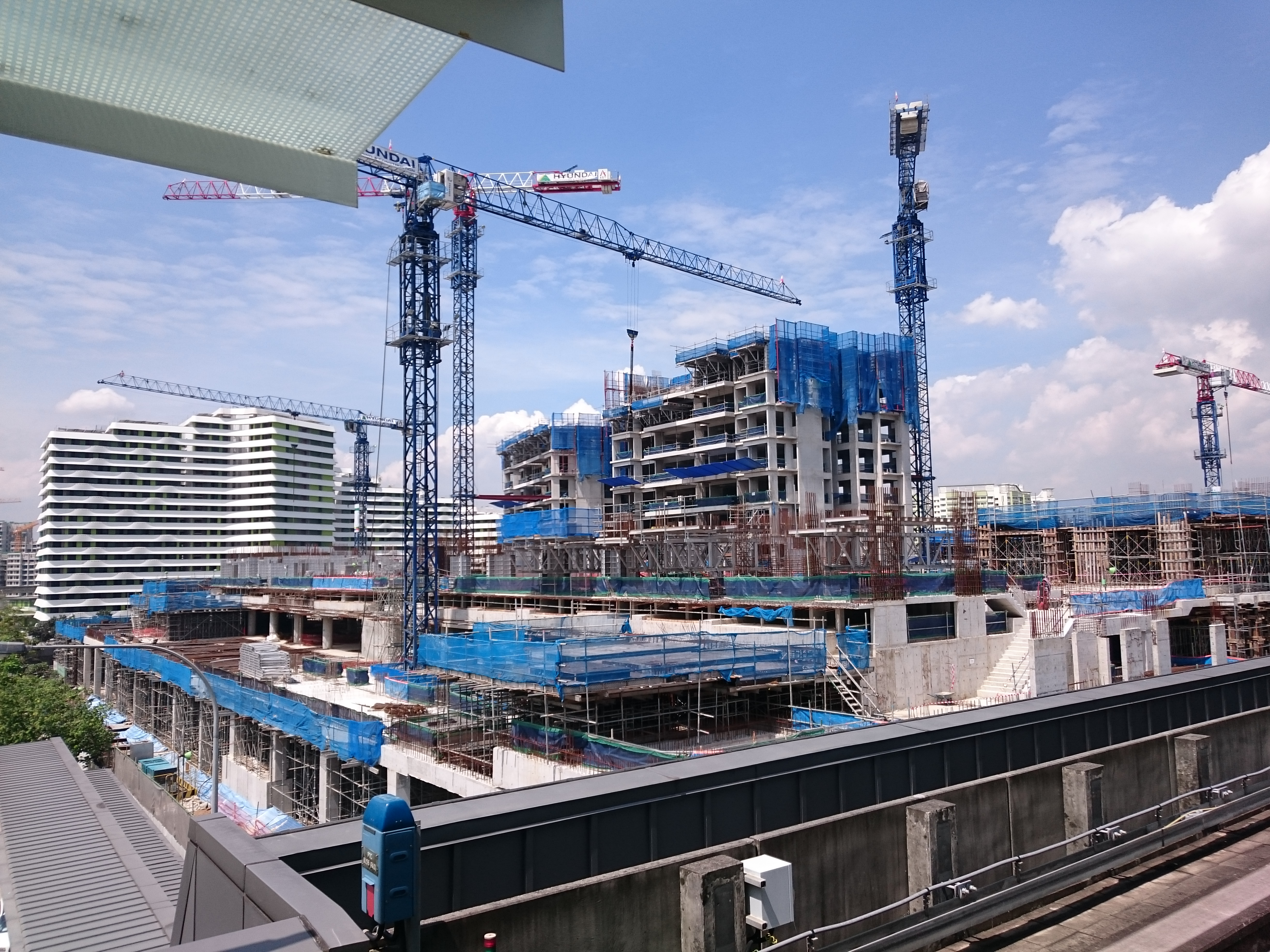
Construction of Waterway Point, in 2014.

Waterway Point was announced on 25 October 2011 by mall developer Frasers Centerpoint Limited. Built on an empty plot of land located beside the waterway and MRT station, the mall was jointly developed by Far East Organization and Sekisui House and is part of the S$1.6 billion new Watertown development. It has a total of 542,493 square feet (50,399.2 m^{2}) of gross floor area and has 370,824 square feet (34,450.7 m^{2}) of retail space spread over 4 levels inclusive of 2 basements, with a tenant mix of approximately 30% F&B, 43% retail, 15% entertainment, 12% others (education institutions, banks and clinics).

== Facilities ==
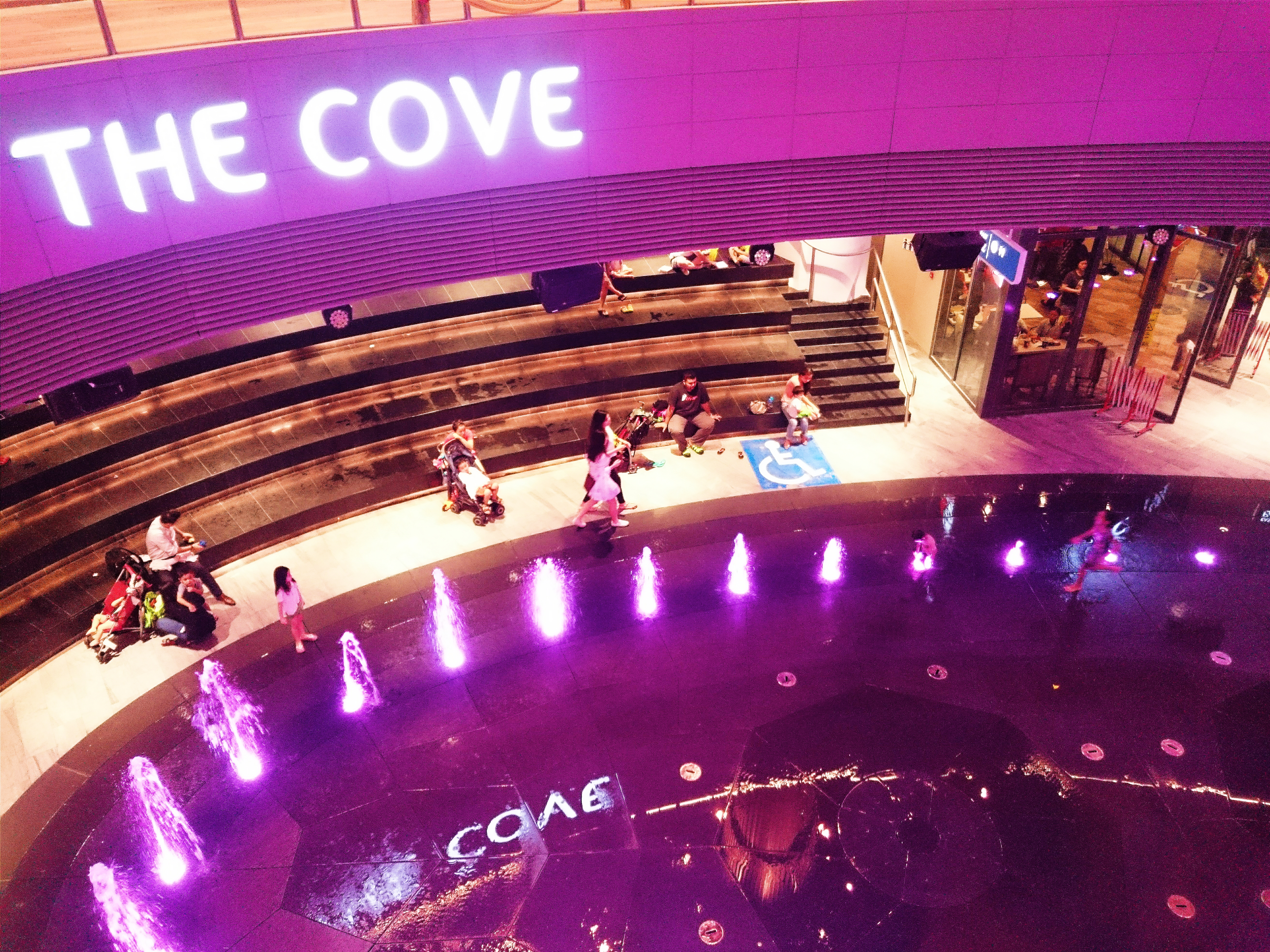
One of the themed spaces, The Cove, located within the mall.

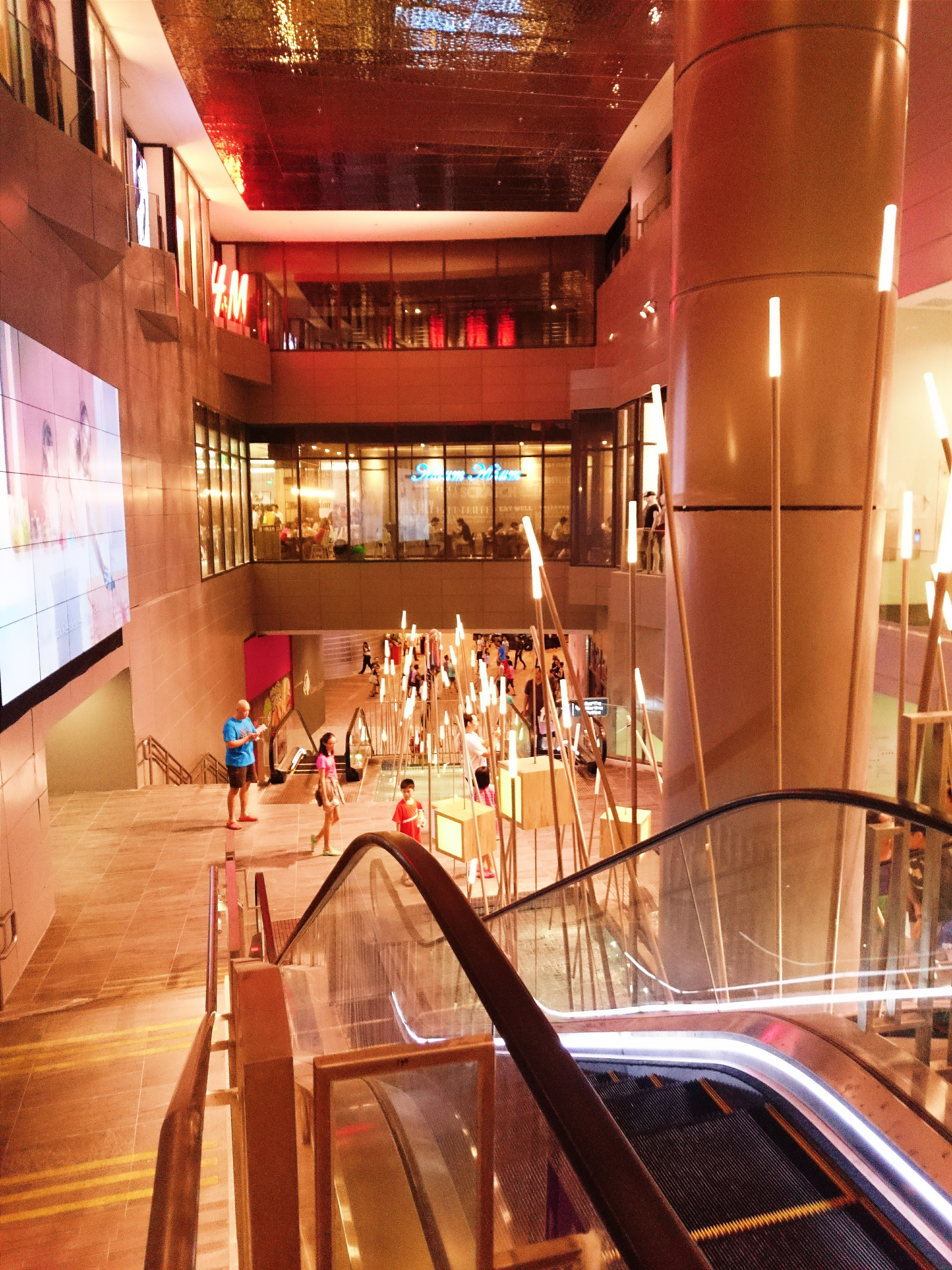
Entrance of the Boardwalk leading to the waterway.

Located beside the Punggol Waterway, Waterway Point provides various dining, fashion, entertainment and amenities for the suburban residents in the vicinity. The layout of the mall is different from many traditional mall layouts, it is separated into an East Wing and West Wing which are connected by a 24-hour walkway, The Boardwalk, linking Punggol Waterway Park with the mall and Punggol MRT/LRT Station. It also features indoor and outdoor themed spaces located throughout the mall for exhibitions, civic events and recreational activities.

The mall has various educational learning centres, bookstores and play space for children, including a dry and wet playground on the second floor. It also has a 24-hour supermarket, telecommunication shops, as well as salons and banks. It also houses the first and largest suburban basement cinema in Singapore. In 2022, the Toys R Us at Waterway Point is moved from Basement 1 to level 2 in order to make way for Don Don Donki. In 2024, the Times Bookstore was replaced by Timezone.

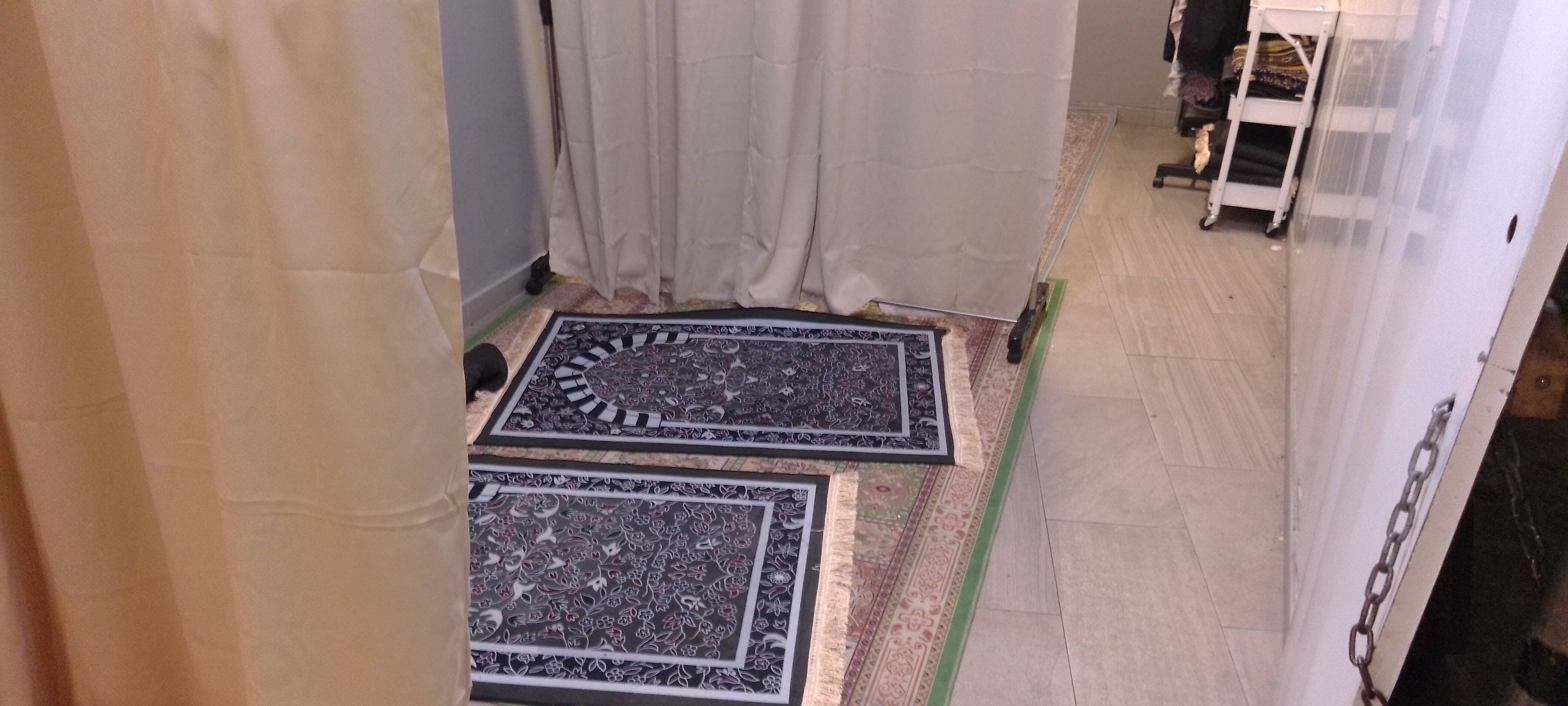
The musollah at Waterway Point has prayer mats provided.

Aside from educational and recreational facilities, there is also a small gender-segregated musalla (Muslim prayer space) in the second basement of the mall. It is furnished with prayer mats.

== Accessibility ==
Waterway Point is located beside Punggol MRT/LRT station and Punggol Temporary Bus Interchange. It serves as the main shopping mall for residents of Punggol New Town.

== Gallery ==
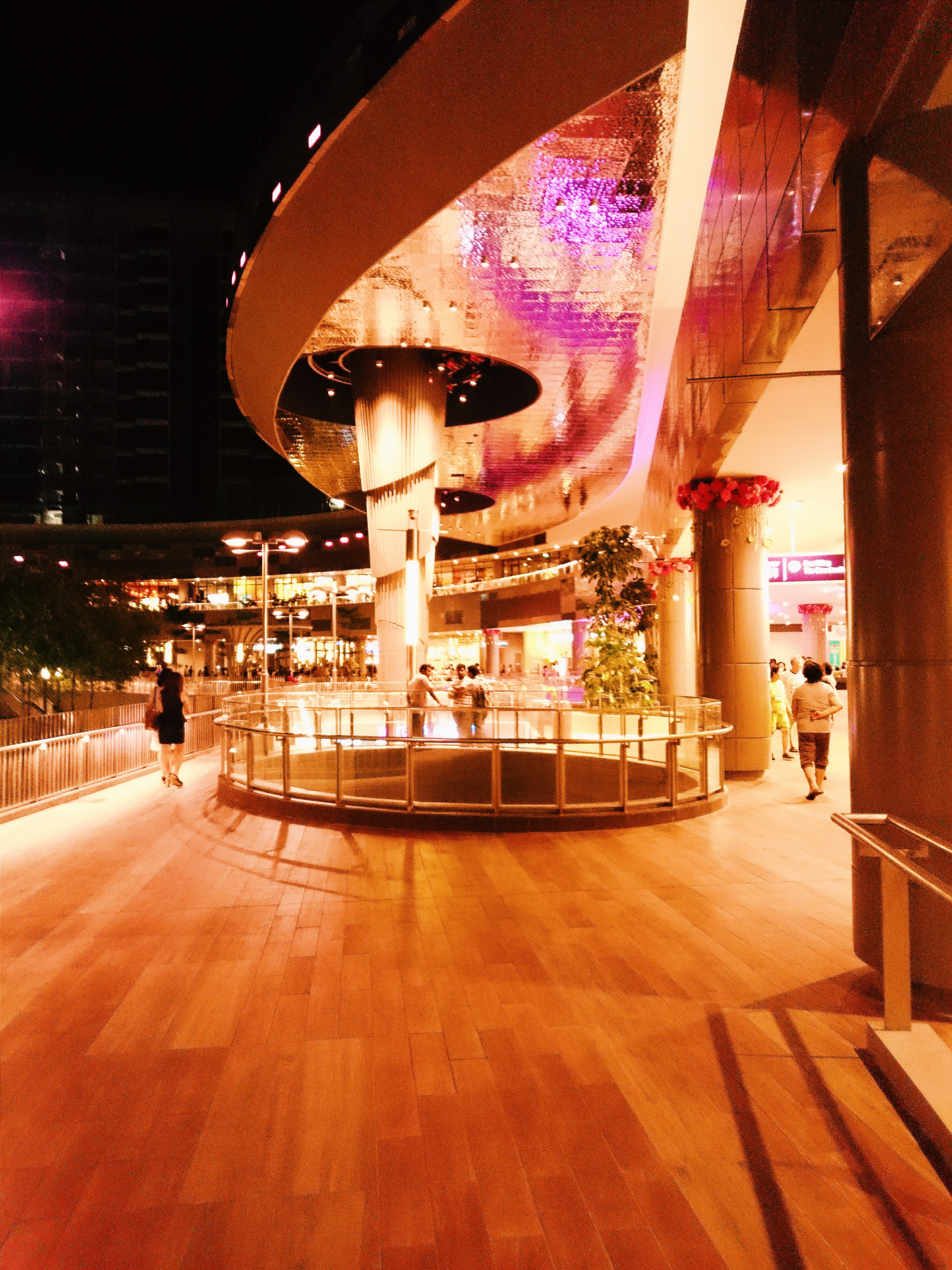
Boardwalk at Waterway Point leading to the waterway

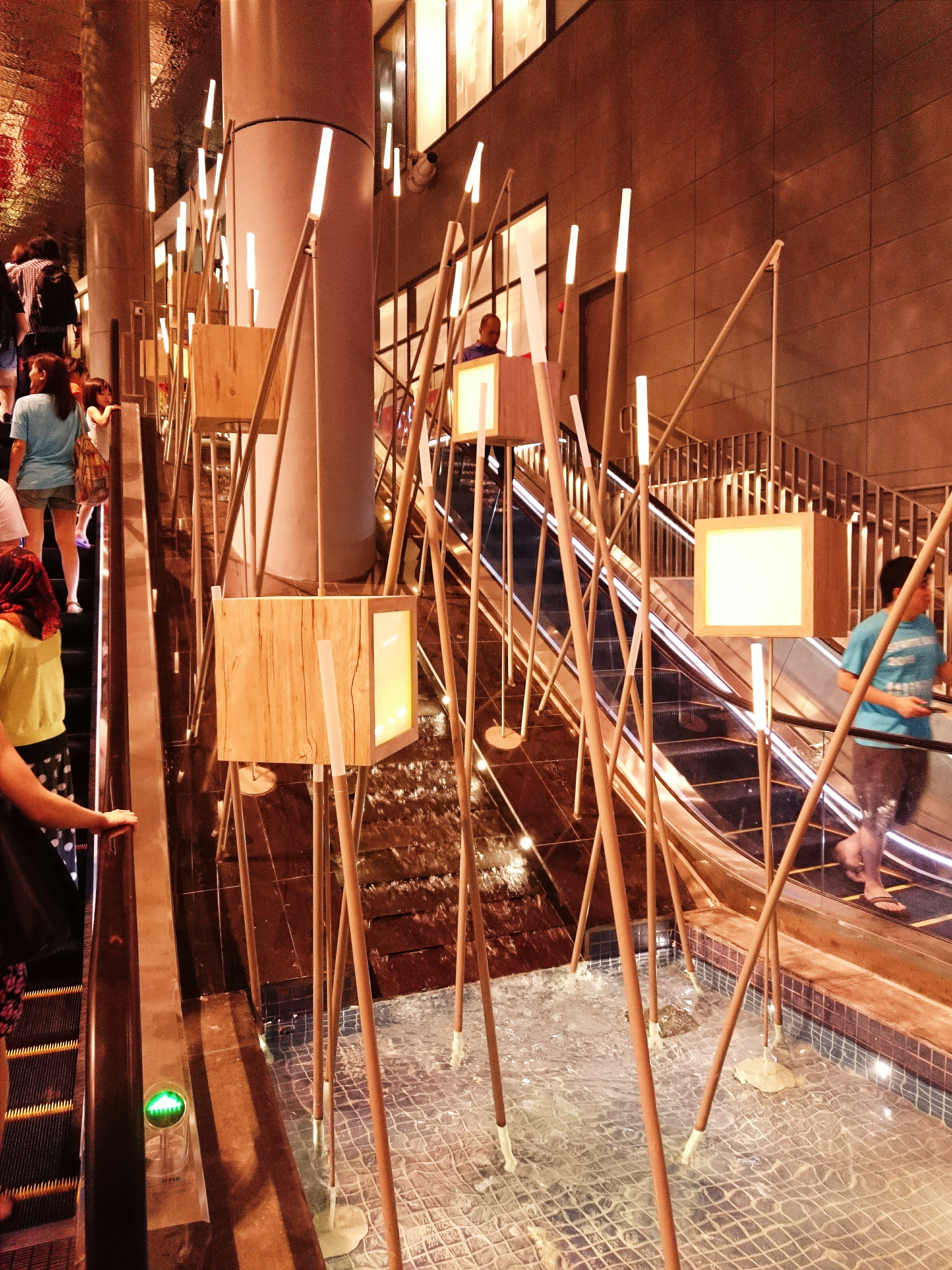
Sculptures at The Boardwalk

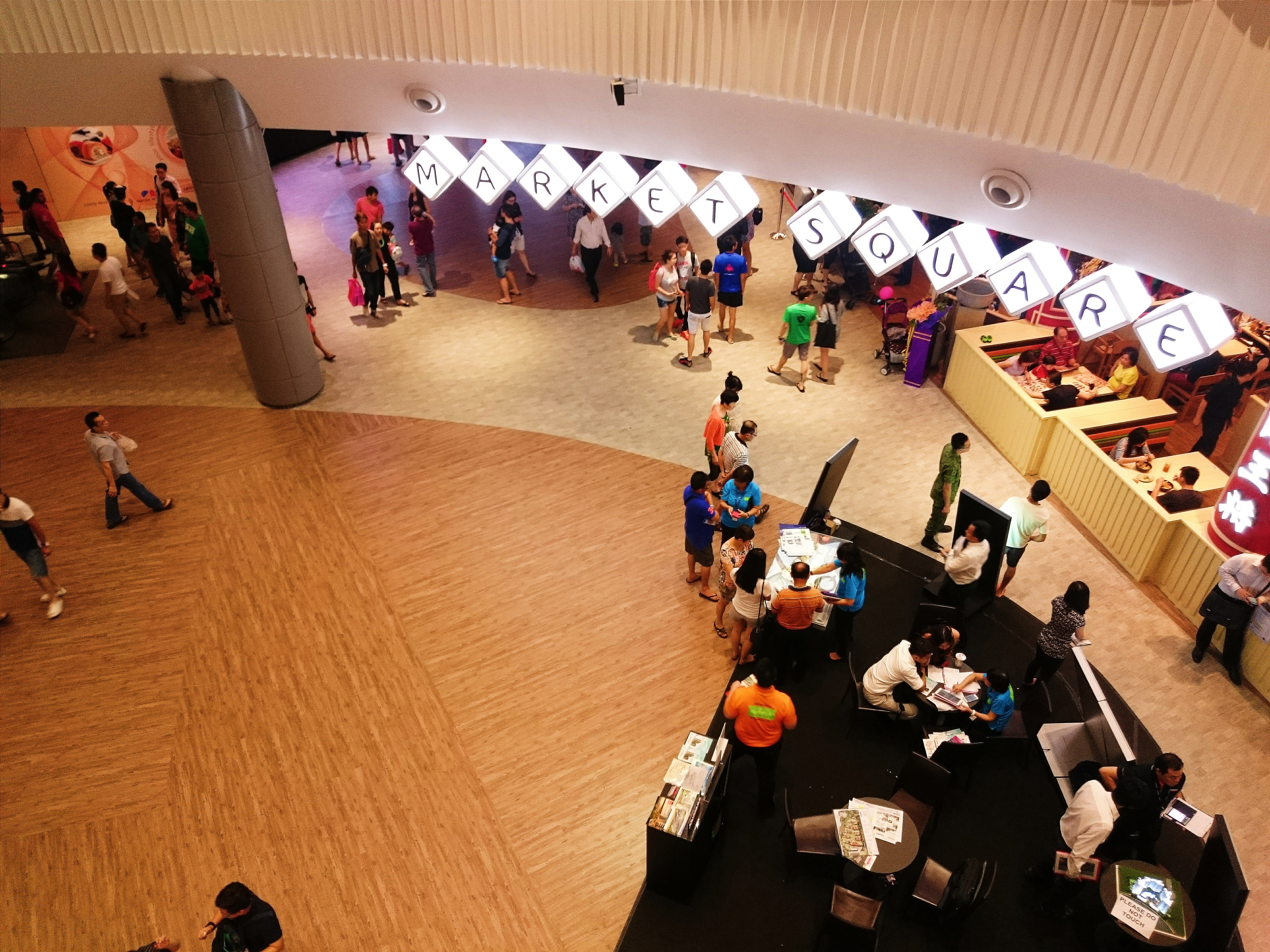
One of the themed spaces within the mall, known as Market Square.

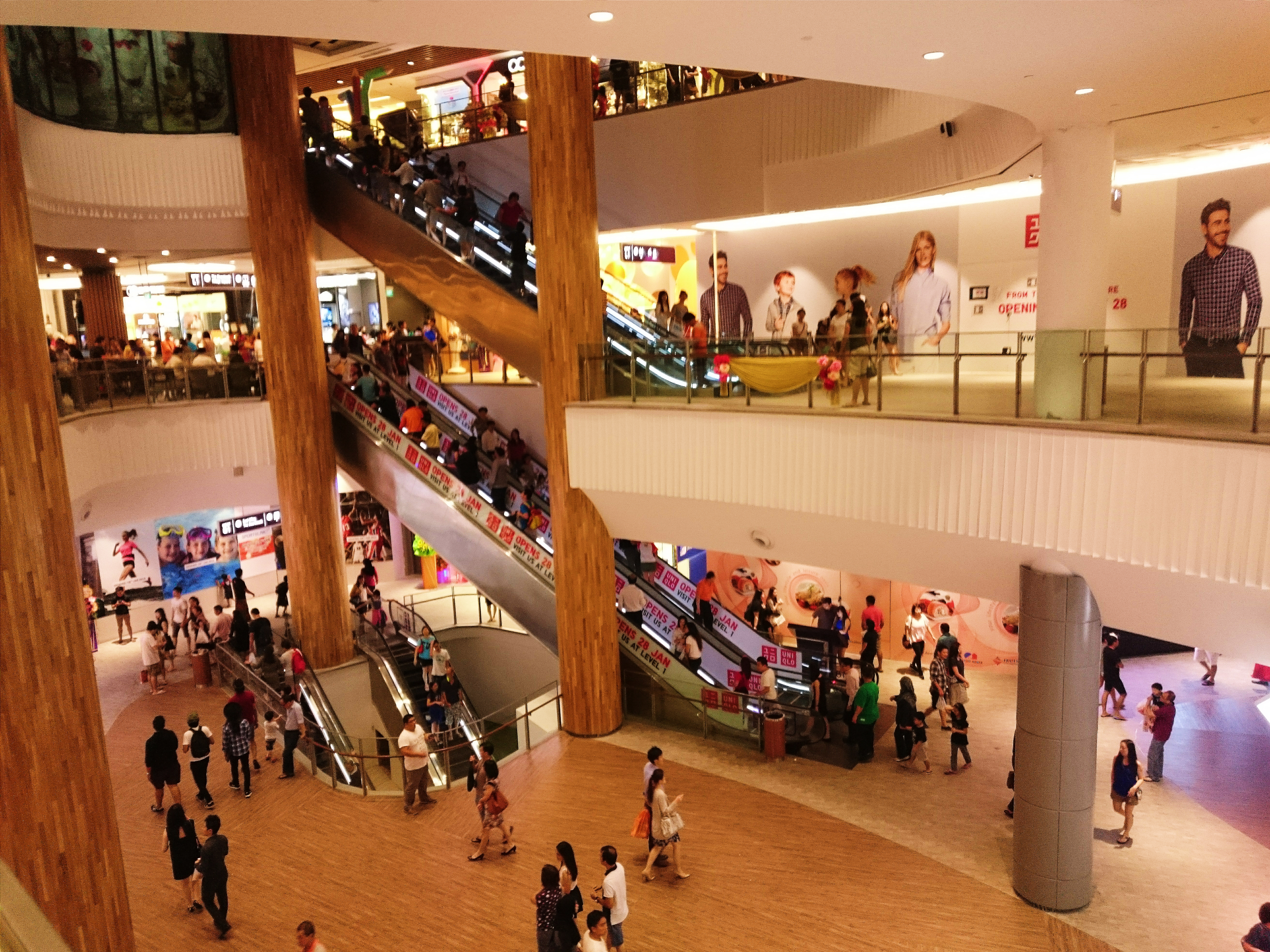
Interior of the mall

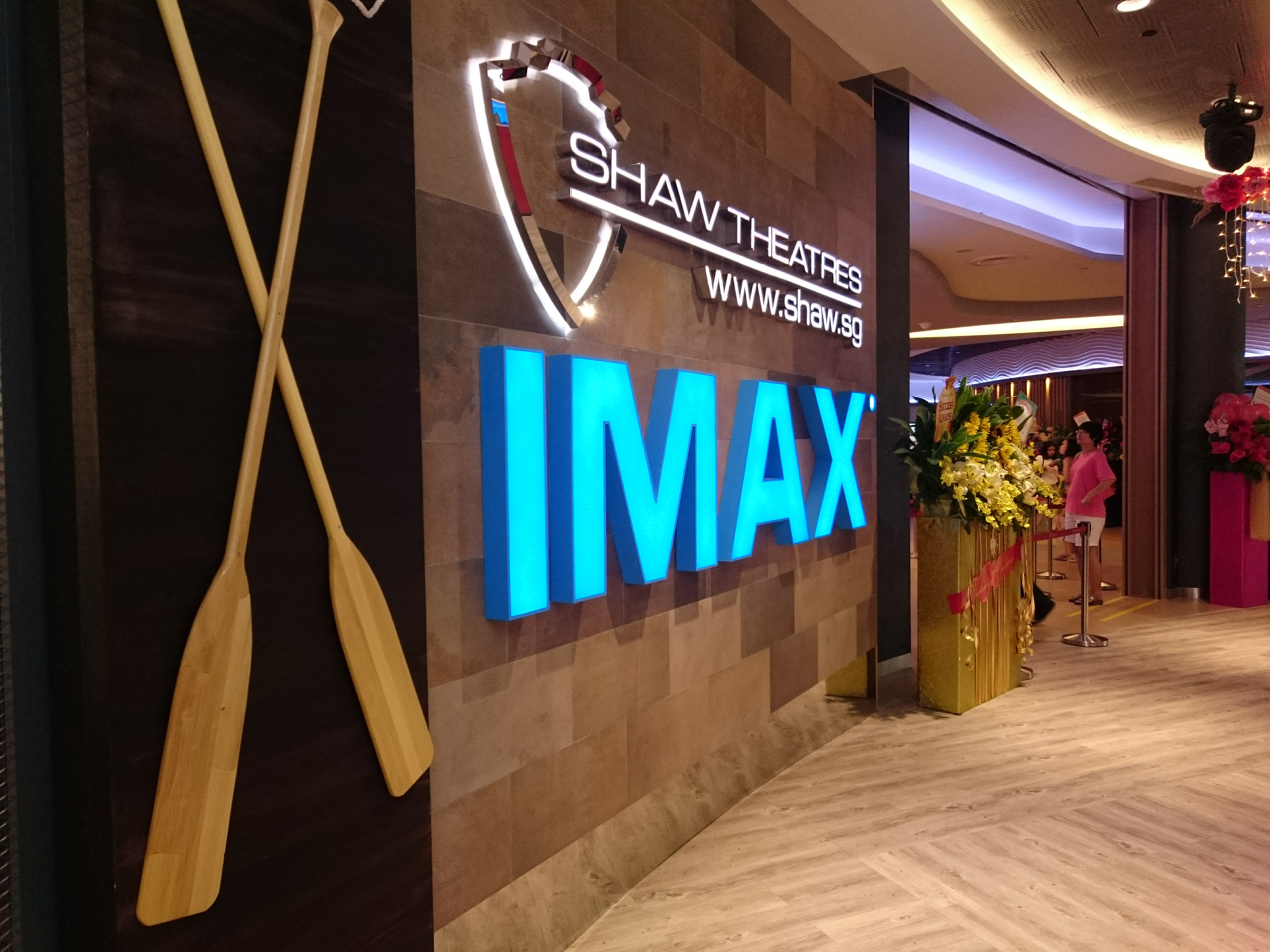
Shaw Theatres IMAX, the mall has the largest suburban cinema in Singapore

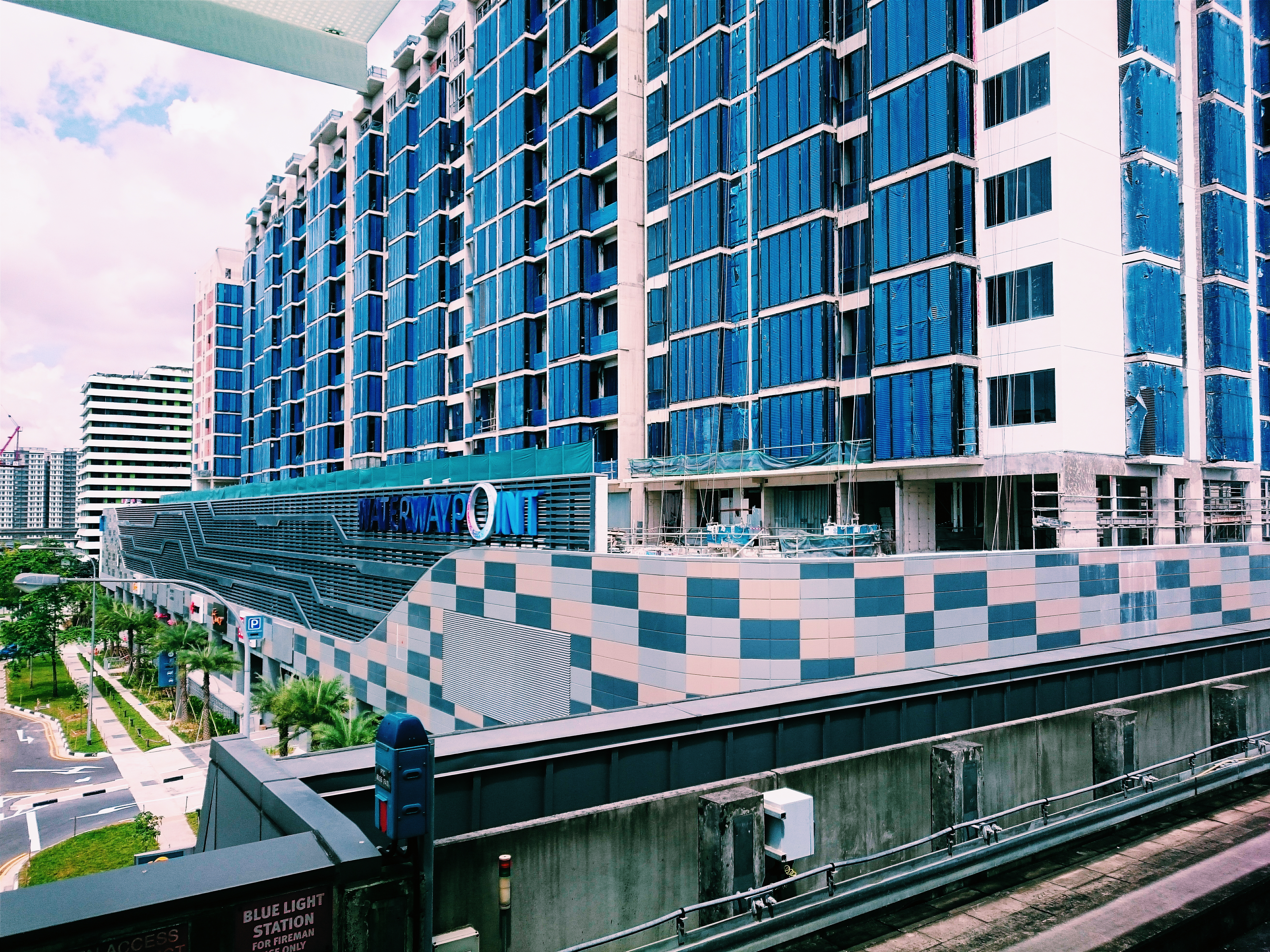
Waterway Point seen from Punggol LRT station.

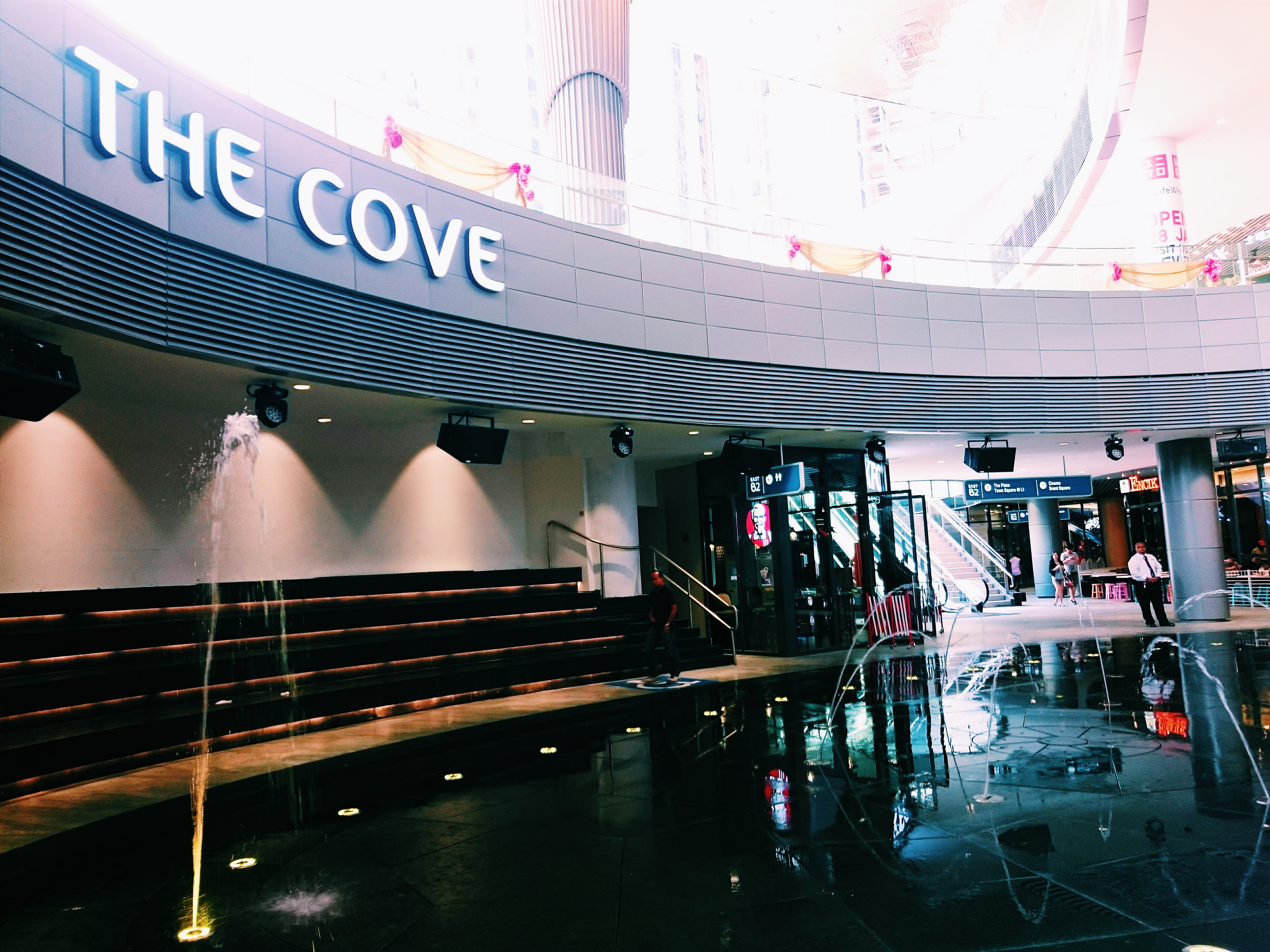
The Cove outdoor themed theatre event space.

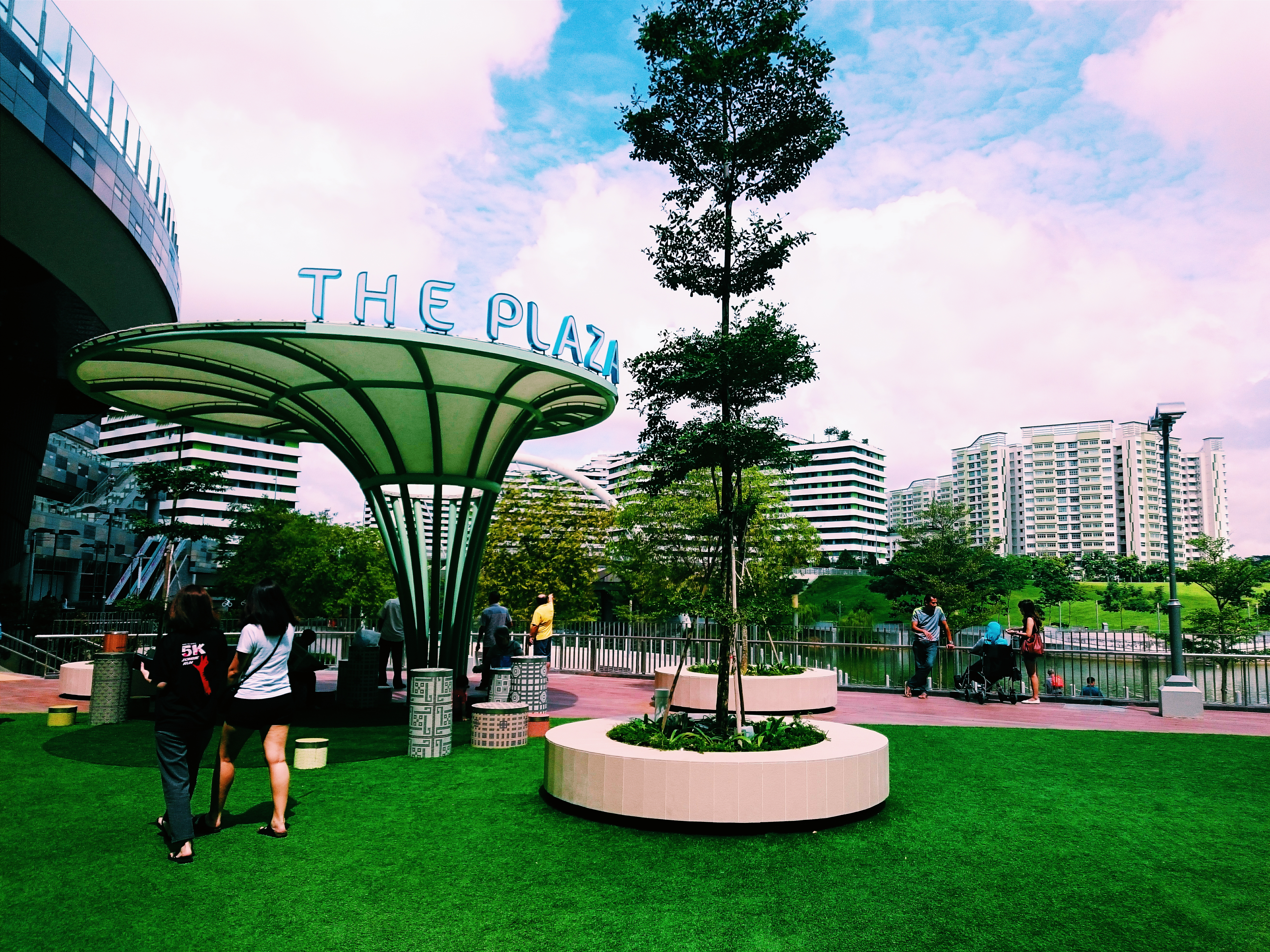
The Plaza, one of the outdoor themed spaces facing the waterway at the mall.

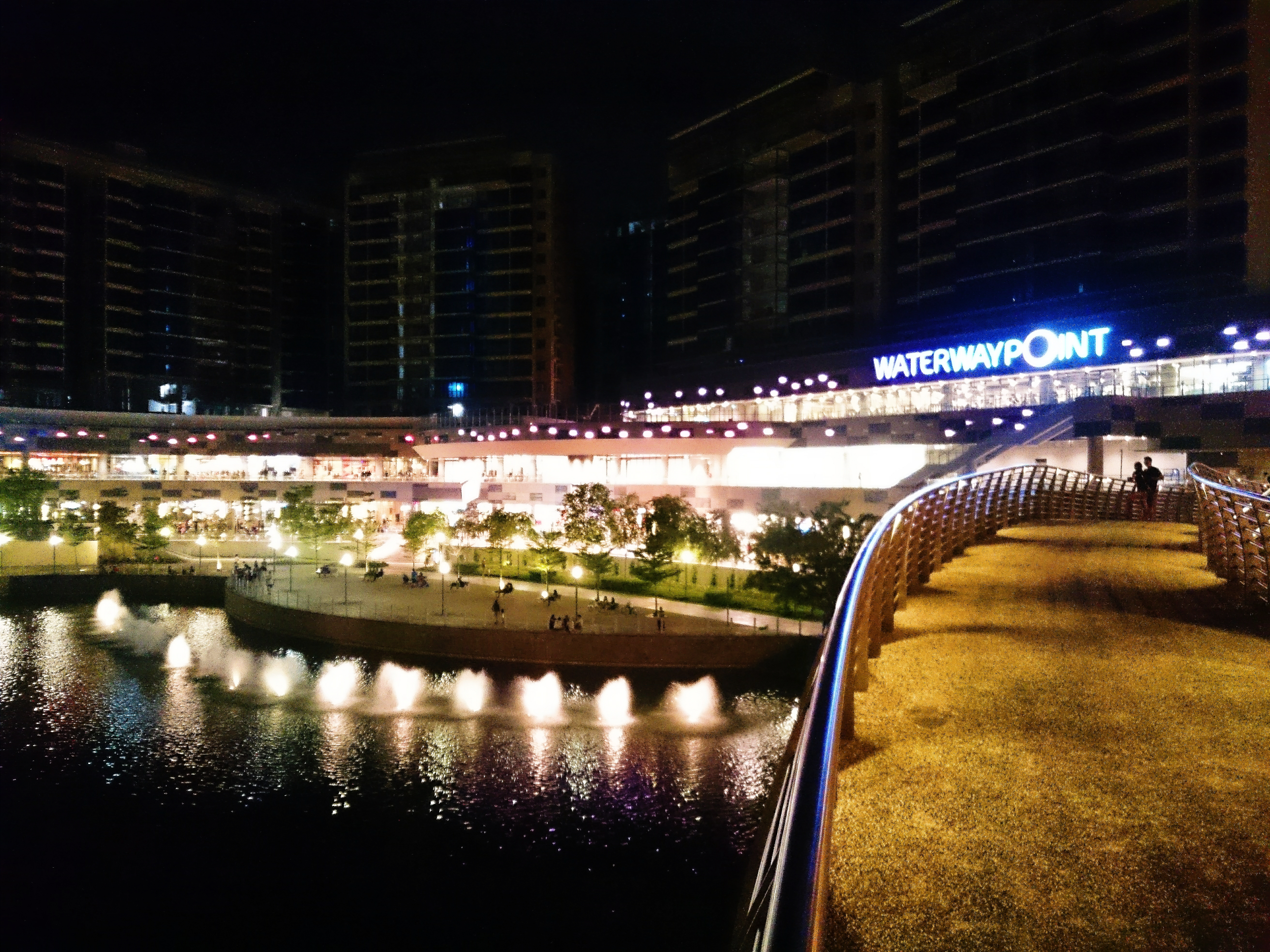
Waterway Point in 2016.

== See also ==
- Punggol Plaza
- Oasis Terraces
