= Oasis Terraces =

Building complex in Singapore

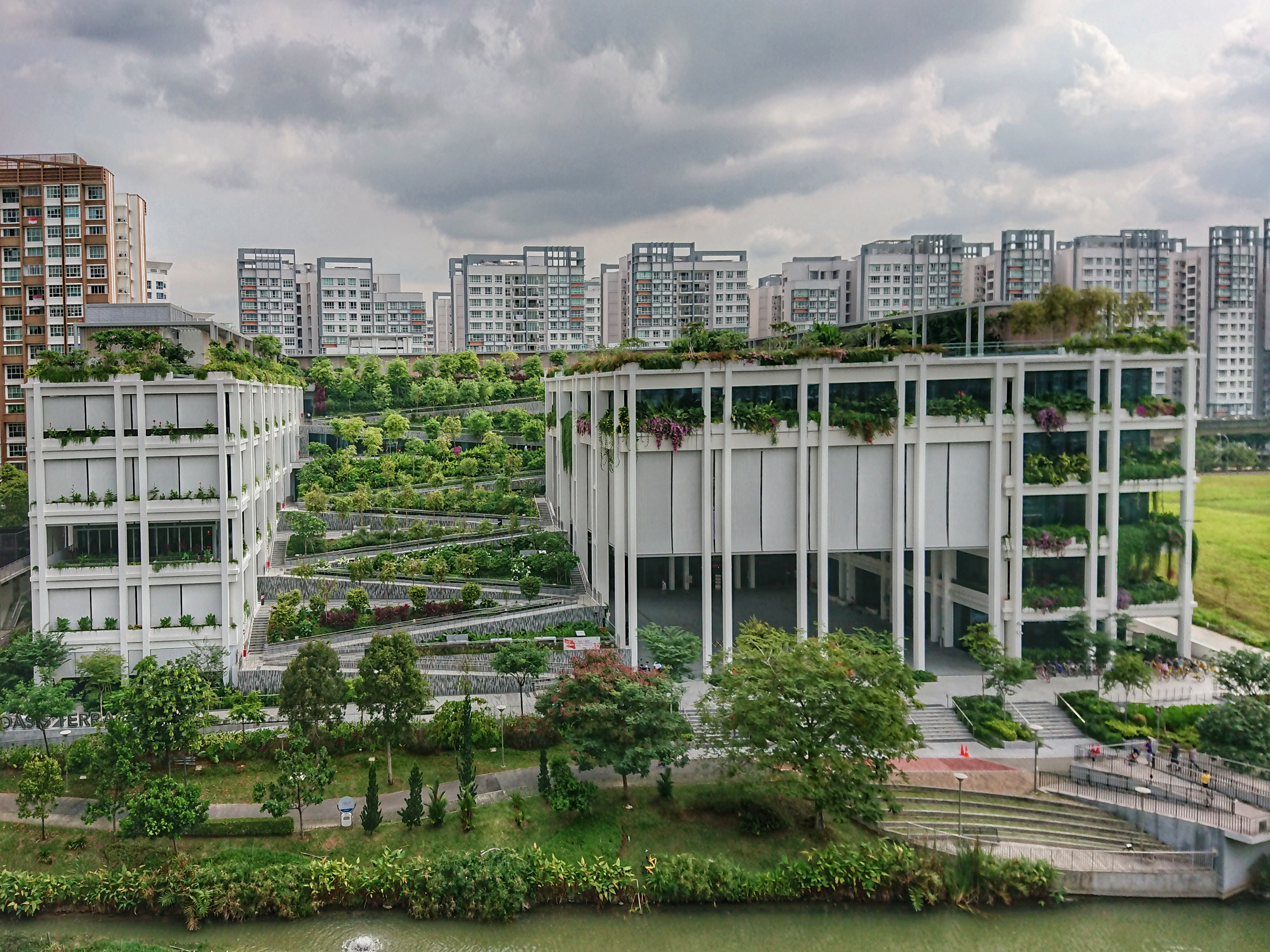
- Oasis Terraces in September 2018

General information
- Status: Completed
- Type: Mixed-use development
- Architectural style: Sustainable architecture
- Location: 681 Punggol Drive, Singapore 820681
- Coordinates: 1.402767°N 103.913175°E
- Owner: HDB

Technical details
- Floor count: 6 with 1 level basement
- Grounds: 27,400 square metres (295,000 sq ft)

Design and construction
- Architects: Serie Architects (ADC) and Multiply Architects LLP
- Developer: HDB
- Main contractor: China Construction (South Pacific) Development
Punggol Polyclinic
- SingHealth
Organisation
- Type: Polyclinic
History
- Founded: 24 November 2017; 8 years ago
Links
- Website: www.singhealth.com.sg/Pages/home.aspx
Retail
- Opened: 15 June 2018; 8 years ago
- Num. of anchor tenants: 2
- Floor area: 4

Oasis Terraces is an integrated development located in Punggol, Singapore, next to Oasis LRT station. Developed by the Housing and Development Board (HDB), the development was built as part of a new generation of neighbourhood centres, housing the Punggol Polyclinic, a retail component with restaurants and shops, a community plaza and a rooftop community garden.

== Background ==
Oasis Terraces was announced in October 2015 by the Housing and Development Board (HDB) as part of two new neighbourhood centres in Punggol that was progressively opened on 15 June 2018 and officially opened on 17 February 2019, and the other one being Northshore Plaza that progressively opened on 29 October 2021 and officially opened on 24 July 2022. Built beside the waterway, construction began on 22 August that year and was completed in June 2018. It has a total of 295,000 square feet (27,400 m^{2}) of gross floor area, with a retail area of 193,750 square feet (18,000 m^{2}) spread over 5 storeys and the polyclinic occupying 4 levels.

== Facilities ==
Located along the Punggol Waterway, the mall's facilities includes a sheltered community plaza, and a dedicated walkway through the building that connects to the Punggol Waterway. Covered walkways also connects the mall to the Oasis LRT station as well as residential blocks within the vicinity.

=== Punggol Polyclinic ===
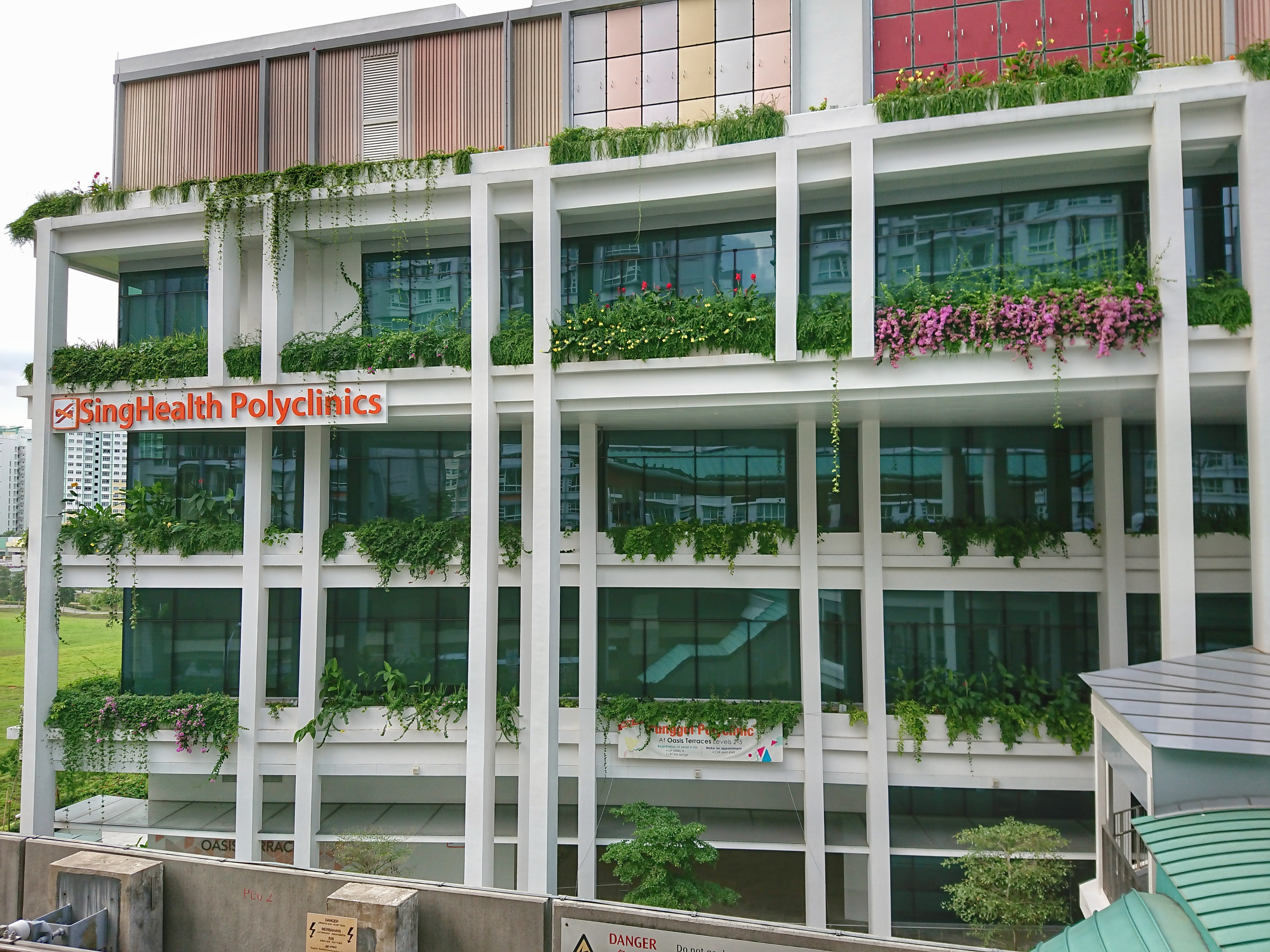
Front facade of Punggol Polyclinic at Oasis Terraces in September 2018.

Opened on 24 November 2017, the Punggol Polyclinic is the 19th polyclinic in Singapore and is the 10th under the SingHealth group. Other than outpatient medical care, the polyclinic also offers X-ray, physiotherapy, podiatry services and women health services such as screening for cervical and breast cancer. The polyclinic is also the first in the country to have an automated pharmacy and is also the first to pilot an after care programme specially for new mothers with gestational diabetes mellitus.

== Gallery ==
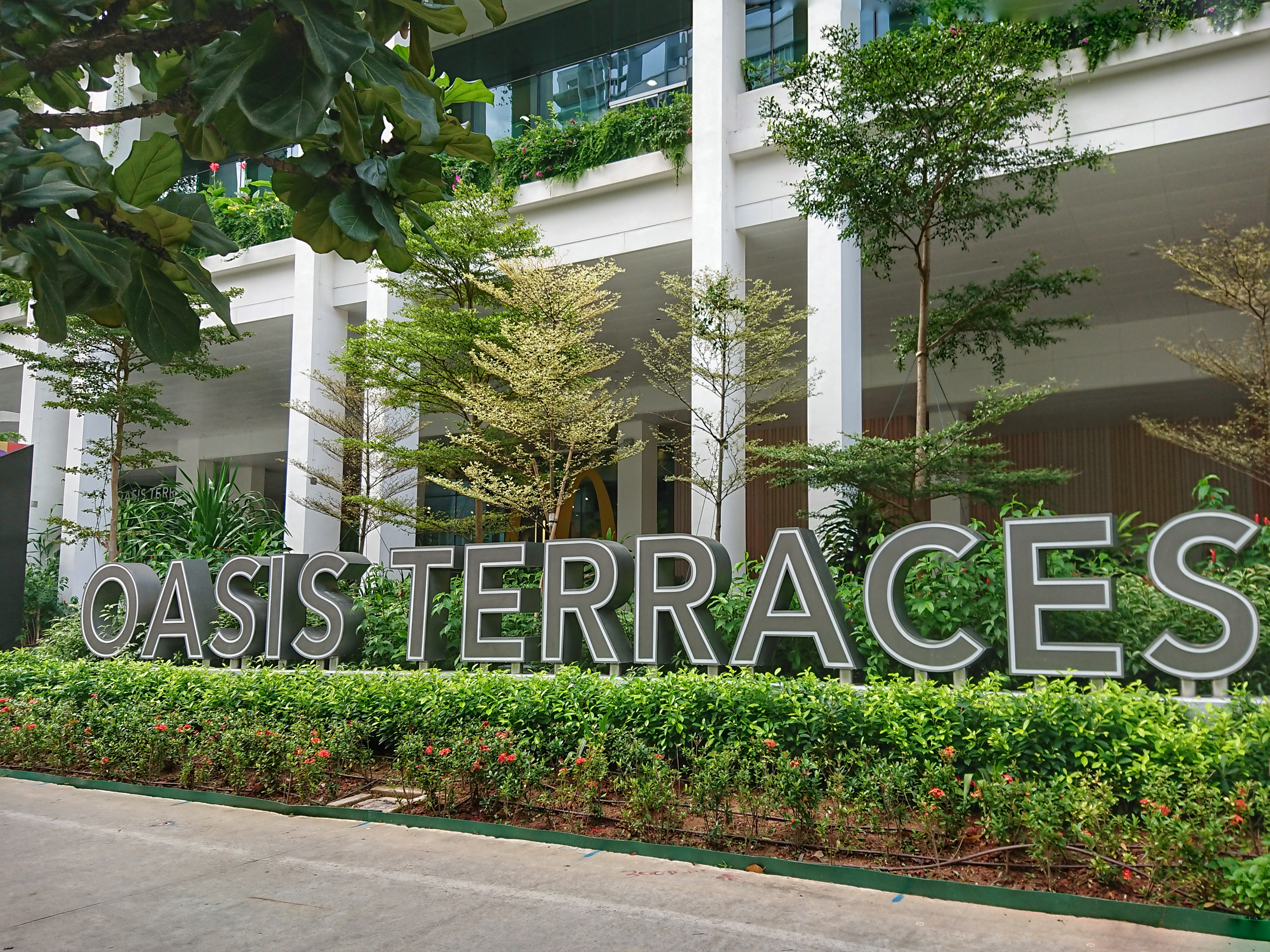
Oasis Terraces front entrance signage in September 2018.

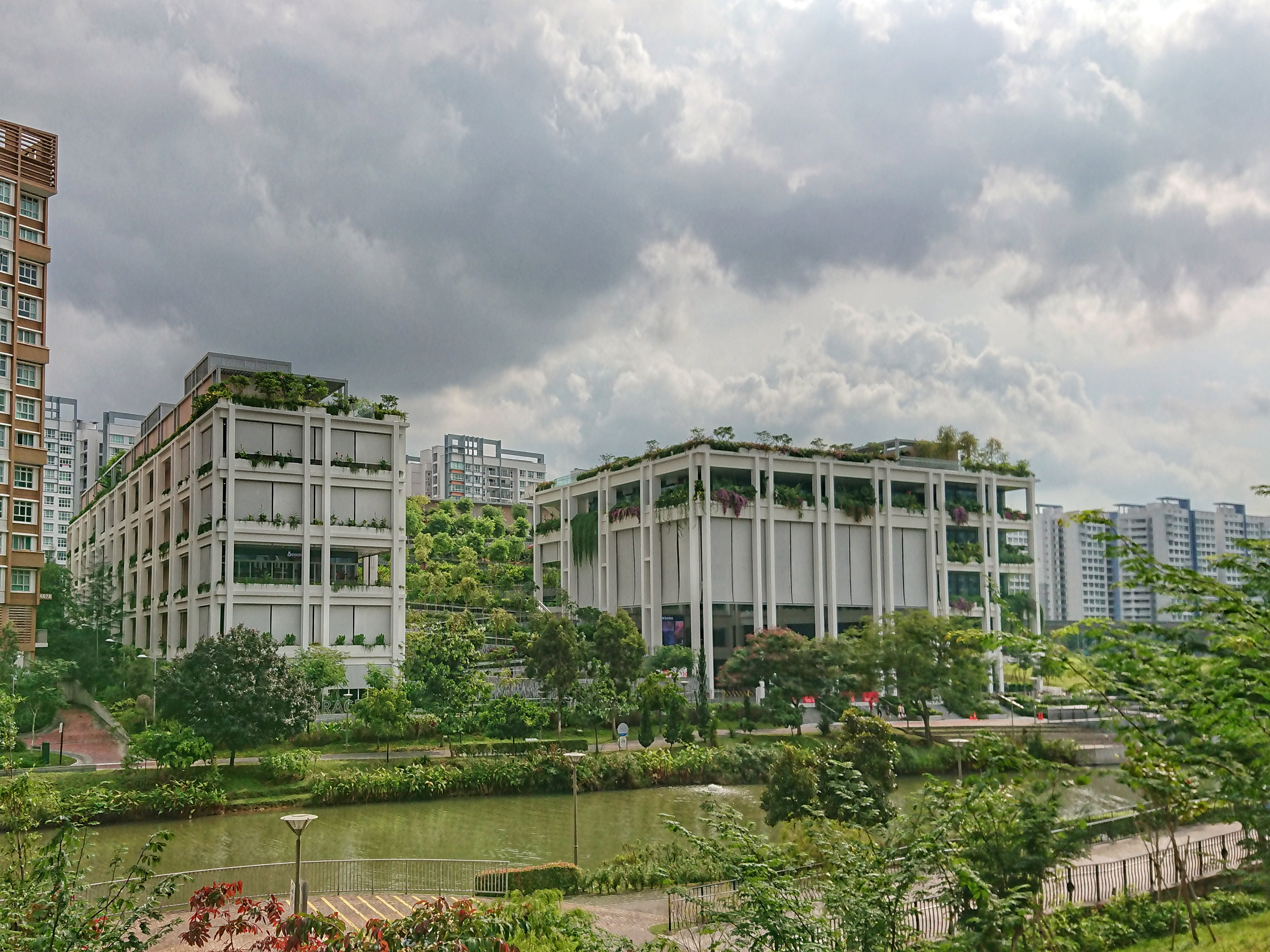
View of Oasis Terraces from the waterway in September 2018.

== See also ==
- Waterway Point
- Punggol Plaza
