= Koufu (disambiguation) =

Koufu may refer to:

- Koufu, a Zhou noble
- Kōfu, Yamanashi, in Japan
- Koufu (company), a Singaporean food court chain
