= Punggol Plaza =

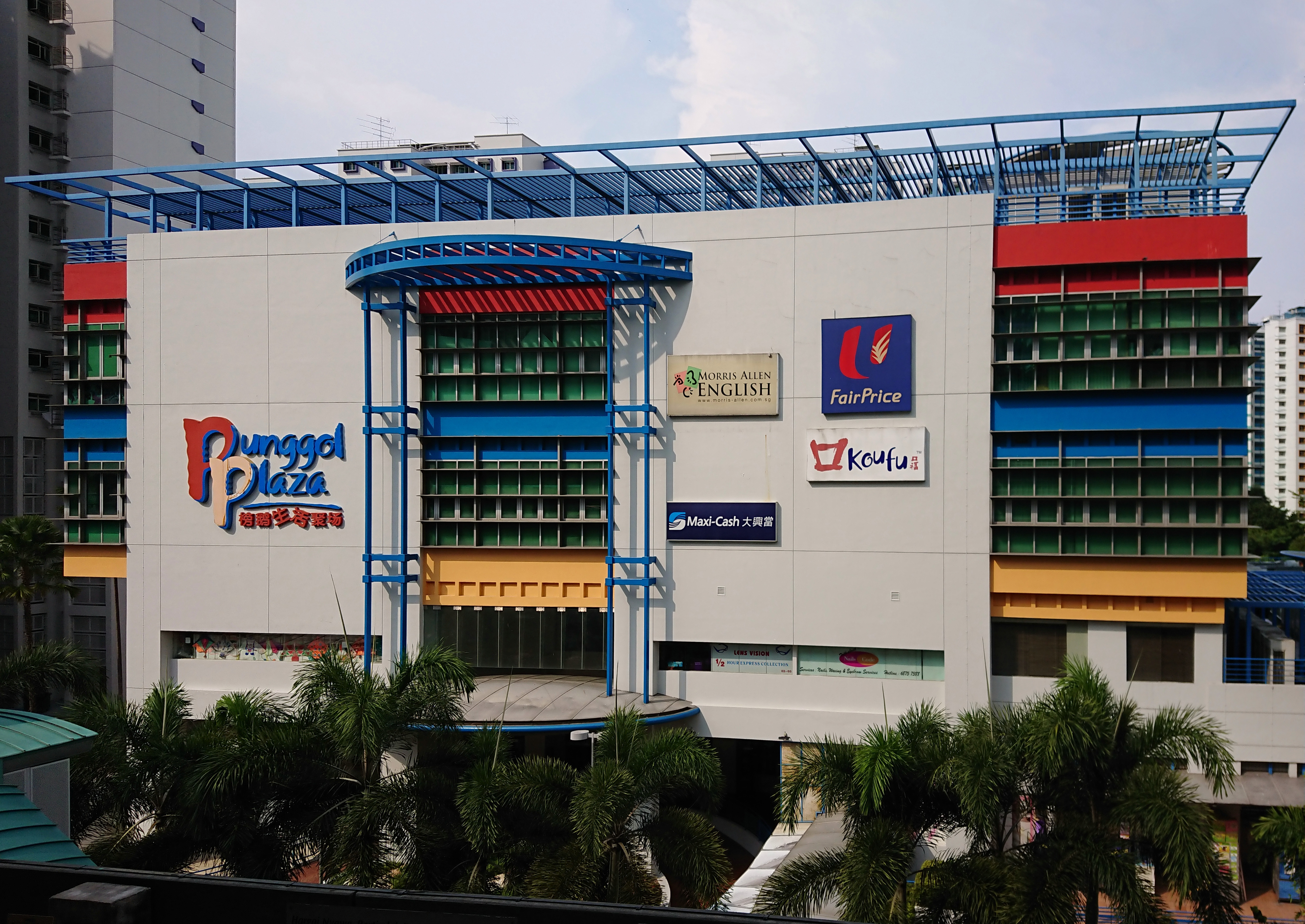
- Main facade of Punggol Plaza in 2018
- Location: Punggol, Singapore
- Address: 168 Punggol Field, Singapore 820168
- Opened: September 2004; 22 years ago
- Developer: Housing and Development Board
- Manager: Abundance Development Pte Ltd
- Owner: Abundance Development Pte Ltd
- Num. of stores: 50
- Num. of anchor tenants: 3
- Floor area: 370,824 square feet (34,450.7 m^{2})
- Floors: 6 (2 basement levels)
- Parking: Yes
- Public transit: PE3 Coral Edge; 3, 62, 83, 381, 386, 569, 591, 593, 666, 729, 744
- Website: Punggol Plaza

Punggol Plaza is a shopping mall located in Punggol, Singapore, near Coral Edge LRT station. The mall is the oldest and one of the first to be built in Punggol to cater to the needs of the residents living there. It was officially opened in September 2004.

== Background ==
Owned and managed by Abundance Development, Punggol Plaza was built to cater to the residents of Punggol, which was a newly built town during the completion of the mall in 2004.

=== Facilities and services ===
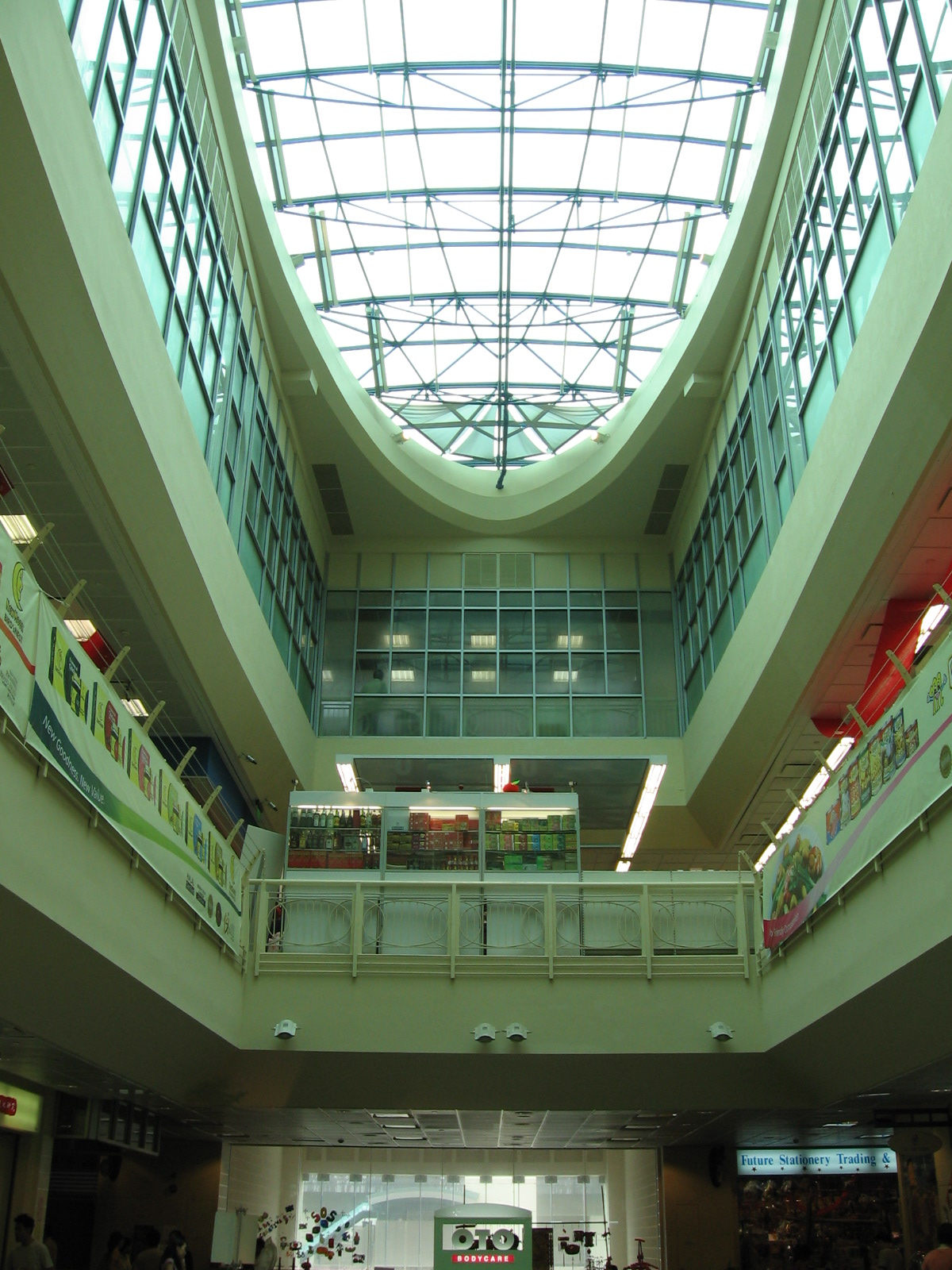
Interior of Punggol Plaza

With a total of 4 floors and two basements, each level provides different services ranging from hair saloons, tuition centres, banks to food. There are currently three anchor tenants in the mall. The three anchor tenants include the Fresh Market, managed by Ai Muay Management, which is located at Basement 1, Koufu which is located on level 1 and NTUC FairPrice, which occupies most of the space on level 3.

The mall also has a 2-storey basement carpark. The carpark at B1 is accessible by both the lifts and escalators in the mall, while shoppers will have to take the lift to get to the B2 carpark. Shalom Car Grooming, a car grooming service, is located at the B2 carpark. There are also clinics offering general practitioner and specialist medical services located on the 1st and 2nd floors of the mall. There are also dental clinics located on levels 1, 2 and 4 of the shopping centre. There is currently one bank serving the mall, POSB Bank. It is located on the third floor. Most of the tuition centres are located on the fourth floor, including music schools such as Cristofori Music. Most of the hair salons are also located on the fourth floor.

== Anchor tenants ==
- NTUC FairPrice
- Punggol Plaza Wet Market
- Koufu Food Court

== Accessibility ==
=== Shuttle bus services ===
Free shuttle bus services have been provided by the mall since its opening in 2004. The free shuttle bus services are between Punggol New Town and Sengkang New Town, making travelling to the mall easier and more convenient.

=== Public transport ===
Coral Edge LRT station is located just in front of the mall, and the mall is also served by bus services 3, 62, 83, 381, 386, 666 (closed and reopened again).

== Gallery ==
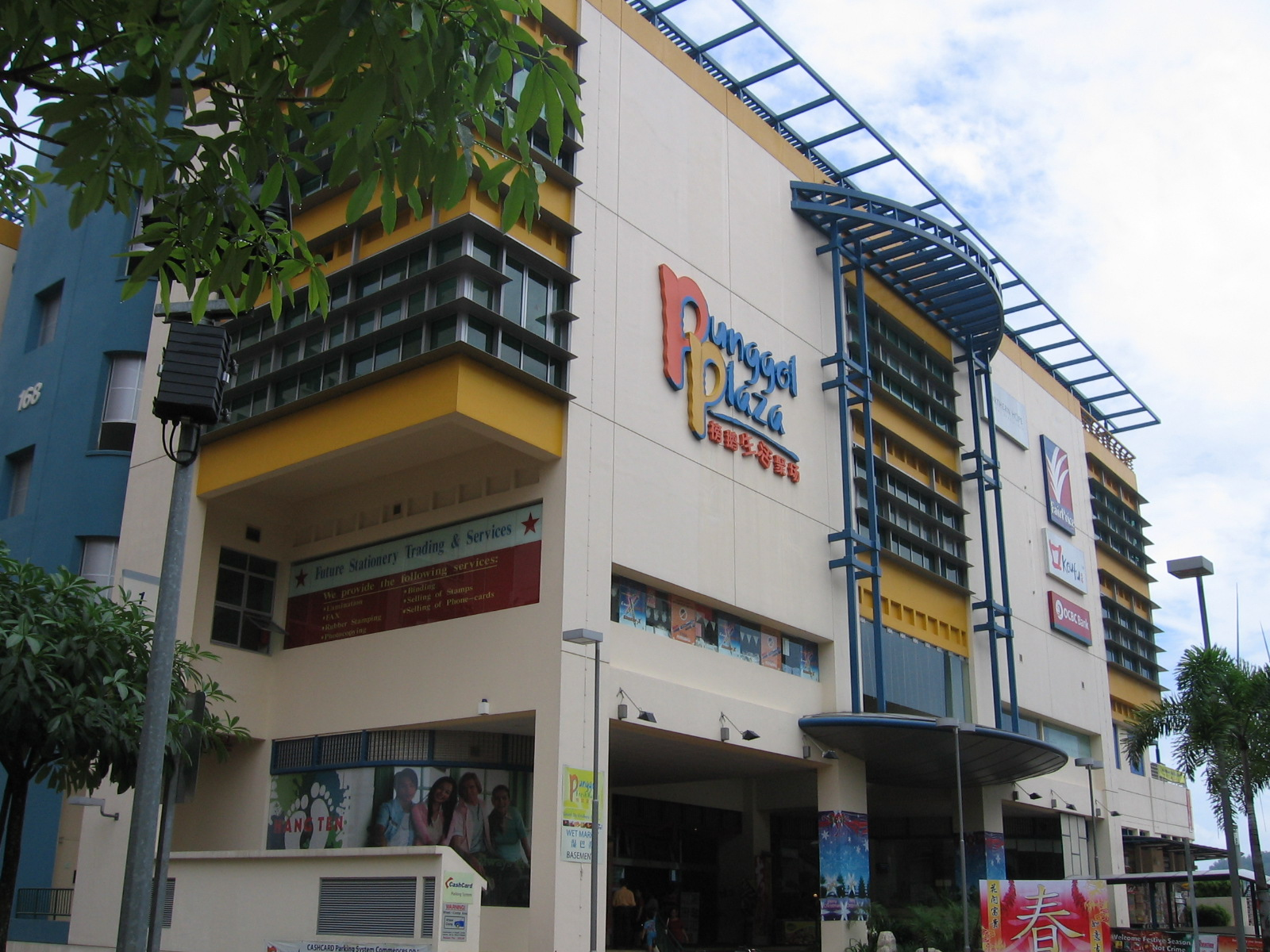
Main facade of Punggol Plaza in 2006

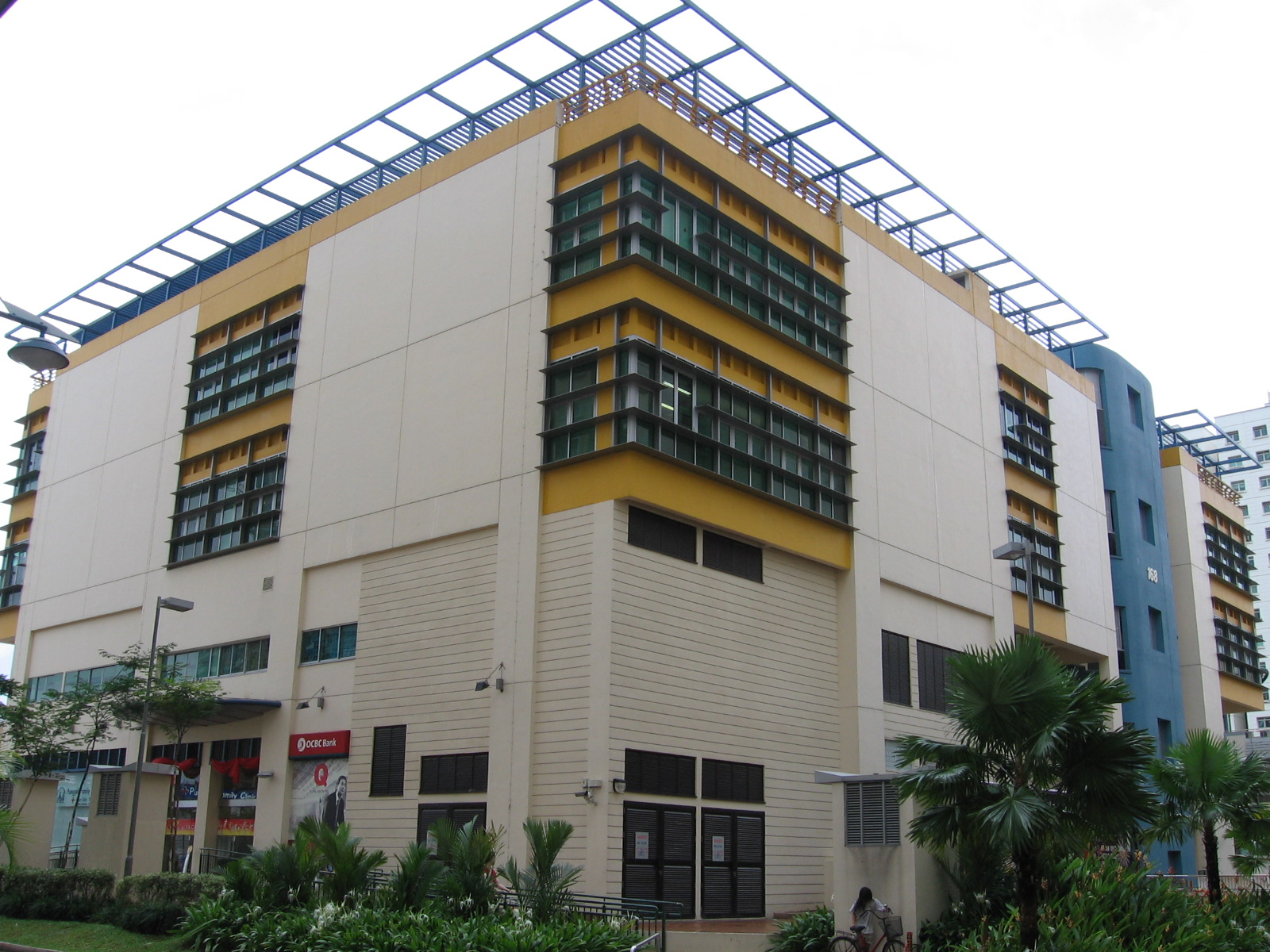
Back facade of Punggol Plaza in 2006

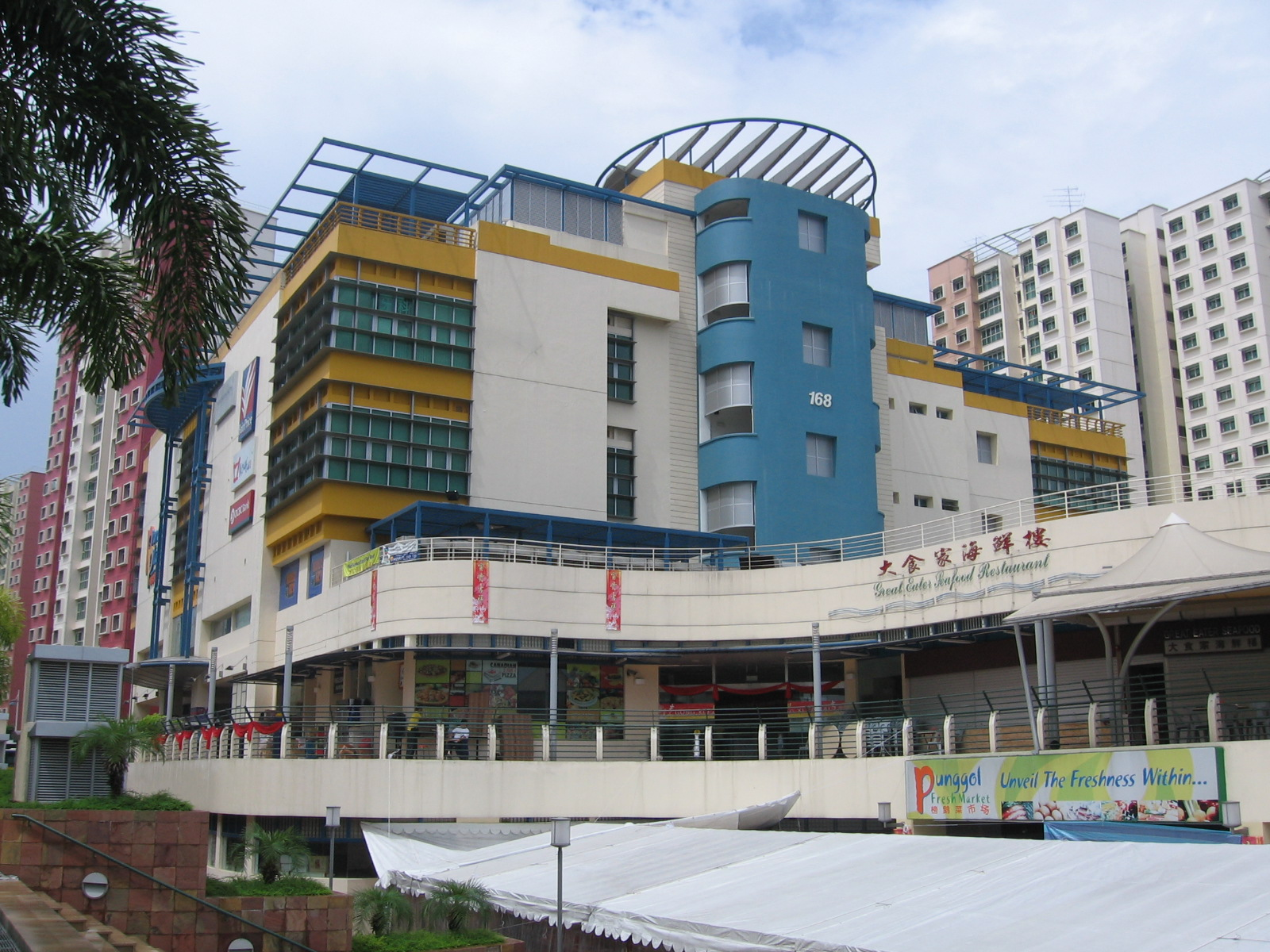
Exterior view of food court and wet market at Punggol Plaza in 2006

== See also ==
- Oasis Terraces
- Waterway Point
- Compass One
