= Punggol Waterway Park =

Park in Singapore

Coordinates: 1°24′52″N 103°54′11″E

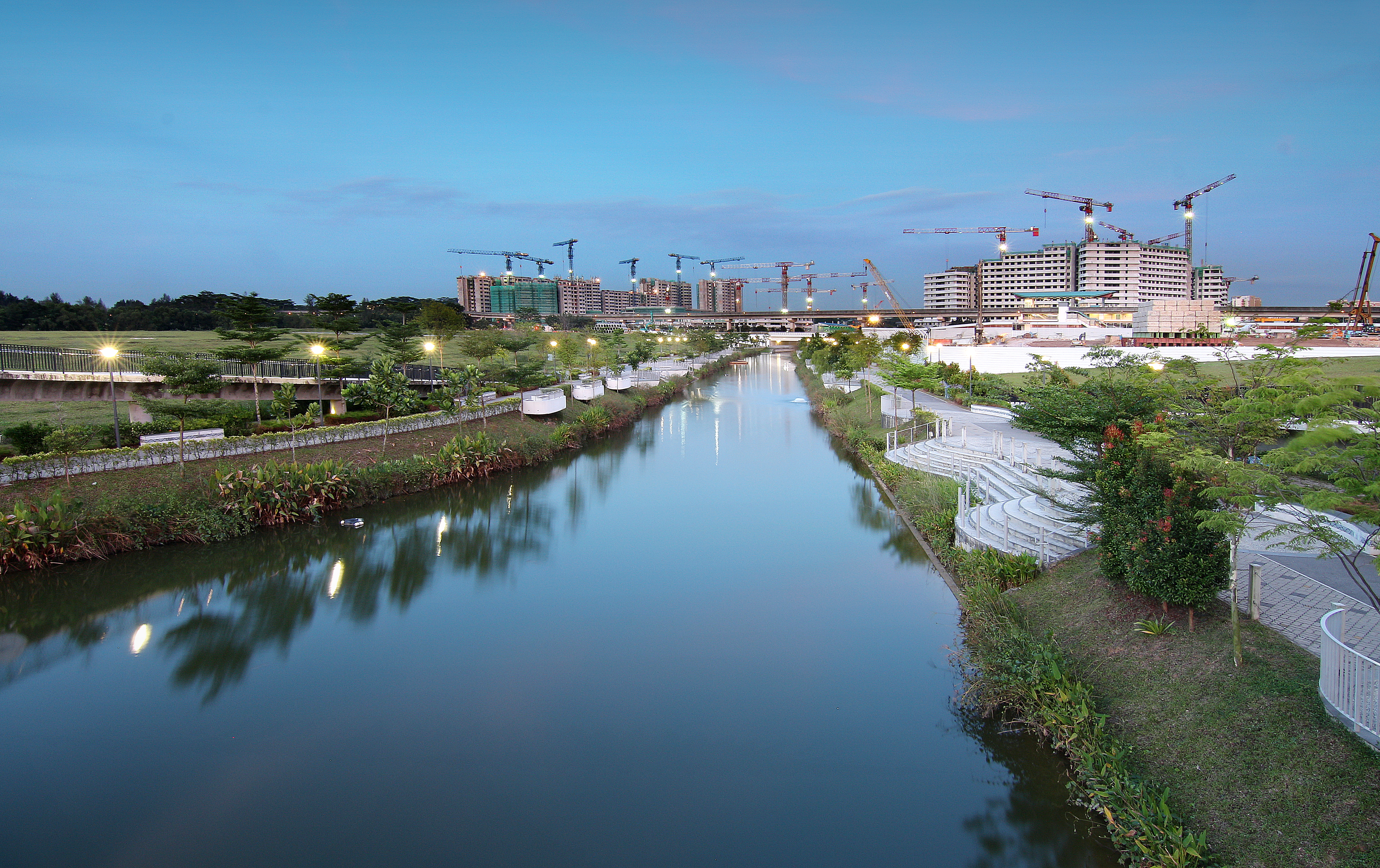
- Punggol Waterway Park in 2013
- Interactive map of Punggol Waterway Park
- Type: Riverine park
- Location: Punggol, Singapore
- Area: 12.25 hectares (122,500 m^{2})
- Opened: 23 October 2011; 15 years ago
- Operator: National Parks Board
- Status: Opened
- Website: Punggol Waterway Park

Punggol Waterway Park is a 12.25 hectares (122,500 m^{2}) riverine park located in Punggol, Singapore, along Sentul Crescent. The park consists of four themed areas. Each area is designated to cater to different users of the park.

== History ==
The park and "My Waterway @ Punggol" are joint agency projects between HDB and National Parks Board. The project is part of HDB's 'Remaking Our Heartland' initiatives to turn Punggol Town into a 'Waterfront Town'. The waterway is Singapore's longest man-made waterway and it runs through the park. It both serves to increase park and water frontage for the housing estates and provide a green respite for residents. Designed with four themes to cater to residents of all ages, the park also provides residents opportunities for leisure activities such as jogging and cycling which can be carried out along the promenade at both sides of the waterway.

== Facilities and activities ==
In 2015, vice activities were previously reported in the area involving foreign male workers and women, with the most recent raid by the Singapore Police Force involving one man drowned in the waters.

=== Facilities ===
There are sand play areas, fitness corners as well as a children's playground in the park. On top of that, there are two venues, the Nature Cove Lawn and Activity Lawn 1, which are available for the public to book events. The Nature Cove Lawn is 5,500 square metres and has a maximum capacity of 3,000 people while the Activity Lawn 1 is 2,700 square metres with a capacity of 1,700 persons.

=== Activities ===
A new 26 km nature loop which links up four parks in Sengkang and Punggol was officially opened on February 25, 2012, connecting Sengkang Riverside Park, Punggol Park, Punggol Waterway Park and Punggol Point Park, allowing visitors to cycle, skate or jog to the next park. The park connector also has a rich biodiversity, with water birds like the grey heron and the white-throated kingfisher present.

== See also ==
- List of parks in Singapore
